= Eiríkr Hákonarson =

Earl of Lade, Governor of Norway and Earl of Northumbria

Erik Hakonsson, also known as Eric of Hlathir or Eric of Norway (Old Norse: Eiríkr Hákonarson; 960s – 1020s), was Earl of Lade, Governor of Norway and Earl of Northumbria. He was the son of Earl Hákon Sigurðarson and brother of the legendary Aud Haakonsdottir of Lade. He participated in the Battle of Hjörungavágr, the Battle of Svolder and the conquest of England by King Cnut.

== Name ==
Eric is referred to in various ways in the medieval sources and by modern scholars. He most commonly witnessed charters as Yric dux ("Duke Eric") but his name is also spelled Yric, Yrric, Iric, Eiric or Eric in 11th-century Latin and Old English sources. In Old Norse sources, using normalized orthography, he is most commonly Eiríkr jarl ("Earl Eric") or Eiríkr jarl Hákonarson, but sometimes as Eirekr. Modern historians usually use a variant of Eiríkr/Eirik/Eric and his patronym, Hákonarson/Hakonarson/Hakonson, meaning "son of Haakon". In modern Norwegian, it would be Eirik Håkonsson. Some English works prefer Eric of Hlathir, referring to his Norse earldom, or Eric of Norway.

== Early life ==
Principal sources on Eric's youth are Fagrskinna and Heimskringla. They relate that Eric was the son of Hákon Sigurðarson and a woman of low birth whom Hákon bedded during a sojourn in Oppland. Hákon cared little for the boy and gave him to a friend of his to raise. On one occasion when Eric was eleven or twelve years old he and his foster father had harboured their ship right next to earl Hákon. Then Hákon's closest friend, Skopti, arrived and asked Eric to move away so that he could harbour next to Hákon as he was used to. When Eric refused, Hákon was infuriated by the boy's pride and sternly ordered him away. Humiliated, Eric had no choice but to obey. In the following winter he avenged the humiliation by chasing down Skopti's ship and killing him. This was Eric's first exploit, as commemorated by his skald Eyjólfr dáðaskáld who mentions the incident in his Bandadrápa. The sagas say that after killing Skopti, Eric sailed south to Denmark where he was received by king Harald Bluetooth. After a winter's stay in Denmark, Harald granted Eric earldom over Romerike and Vingulmark - areas in the south of Norway long under Danish influence. In Heimskringla this information is supported with a somewhat vague verse from Bandadrápa.

== Battle of Hjörungavágr ==
The Battle of Hjörungavágr was Eric's first major confrontation. The battle was fought at sea, between the earls of Lade and a Danish invasion fleet. The battle is described in the Norse kings' sagas—such as Heimskringla—as well as in Jómsvíkinga saga and Saxo Grammaticus' Gesta Danorum. Those late literary accounts are fanciful but historians believe that they contain a kernel of truth. Some contemporary skaldic poetry alludes to the battle, including verses by Þórðr Kolbeinsson and Tindr Hallkelsson.

Hákon Sigurðarson was a strong believer in the Old Norse gods, and when King Harald Bluetooth attempted to force Christianity upon him, Haakon broke his allegiance to Denmark. A Danish invasion force was defeated at the battle of Hjörungavágr in 986. According to Heimskringla, Eric, apparently reconciled with his father, commanded 60 ships in the battle and emerged victorious. After the battle he gave quarter to many of the Jomsvikings, including Vagn Ákason.

== Exile ==
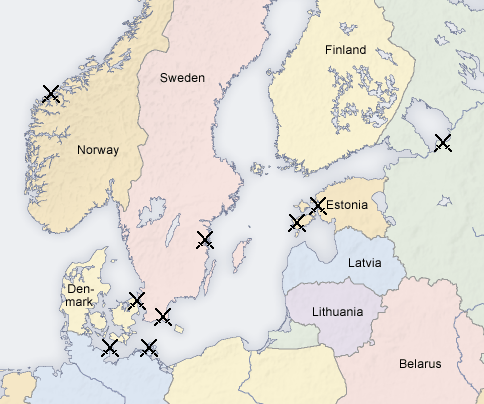
Locations of Eric's battles and raids in Scandinavia and the Baltic. Modern borders shown for reference.

In 995, as Óláfr Tryggvason seized power as King of Norway, Eric was forced into exile in Sweden. He allied himself with King Olof of Sweden and King Sweyn whose daughter, Gytha, he married. Using Sweden as his base he launched a series of raiding expeditions into the east. Harrying the lands of King Vladimir I of Kiev, Eric looted and burned down the town of Staraya Ladoga (Old Norse: Aldeigja). There are no written continental sources to confirm or refute this but in the 1980s, Soviet archaeologists unearthed evidence which showed a burning of Ladoga in the late 10th century. Eric also plundered in western Estonia (Old Norse: Aðalsýsla) and the island of Saaremaa (Old Norse: Eysýsla). According to the Fagrskinna summary of Bandadrápa he fought Vikings in the Baltic and raided Östergötland during the same time.

== Battle of Svolder ==
In the Battle of Svolder in 1000, Eric, Sweyn, and Olof ambushed king Óláfr Tryggvason by the island of Svolder. The place cannot now be identified, as the formation of the Baltic coast has been much modified in the course of subsequent centuries. Svolder was an island probably on the North German coast, near Rügen.

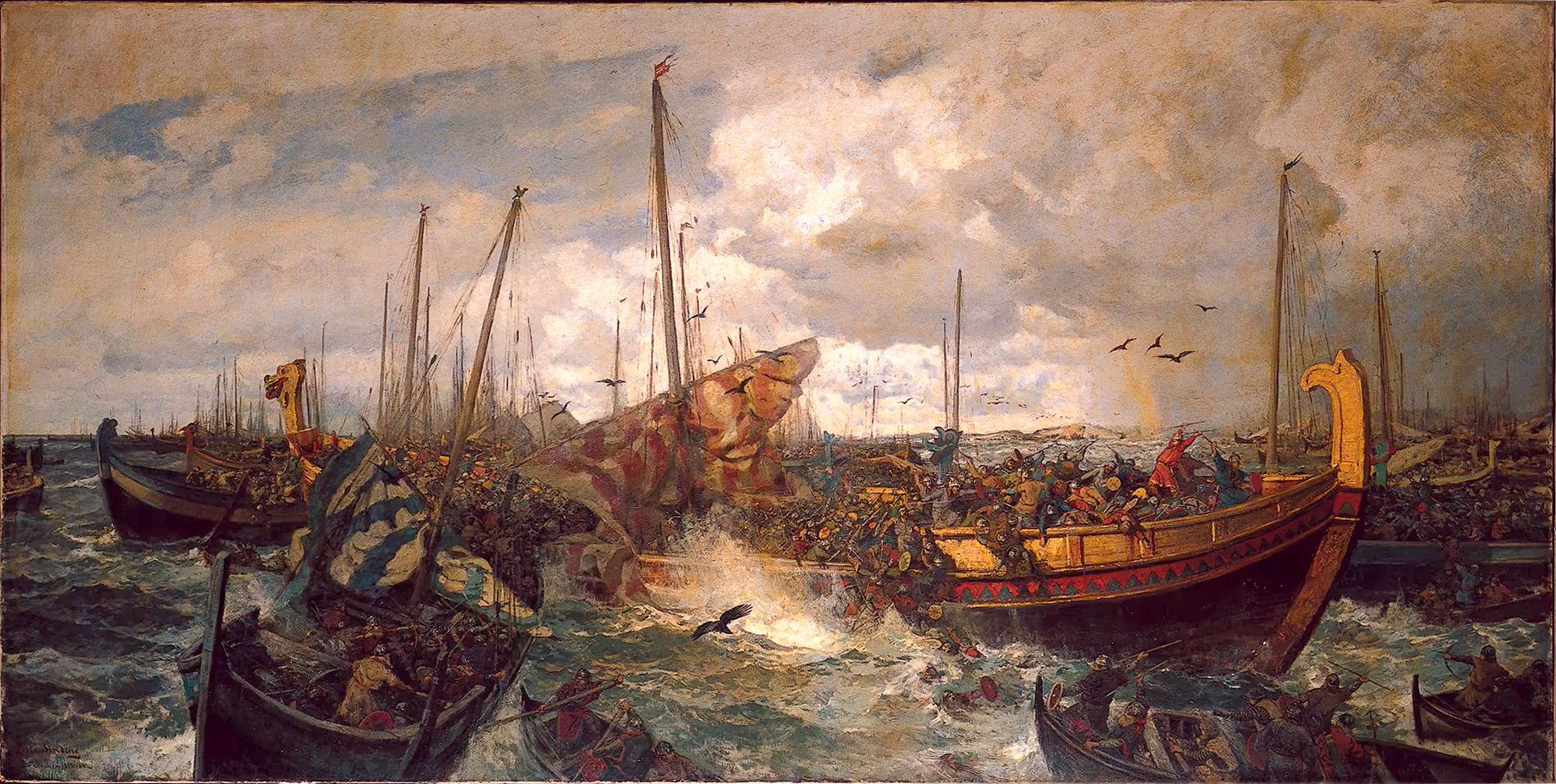
Battle of Svolder by Otto Sinding

During the summer, King Olaf had been in the eastern Baltic. The allies lay in wait for him at the island of Svolder on his way home. The Norwegian king had with him seventy-one vessels, but part of them belonged to an associate, Jarl Sigvaldi, a chief of the Jomsvikings, who was an agent of his enemies, and who deserted him. Olaf's own ships went past the anchorage of Eric and his allies in a long column without order, as no attack was expected. The king was in the rear of the whole of his best vessels. The allies allowed the bulk of the Norwegian ships to pass, and then stood out to attack Olaf.

Olaf refused to flee, and turned to give battle with the eleven ships immediately about him. The disposition adopted was one which is found recurring in many sea-fights of the Middle Ages where a fleet had to fight on the defensive. Olaf lashed his ships side to side, his own, the Long Serpent, the finest war-vessel as yet built in the north, being in the middle of the line, where her bows projected beyond the others. The advantage of this arrangement was that it left all hands free to fight, a barrier could be formed with the oars and yards, and the enemy's chance of making use of his superior numbers to attack on both sides would be, as far as possible, limited — a great point when all fighting was with the sword, or with such feeble missile weapons as bows and javelins. Olaf, in fact, turned his eleven ships into a floating fort.

Norse writers, who are the main authorities, gave all the credit to the Norwegians, and according to them all the intelligence of Olaf's enemies, and most of their valour, were to be found in Eric. They say that the Danes and Swedes rushed at the front of Olaf's line without success. Eric attacked the flank. His vessel, the Iron Ram (ON Járnbarðinn), was "bearded", that is to say, strengthened across the bows by bands of iron, and he forced her between the last but one of Olaf's line. In this way the Norwegian ships were carried one by one, till the Long Serpent alone was left. At last she too was overpowered. Olaf leapt into the sea holding his shield edgeways, so that he sank at once and the weight of his hauberk dragged him down. Eric captured Olaf's ship, the Long Serpent, and steered it from the battle, an event dwelled upon by his court poet Halldórr ókristni.

== Rule of Norway ==
Division of Norway after the Battle of Svolder according to the Heimskringla, showing the areas under the control of Eirik Hákonarson (as a fief from Svein Forkbeard), Sveinn Hákonarson (half-brother of Eirik, as a fief from Olaf the Swede) and Svein Forkbeard

After the battle of Svolder, together with his brother Sveinn Hákonarson, Eric became grand earl of Norway under Sweyn Forkbeard from 1000 to 1012. Eric's son, Hákon Eiríksson, continued in this position until 1015. Eric and Sveinn consolidated their rule by marrying their sister Bergljót to Einarr Þambarskelfir, gaining a valuable advisor and ally. Fagrskinna relates that "there was good peace at this time and very prosperous seasons. The jarls maintained the laws well and were stern in punishing offences."

During his rule of Norway, Eric's only serious rival was Erlingr Skjálgsson. Too powerful and cautious to touch but not powerful enough to seek open confrontation he maintained an uneasy peace and alliance with the earls throughout their rule. According to Grettis saga, Eric forbade duelling by law and exiled berserks shortly before his expedition to England.

== Conquest of England ==
In 1014 or 1015 Eric left Norway and joined Cnut for his campaign in England. Judging from Þórðr Kolbeinsson's Eiríksdrápa their fleets met off the English coast (in 1015) but the chronology of the various sources is difficult to reconcile and some scholars prefer placing their meeting in 1014 in Denmark. At that time Cnut was young and inexperienced but Eric was "an experienced warrior of tested intelligence and fortune" (Fagrskinna) and, in the opinion of Frank Stenton, "the best adviser that could have been found for a young prince setting out on a career of conquest".

The Scandinavian invasion fleet landed at Sandwich in midsummer 1015 where it met little resistance. Cnut's forces moved into Wessex and plundered in Dorset, Wiltshire and Somerset. Alderman Eadric Streona assembled an English force of 40 ships and submitted to Cnut. The Encomium Emmae is the only English source which gives any information on Eric's actions at this time but its account of his supposed independent raids is vague and does not fit well with other sources.

In early 1016, the Scandinavian army moved over the Thames into Mercia, plundering as it went. Prince Edmund attempted to muster an army to resist the invasion but his efforts were not successful and Cnut's forces continued unhindered into Northumbria where Uhtred the Bold, earl of Northumbria, was murdered. The great north English earldom was given by Cnut to Eric after he had won control of the north. After conquering Northumbria, the invading army turned south again towards London. Before they arrived King Ethelred the Unready died (on 23 April) and Edmund Ironside was chosen king.

Following Ethelred's death, the Scandinavian forces besieged London. According to the Encomium Emmae the siege was overseen by Eric and this may well be accurate. The Legendary Saga of St. Olaf indicates that Eric was present at the siege of London and a verse by Þórðr says that Eric fought "west of London" with Ulfcytel Snillingr.

After several battles, Cnut and Edmund reached an agreement to divide the kingdom but Edmund died a few months later. By 1017, Cnut was undisputed king of all England. He divided the kingdom into four parts; Wessex he kept for himself, he gave Northumbria to Eric, East Anglia to Thorkell the Tall, and Mercia to Eadric Streona. Later the same year Cnut had Eadric executed as a traitor. According to the Encomium Emmae, he ordered Eric to "pay this man what we owe him" and he chopped off his head with his axe.

Eric remained as earl of Northumbria until his death. His earlship is primarily notable in that it is never recorded that he ever fought with the Scots or the Britons of Strathclyde, who were usually constantly threatening Northumbria. Eric is not mentioned in English documents after 1023. According to English sources he was exiled by Cnut and returned to Norway. This is very unlikely as there are no Norse records of his supposed return. Eric's successor as earl, Siward, cannot be confirmed as being earl of Northumbria until 1033 so Eric's death can not strictly be placed more precisely than between 1023 and 1033. According to the Norse sources he died of a hemorrhage after having his uvula cut (a procedure in medieval medicine) either just before or just after a pilgrimage to Rome.

== Religion ==
According to Theodoricus monachus, Eric pledged to adopt Christianity if he emerged victorious from the battle of Svolder. Oddr Snorrason's Óláfs saga Tryggvasonar has a more elaborate version of the story where Eric replaces an image of Thor on the prow of his ship with a Christian cross. There is no skaldic poetry to substantiate this but most of the sagas agree that Eric and Sveinn adopted Christianity, at least formally. Fagrskinna says:

"These jarls had had themselves baptised, and remained Christian, but they forced no man to Christianity, but allowed each to do as he wished, and in their day Christianity was greatly harmed, so that throughout Upplönd and in over Þrándheimr almost everything was heathen, though Christianity was maintained along the coast."

Adopting Christianity was no doubt a politically advantageous move for the earls since they were allied with the Christian rulers of Sweden and Denmark. Instituting freedom of religion was also a shrewd political move after Óláfr Tryggvason's violent missionary activity. Eric's religious conviction as a Christian was probably not strong. While the court poets of Eric's rivals, Óláfr Tryggvason and Óláfr Haraldsson, censored heathen kennings from their poetry and praised their lord as a Christian ruler, all surviving court poetry devoted to Eric is entirely traditional. The Bandadrápa, composed sometime after 1000, is explicitly pagan - its refrain says that Eric conquers lands according to the will of the heathen gods. Even the poetry of Þórðr Kolbeinsson, composed no earlier than 1016, has no indication of Christian influence. According to Historia Norwegiae and Ágrip, Eiríkr actively worked to uproot Christianity in Norway but this is not corroborated by other sources.

== Works that mention Eric ==
The most important historical sources on Eric are the 12th and 13th century Kings' Sagas, including the Heimskringla, Fagrskinna, Ágrip, Knýtlinga saga, Historia Norvegiæ, the Legendary Saga of St. Olaf and the works of Oddr Snorrason and Theodoricus monachus. The Anglo-Saxon sources are scant but valuable as they represent contemporary evidence. The most important are the 11th-century Anglo-Saxon Chronicle and the Encomium Emmae but Eric is also mentioned by the 12th-century historians Florence of Worcester, William of Malmesbury and Henry of Huntingdon.

A significant amount of poetry by Eric's skalds is preserved in the Kings' Sagas and represents contemporary evidence. The most important are the Bandadrápa of Eyjólfr dáðaskáld and the works of Halldórr ókristni and Þórðr Kolbeinsson. Other skalds known to have composed on Eric are Hallfreðr vandræðaskáld, Gunnlaugr ormstunga, Hrafn Önundarson, Skúli Þorsteinsson and Þórðr Sjáreksson.

== Sources ==
- Campbell, Alistar (editor and translator) and Simon Keynes (supplementary introduction) (1998). Encomium Emmae Reginae. Cambridge University Press. ISBN 0-521-62655-2
- Christiansen, Eric (2002). The Norsemen in the Viking Age. Blackwell Publishing. ISBN 0-631-21677-4
- Driscoll, M. J. (editor) (1995). Ágrip af Nóregskonungasǫgum. Viking Society for Northern Research. ISBN 0-903521-27-X
- Ekrem, Inger (editor), Lars Boje Mortensen (editor) and Peter Fisher (translator) (2003). Historia Norwegie. Museum Tusculanum Press. ISBN 87-7289-813-5
- Faulkes, Anthony (editor) (1978). Two Icelandic Stories : Hreiðars þáttr : Orms þáttr. Viking Society for Northern Research. ISBN 0-903521-00-8
- Finlay, Alison (editor and translator) (2004). Fagrskinna, a Catalogue of the Kings of Norway. Brill Academic Publishers. ISBN 90-04-13172-8
- Fox, Denton and Hermann Pálsson (translators) (2001). Grettir's Saga. University of Toronto Press. ISBN 0-8020-6165-6
- Henry of Huntingdon (translated by Diana Greenway) (2002). The History of the English People, 1000-1154. ISBN 0-19-284075-4
- Jackson, Tatiana (Татьяна Николаевна Джаксон). Austr í Görðum: древнерусские топонимы в древнескандинавских источниках. Moscow, Yazyki Slavyanskoi Kultury, 2001. ISBN 5-94457-022-9
- Jónsson, Finnur (1924). Den oldnorske og oldislandske litteraturs historie. G. E. C. Gad.
- Keyser, Rudolph and Carl Rikard Unger (eds.) (1849). Olafs saga hins helga. Feilberg & Landmark.
- Oddr Snorrason (translated by Theodore M. Andersson) (2003). The Saga of Olaf Tryggvason. Cornell University Press. ISBN 0-8014-4149-8
- Snorri Sturluson (translated by Lee M. Hollander). (1991). Heimskringla: History of the Kings of Norway. University of Texas Press. ISBN 0-292-73061-6
- Stenton, Frank M. (2001). Anglo-Saxon England. Oxford University Press. ISBN 0-19-280139-2
- Theodoricus monachus (translated and annotated by David and Ian McDougall with an introduction by Peter Foote) (1998). The Ancient History of the Norwegian Kings. Viking Society for Northern Research. ISBN 0-903521-40-7

Eiríkr Hákonarson House of Hlaðir Born: 960s Died: 1020s
Political offices
Preceded by Hákon Sigurðarson	Earl of Hlaðir; 995–1023	Succeeded by Hákon Eiríksson
Preceded by Uhtred the Bold	Earl of York; 1016–1023	Succeeded by Siward
Regnal titles
Preceded by Olaf Tryggvason as King of Norway	Regent of Norway; 1000–1012 with Sveinn Hákonarson	Succeeded by Sveinn Hákonarson & Hákon Eiríksson
