= Battle of Svolder =

Naval battle in 1000 in the Baltic Sea

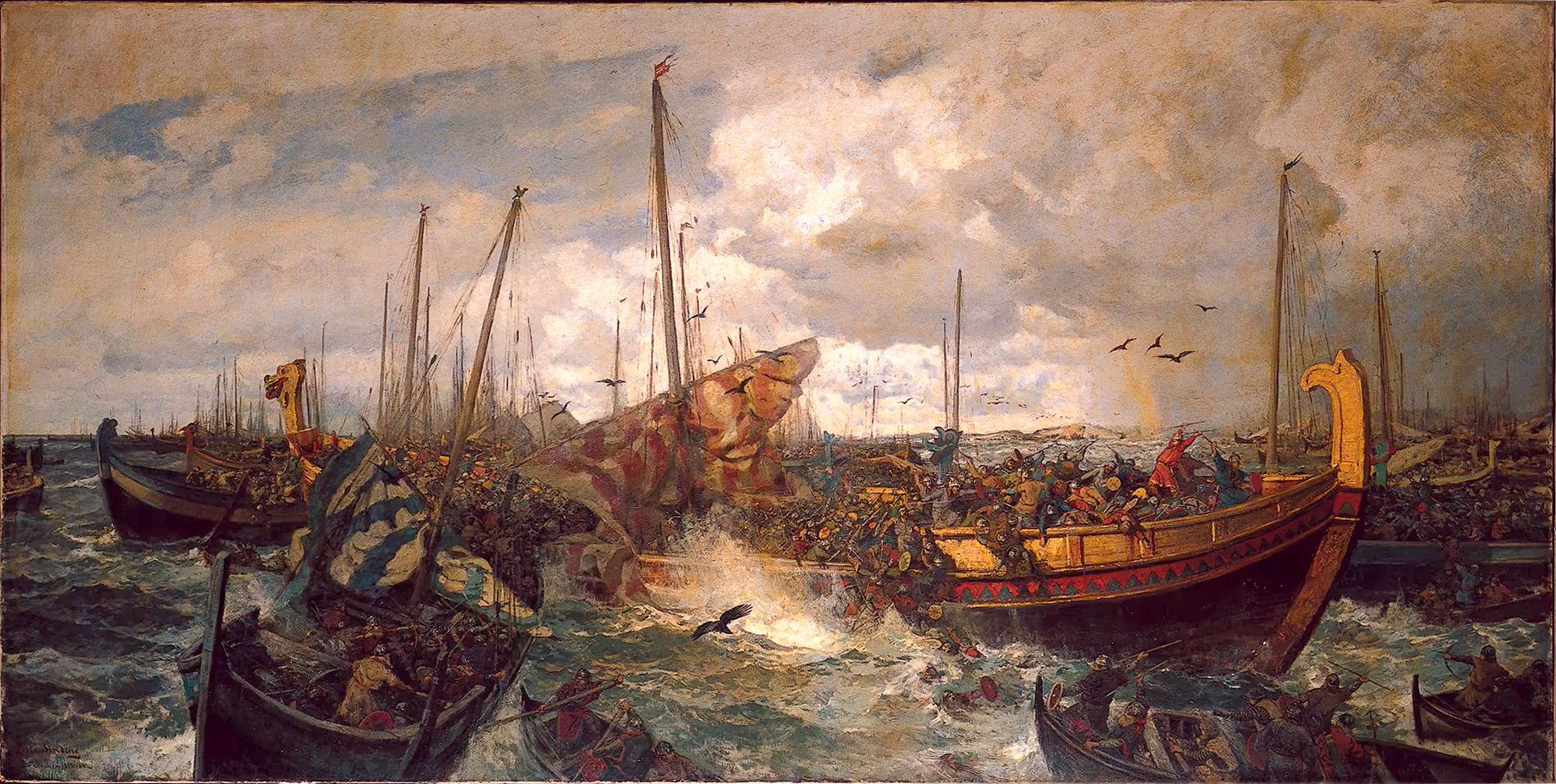
- The Battle of Svolder, by Otto Sinding
Date	9 September 999 or 1000
Location	In Øresund or near Rügen
Result	Allied victory
Territorial changes	Partitioning of Norway between Sweden and Denmark

Belligerents
Norway	Denmark; Sweden; Jarls of Lade

Commanders and leaders
Olaf Tryggvason †; Einar Tambarskjelve	Svein Forkbeard; Olof Skötkonung; Eirik Hákonarson

Strength
11 warships	70+ warships

Casualties and losses
Heavy, all ships captured	Reportedly heavy
- There are no detailed contemporary sources. Information such as the number of ships cannot be regarded as reliable history.

The Battle of Svolder (also referred to as Svold or Swold) was a large naval battle during the Viking age, fought in September 1000 in the western Baltic Sea between King Olaf of Norway and an alliance of the Kings of Denmark and Sweden and Olaf's enemies in Norway. The backdrop of the battle was the unification of Norway into a single independent state after longstanding Danish efforts to control the country, combined with the spread of Christianity in Scandinavia.

King Olaf Tryggvason was sailing to, or home from, an expedition in Wendland (Pomerania), when he was ambushed by an alliance of Svein Forkbeard, King of Denmark, Olof Skötkonung (also known as Olaf Eiríksson or Olaf the Swede), King of Sweden, and Eirik Hákonarson, Jarl of Lade. According to the Saga of King Olaf I Tryggvason, he had 60 warships plus the contribution of 11 warships from the Jomvikings. His ships were captured one by one, last of all the Ormen Lange, which Jarl Eirik captured as Olaf threw himself into the sea. After the battle, Norway was ruled by the Jarls of Lade allied (as a suzerain) to both the Danish Crown and the Commonwealth of Uppsala, Sweden.

The exact location of the battle is disputed, and depends on which group of sources is preferred: Adam of Bremen places it in Øresund, while Icelandic sources place the battle near an island called Svolder, which is otherwise unknown.

The most detailed sources on the battle, the kings' sagas, were written approximately two centuries after it took place. Historically unreliable, they offer an extended literary account describing the battle and the events leading up to it in vivid detail. The sagas ascribe the causes of the battle to Olaf Tryggvason's ill-fated marriage proposal to Sigrid the Haughty and his problematic marriage to Thyri, sister of Svein Forkbeard. As the battle starts Olaf is shown dismissing the Danish and Swedish fleets with ethnic insults and bravado while admitting that Eirik Hákonarson and his men are dangerous because "they are Norwegians like us". The best known episode in the battle is the breaking of Einarr Þambarskelfir's bow, which heralds Olaf's defeat.

In later centuries, the saga descriptions of the battle, especially that in Snorri Sturluson's Heimskringla, have inspired a number of ballads and other works of literature.

== Context ==
In earliest recorded history, Norway was divided into a number of small and sometimes warring petty kingdoms with weak central authority. In traditional historiography the rise of Harald Fairhair in the ninth century started the process of unification of the country and the consolidation of royal power. Harald's descendants, and other claimants to the throne, had to contend with strong regional leaders such as the Jarls of Lade in the north and the rulers of Vingulmark in the east, while the kings of Denmark claimed regions in the south and were eager to acquire Norwegian vassals to increase their influence. The spread of Roman Catholic Christianity had also become an increasingly important political issue in the late tenth century.

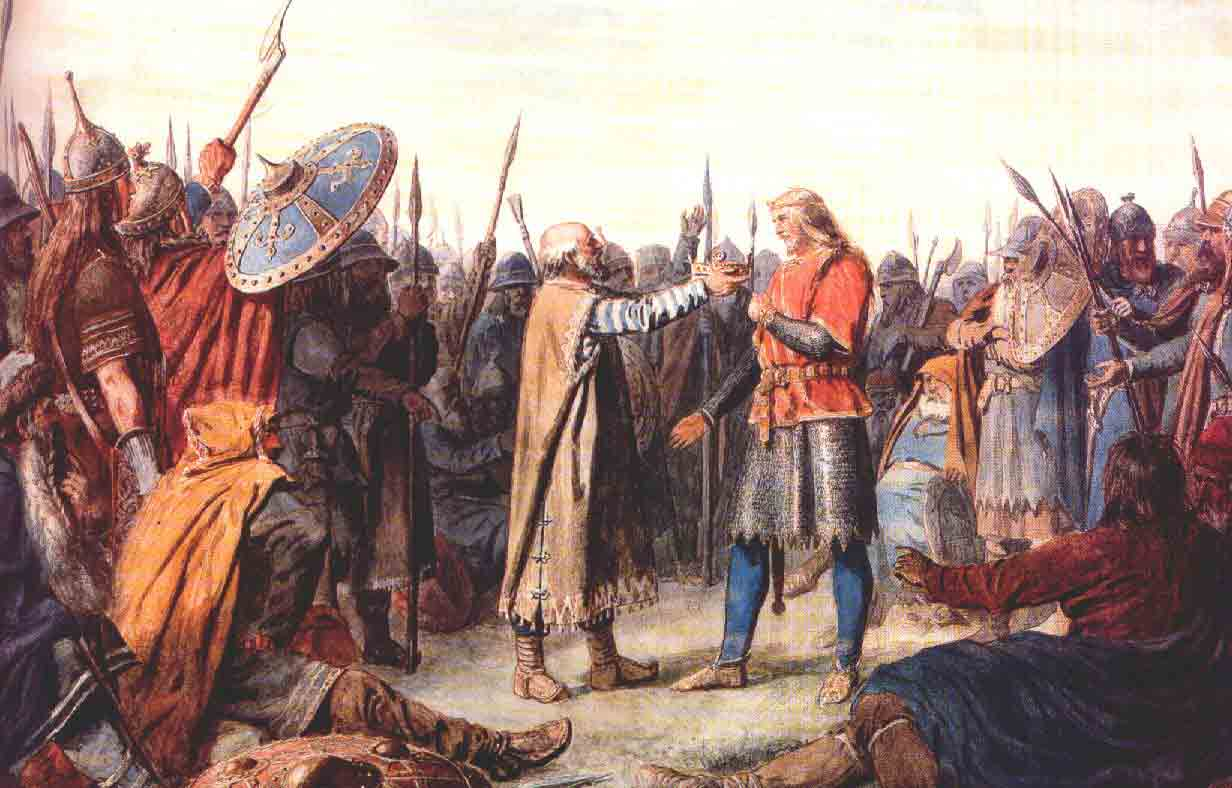
Hailed as king in 995, Olaf Tryggvason quickly proceeded to convert Norway to Christianity, using all means at his disposal

In the 970s, Haakon Sigurdsson, Jarl of Lade, became the most powerful man in Norway, at first supported by Harald Bluetooth of Denmark and paying tribute to him—though the two later fell out over religious matters. Harald had converted to Christianity and was eager to Christianise Norway, while Haakon remained a staunch pagan. In 995 Haakon was deposed and the young Christian leader Olaf Tryggvason came to the throne.

While rejecting Danish authority, Olaf made it his mission to convert Norway and the Norse colonies in the west as quickly and as completely as possible. Proceeding with threats, torture and executions, Olaf broke down pagan resistance and within a few years Norway was, at least nominally, a Christian country. But King Olaf had acquired several enemies during his meteoric rise to power. The most prominent were Eirik Jarl, son of Haakon Jarl, and Svein Forkbeard, king of Denmark, both of whom felt that Olaf had deprived them of their share of Norway.

The same interests which clashed in the Battle of Svolder were to divide Norway for decades to come, leading to further major engagements, including the Battle of Nesjar and the Battle of Stiklestad. The resolution came in 1035 with the accession of the Norwegian Magnus the Good to the throne of an independent and Christian Norway.

== Sources ==
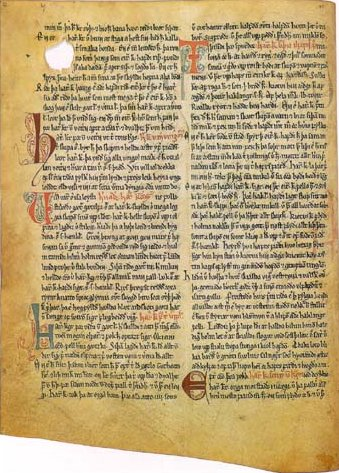
While the battle is described in a number of medieval sources, the narrative in Snorri Sturluson's Heimskringla is the best known and the one which has most influenced modern historical and literary works

The Battle of Svolder is mentioned in a number of historical sources. The earliest written work is by Adam of Bremen (ca. 1080), who wrote from a Danish point of view as his source was King Svein II of Denmark. The later Danish historian Saxo Grammaticus made use of and expanded Adam of Bremen's account in his Gesta Danorum (ca. 1200).

In Norway the three synoptic histories, Historia de Antiquitate Regum Norwagiensium, Historia Norwegie and Ágrip af Nóregskonungasögum (ca. 1190), all give a short account of the battle. The Icelandic kings' sagas offer a much more extensive treatment, starting with Oddr Snorrason's Saga of Olaf Tryggvason (ca. 1190). Working from skaldic poetry, oral history, learned European examples and an uninhibited imagination, Oddr constructed an elaborate account of the battle. This was taken up by the later Icelandic sagas, Fagrskinna and Heimskringla (ca. 1220), both of which add quotations of skaldic verse. Three Icelandic poems from around 1200 also have some historical interest: Nóregs konungatal, Rekstefja and Óláfs drápa Tryggvasonar. The immense Óláfs saga Tryggvasonar en mesta (ca. 1300) combines several of the above sources to form the last, longest and least reliable saga account.

Contemporary skaldic poetry which refers to the battle includes a work by Hallfreðr the Troublesome Poet, who was in Olaf Tryggvason's service. Hallfreðr was not present at the battle but gathered information about it afterwards for a eulogy on Olaf. On Jarl Eirik's side, a number of stanzas are preserved by Halldórr the Unchristian, who speaks of the battle as happening "last year" and dwells on the scene of Eirik capturing the Long Serpent. Some verses on the battle are also preserved in Þórðr Kolbeinsson's elegy on Eirik, probably composed around 1015. Finally, Skúli Þórsteinsson fought with Eirik in the battle and spoke of it in verse in his old age.

While historians value contemporary skaldic poetry highly as the most accurate source available, it must be remembered that the poems are not preserved independently but as quotations in the kings' sagas. After two centuries of oral preservation, there is often doubt that a verse was accurately remembered and correctly attributed. Furthermore, skaldic poetry did not primarily aim at giving information but at artistically rendering facts already known to the hearers. Historians frequently fall back on the less reliable but more detailed accounts of the sagas.

== Events leading up to the battle ==
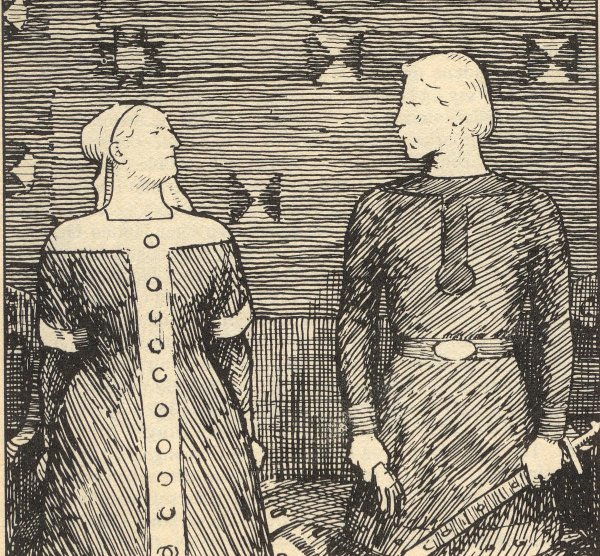
Olaf Tryggvason proposes marriage to Sigrid the Haughty, on condition she convert to Christianity. When Sigrid rejects this, Olaf strikes her with a glove. She warns him that might lead to his death.

Nothing can be gleaned from the contemporary skaldic poems on the causes of the battle. Adam of Bremen states that Olaf Tryggvason's Danish wife, Thyri, egged him on to make war against Denmark. When Olaf heard that Svein Forkbeard and Olaf the Swede had formed an alliance, he was angered and decided the time had come for an attack. Ágrip and Historia Norwegie have a similar account. Thyri was the sister of Svein Forkbeard, and when Olaf Tryggvason married her, Svein refused to pay her promised dowry. Angered, Olaf launched an expedition to attack Denmark, but he was too impatient to wait for a fleet to assemble from all of Norway, and he set sail for the south with only 11 ships, expecting the rest to follow. When that hope was not realized, he set out for Wendland (Pomerania) to seek allies and on the way was ambushed by Svein and his allies. These accounts are contradicted by a contemporary verse of Halldórr the Unchristian which states that Olaf Tryggvason was travelling from the south when he came to the battle.

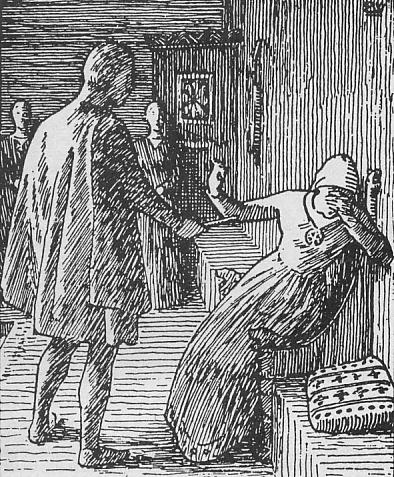
Olaf offers Queen Tyra a stalk of angelica. She weeps and scolds him for not daring to face up to Svein Forkbeard and retrieve her dowry.

Oddr Snorrason has an elaborate account of the problems arising from Thyri's marriages. He tells us that she was betrothed and married to the Wendish king Burislav, who received a large dowry for her; but she did not want to be his wife and starved herself after their wedding, so Burislav sent her back to Denmark. She then arranged to have herself married to Olaf Tryggvason, to the displeasure of her brother Svein. Svein's queen, Sigrid the Haughty, a staunch opponent of Olaf, egged Svein to make war on him. Svein then conspired with Jarl Sigvaldi and King Olaf of Sweden to lure Olaf Tryggvason into a trap. Olaf Tryggvason travelled to Wendland to collect Thyri's dowry from King Burislav and while there heard rumours of a planned ambush; but Sigvaldi arrived to tell him these rumours were false. Believing Sigvaldi, Olaf sent most of his fleet home, as his men were impatient. He therefore had only a small fleet left when he was ambushed near Svolder.

Fagrskinna and Heimskringla largely follow Oddr's account but simplify it and diverge from it in some respects. According to Heimskringla, Sigvaldi sailed from Wendland with Olaf and a fleet of Wendish ships and led him into the ambush.

Whether the above details are accurate or not, it is clear that Svein, Olaf the Swede and Eirik had ample reason to oppose Olaf Tryggvason. Olaf had taken control of Viken in south Norway, an area long under Danish overlordship. Olaf and Svein had been in England together, but Olaf had made peace while Svein kept campaigning. Svein was on friendly terms with Olaf the Swede and connected to him by marriage, so the two were natural allies. Finally, Jarl Eirik had been driven from his patrimony by Olaf Tryggvason, as arguably had his father, Jarl Hakon, whom he may have wished to avenge.

From the conflicting accounts of the sources, historians have tried to reconstruct the most likely sequence of events leading up to the battle. It is probable that Olaf Tryggvason was indeed sailing from Wendland to Norway when he was ambushed, though the kings' sagas probably play up the importance of Thyri and her marriages. While it is possible that Olaf was collecting dowry, it seems more probable that he was expecting war and seeking allies in Wendland, but met with little success. The character of Sigvaldi remains enigmatic, though there is evidence from skaldic poetry that he did indeed betray Olaf.

== Time and location ==
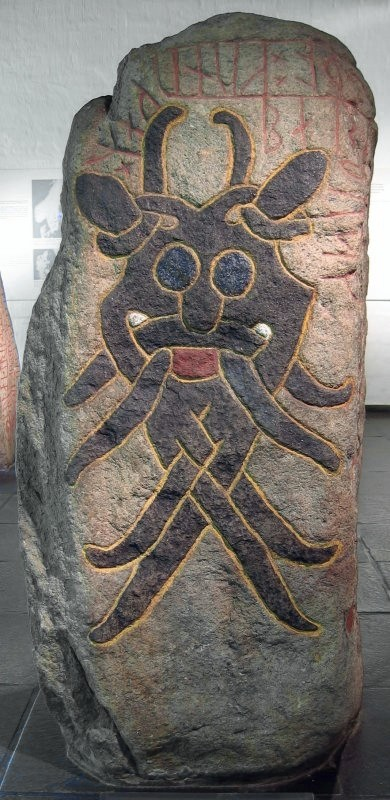
The late Viking Age DR 66 runestone from Aarhus commemorates a man who "met death when kings fought". The event referred to may be the Battle of Svolder

All sources which date the battle agree that it took place in 1000. The oldest source to date it is the meticulous Íslendingabók, written around 1128, which specifies that it took place in the summer. Oddr Snorrason says further that the battle is "memorialized for the fallen men on the Third or Fourth Ides of September", (10 or 11 September). Mesta states that the battle occurred on 9 September, and other sources agree with either date. Since some medieval writers reckoned the end of the year in September, it is possible that the year referred to is in fact the one we know as 999.

The location of the battle cannot be identified with any certainty. According to Adam of Bremen, it took place in Øresund. Ágrip and Historia Norwegie also place it off Zealand. Theodoricus says it took place "beside the island which is called Svǫldr; and it lies near Slavia". Fagrskinna speaks of "an island off the coast of Vinðland... [t]his island is called Svǫlðr." Oddr Snorrason and Heimskringla agree on the island's name but do not specify its location. A stanza by Skúli Þórsteinsson speaks of "the mouth of Svolder", suggesting that Svolder could originally have been the name of a river which Norse unfamiliarity with Wendish geography turned into an island. The Danish Annales Ryenses are unique in placing the battle in the Schlei. Modern historians are divided, some locating the confrontation near the German island of Rügen while others prefer Øresund.

== Composition of the fleets ==
The Norse sources agree that Olaf Tryggvason fought against overwhelming odds in the battle. Fagrskinna, for example, says that he had "only a small force", and that the sea around him was "carpeted with warships" The sources which specify the number of warships all agree that Olaf Tryggvason had 11 vessels but they give various numbers for the allied fleets. Most sources cite the Danish and Swedish forces as equal in size, with the exception of Rekstefja.

Number of ships according to various sources
Source	Olaf Tryggvason	Olaf the Swede	Eirik	Svein	Allied total	Ref.
Oddr Snorrason	11	60	19	60	139	
Ágrip	11	30	22	30	82	
Historia Norwegie	11	30	11	30	71	
Theodoricus monachus	11	-	-	-	70	
Rekstefja	11	15	5	60	80	

Though the sagas agree that Olaf Tryggvason had only 11 ships in the battle, some of them quote a verse by Halldórr the Unchristian saying that Olaf had 71 ships when he sailed from the south. The sagas explain the discrepancy by saying that some of the 71 ships belonged to Jarl Sigvaldi, who deserted Olaf, and that others sailed past the trap at Svolder before it was sprung.

=== Ships by name ===
The sagas describe three of the ships in Olaf Tryggvason's fleet. According to Heimskringla, the Crane was a large swift-sailing warship with thirty rowers' benches, high in stem and stern. It was commissioned by King Olaf and used as his flagship for some time.

Olaf confiscated the second of his great ships from a pagan he had tortured to death for refusing to convert to Christianity. King Olaf "steered it himself, because it was a much larger and finer ship than the Crane. Its stem had a dragon's head on it, and on its stern, a crook shaped like a tail; and both sides of the neck and all the stern were gilded. That ship the king called the Serpent, because when the sail was hoisted it was to look like the wing of a dragon. That was the finest ship in all Norway."

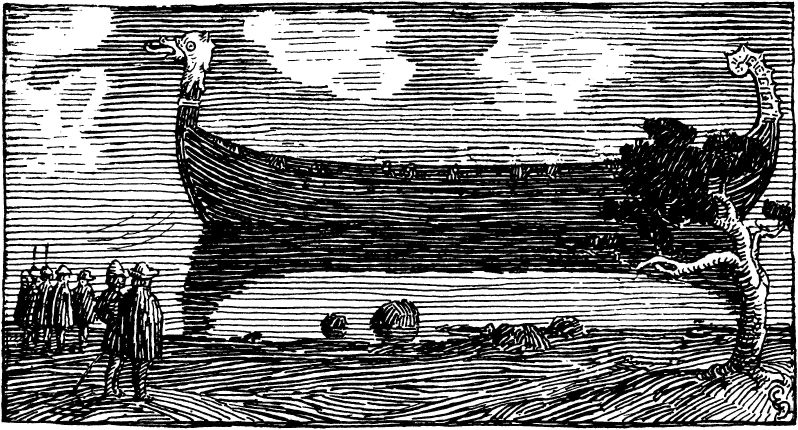
The Long Serpent was "the best ship ever built in Norway, and the most costly"

Olaf's third flagship, the Long Serpent, was a legendary vessel mentioned in several anecdotes in the sagas.

It was constructed as a dragon ship, on the model of the Serpent which the king had taken along from Hálogaland; only it was much larger and more carefully wrought in all respects. He called it the Long Serpent and the other one, the Short Serpent. The Long Serpent had thirty-four compartments. The head and the tail were all gilt. And the gunwales were as high as those on a seagoing ship. This was the best ship ever built in Norway, and the most costly.

The only allied ship described is Jarl Eirik's iron clad Járnbarðinn, Old Norse for "The Iron Barde", barði (definite barðinn) assumed to mean "strakes" or "bow" (cognate with "boards"), alternative the cognate "beard" (possibly referencing the iron plates?), (Note: Less likely, but possible, barði as an inflection of berja, "to fight", if so, maybe indicating veteran status.) although some have translated it as the "Iron Ram". It is described with a low going "iron beam" (Old Norse: járnspǫng), assumed to be a naval ram. According to Fagrskinna it was "the biggest of all ships", but Heimskringla gives more detail:

Original Icelandic text: Eiríkr jarl hafði barða einn geysimikinn, er hann var vanr at hafa í víking;
þar var skegg á ofanverðu barðinu hváru tveggja;
en niðr frá járnspǫng þykk ok svá breið sem barðit ok tók alt í sjá ofan.

Open translation: "Earl Eirik owned a mighty great ship (referred to as a barda) which he was accustomed to take on his viking expeditions;
it had iron plating (referred to as beard) lining the outward strakes in both directions;
beneath it, an iron beam (a ram) protruded, thick and wide as the stem, which took all at sea above."

== Leaders assess their opponents ==
It is unlikely that the saga writers had accurate information on details of the battle beyond the sparse accounts in the surviving poems. Nevertheless, starting with Oddr Snorrason, they present an elaborate literary account, depicting the main participants through their words and deeds.

Olaf Tryggvason's ships pass the anchorage of his allied enemies in a long column without order, as no attack is expected. Conveniently placed to observe the fleet, Jarl Eirik and the two kings remark upon the passing vessels. Svein and Olaf are eager to join battle, but Eirik is portrayed as more cautious and familiar with the Norwegian forces.

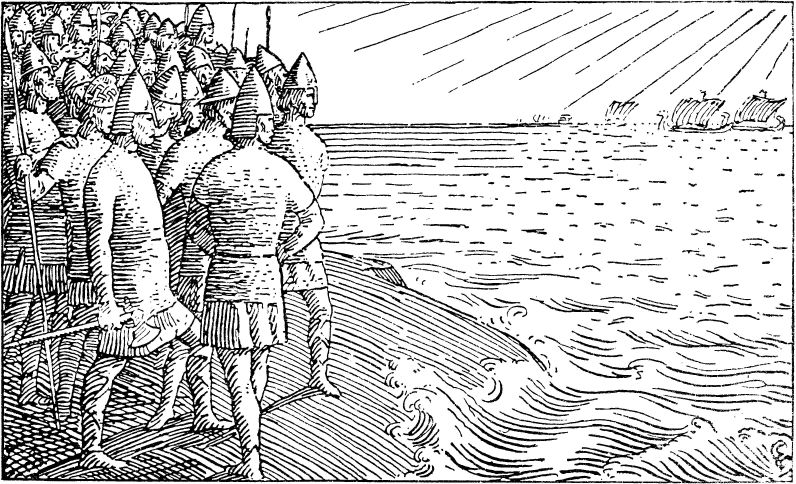
Standing on the isle of Svolder, the allied leaders survey Olaf Tryggvason's passing fleet

As progressively larger vessels appear, the Danes and Swedes think each one is the Long Serpent and want to attack straight away, but Eirik holds them off with informed comments:

It is not King Olaf on this ship. I know this ship because I have seen it often. It is owned by Erlingr Skjálgsson from Jaðarr, and it is better to attack this ship from the stern. It is manned with such fellows that, should we encounter King Olaf Tryggvason, we will quickly learn that it would be better for us to find a gap in his fleet than to do battle with this longship.

As Eirik finally consents to attack, King Svein boasts that he will command the Long Serpent "before the sun sets". Eirik makes a remark "so that few men heard him" saying that "with only the Danish army at his disposal, King Sveinn would never command this ship". As the allies set out to attack Olaf Tryggvason, the point of view shifts to the Norwegian fleet.

After spotting the enemy, Olaf might have used sail and oar to outrun the ambush and escape, but he refuses to flee and turns to give battle with the eleven ships immediately about him. Seeing the Danish fleet arrayed against him, he comments: "The forest goats will not overcome us, for the Danes have the courage of goats. We will not fear that force because the Danes have never carried off the victory if they fought on ships." Similarly, Olaf writes off the Swedes with a reference to their pagan customs:

The Swedes will have an easier and more pleasant time licking out their sacrificial bowls than boarding the Long Serpent in the face of our weapons and succeeding in clearing our ships. I expect that we will not need to fear the horse eaters.

It is only when Olaf Tryggvason sights Eirik Hákonarson's contingent that he realises he is in for a hard battle, because "they are Norwegians like us". The sagas' emphasis of Eirik's contribution stands in marked contrast to the Danish accounts of Adam of Bremen and Saxo Grammaticus, who portray the battle as a Danish victory over Norwegians, with no mention of Jarl Eirik or his men.

== Battle is joined ==
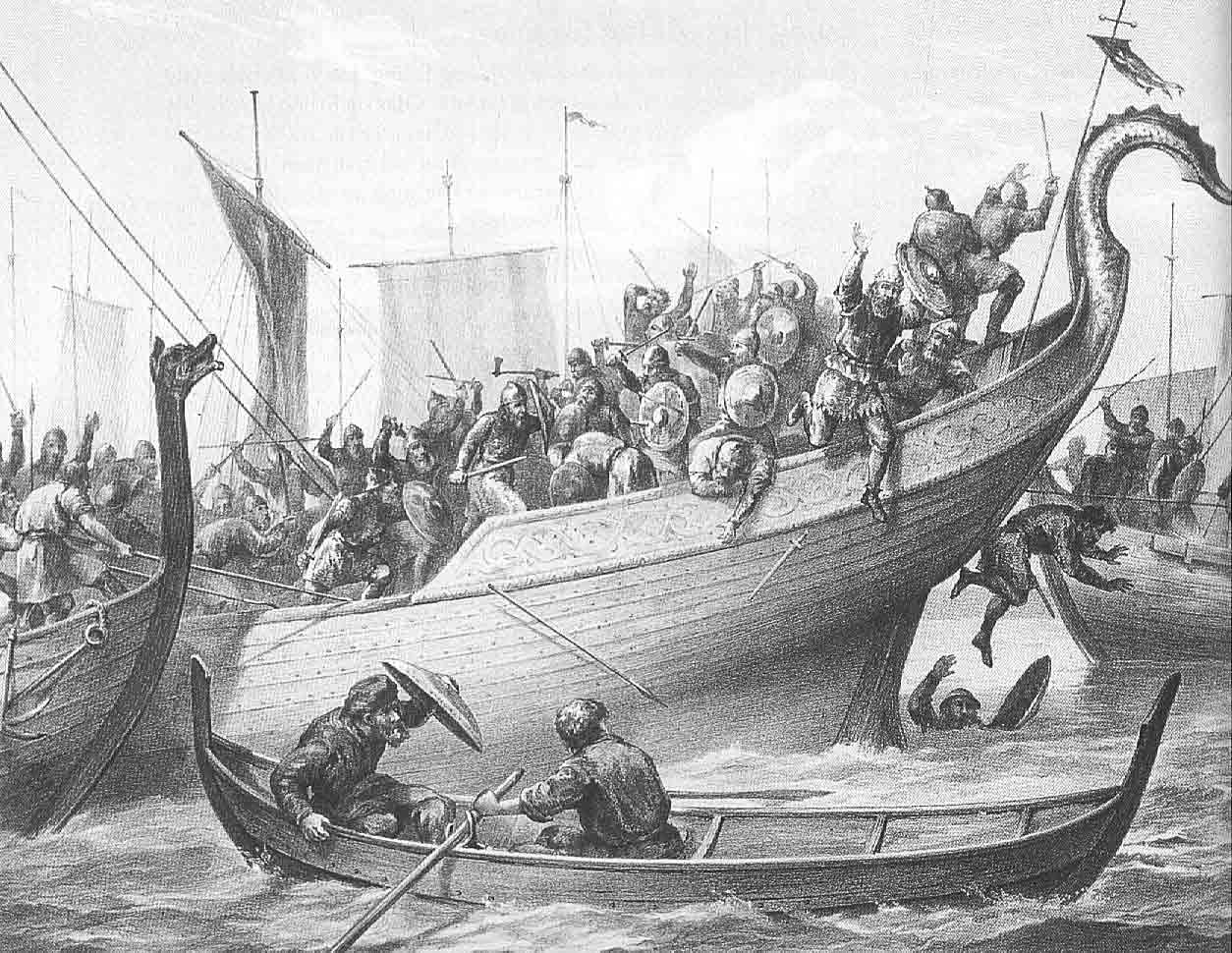
The chaotic nature of a sea battle is shown in Peter Nicolai Arbo's Svolder painting.

The disposition adopted in the battle was one which recurs in many sea-fights of the Middle Ages where a fleet had to fight on the defensive. Olaf lashed his ships side to side, with his own, the Long Serpent, in the middle of the line, where her bows projected beyond the others. The advantages of this arrangement were that it left all hands free to fight, that a barrier could be formed with the oars and yards, and that it limited the enemy's ability to make its superior numbers count. The Long Serpent was the longest ship and so also the tallest—another advantage to the defenders, who could rain down arrows, javelins and other missiles while the enemy would have to shoot upwards. Olaf, in effect, turned his eleven ships into a floating fort.

The sagas give all the credit to the Norwegians, praising Eirik Hákonarson for any intelligence and for most of the valour shown by Olaf Tryggvason's opponents. The Danes and Swedes rush at the front of Olaf's line and are repulsed, suffering heavy casualties and loss of ships. Jarl Eirik attacks the flank and forces his vessel, the Járnbarðinn, up against the last ship of Olaf's line, which he clears with a fierce attack and then proceeds onto the next ship. In this way, Olaf's ships were cleared one by one, till the Long Serpent alone was left.

== Einarr Þambarskelfir ==
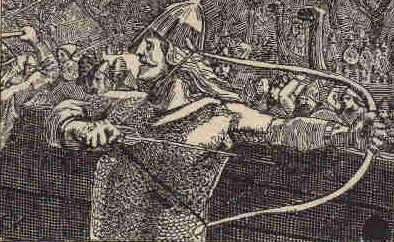
Einarr Þambarskelfir tries the king's bow and finds it too weak.

One of the best known episodes from the battle involves Einarr Þambarskelfir, an archer in King Olaf's fleet who later became a cunning politician. Heimskringla describes his attempt at killing Jarl Eirik and saving the day for Olaf:

Einar shot an arrow at Earl Eirik, which hit the tiller end just above the earl's head so hard that it entered the wood up to the arrow-shaft. The Earl looked that way, and asked if they knew who had shot; and at the same moment another arrow flew between his hand and his side, and into the stuffing of the chief's stool, so that the barb stood far out on the other side. Then said the earl to a man called Fin,—but some say he was of Fin (Laplander) race, and was a superior archer,—"Shoot that tall man by the mast." Fin shot; and the arrow hit the middle of Einar's bow just at the moment that Einar was drawing it, and the bow was split in two parts.

"What is that", cried King Olaf, "that broke with such a noise?"

"Norway, king, from thy hands," cried Einar.

"No! not quite so much as that," says the king; "take my bow, and shoot," flinging the bow to him.

Einarr took the bow, and drew it over the head of the arrow. "Too weak, too weak," said he, "for the bow of a mighty king!" and, throwing the bow aside, he took sword and shield, and fought valiantly.

The same story is found in Gesta Danorum, though there Einarr is aiming at Svein, rather than Eirik.

== Death of King Olaf ==
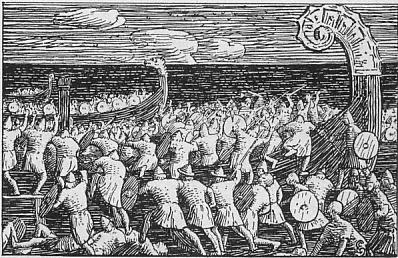
In the final stage of the battle, Eirik and his men board the Long Serpent.

At last, the Long Serpent is overpowered and Olaf Tryggvason defeated. The Danish sources report that when all was lost he committed suicide by throwing himself into the sea, "the end befitting his life", according to Adam of Bremen. Saxo Grammaticus says that Olaf preferred suicide to death at the hands of the enemy and jumped overboard in full armour rather than see his foes victorious. The Norwegian and Icelandic accounts are more complex and more favourable to Olaf. Hallfreðr's memorial poem for his lord had already alluded to rumours that Olaf escaped death at Svolder. The sagas offer a variety of possibilities. Ágrip reports:

"But of the fall of King Óláfr nothing was known. It was seen that as the fighting lessened he stood, still alive, on the high-deck astern on the Long Serpent, which had thirty-two rowing places. But when Eiríkr went to the stern of the ship in search of the king, a light flashed before him as though it were lightning, and when the light disappeared, the king himself was gone."

Other sagas suggest that one way or another Olaf made his way to the shore; perhaps by swimming, perhaps with the help of angels, most likely rescued by one of the Wendish ships present. After his escape, Olaf supposedly sought salvation for his soul abroad, perhaps joining a monastery. Mesta describes a series of "sightings" of him in the Holy Land, the last in the 1040s.

King Olaf, like Charlemagne, Frederick Barbarossa and Sebastian of Portugal, is one of those legendary heroic figures whose return was looked for by the people, their deaths never completely accepted. (See King asleep in mountain.)

== Aftermath ==
Division of Norway after the Battle of Svolder according to the Heimskringla.

After the Battle of Svolder, the victorious leaders split Norway into areas of control. Heimskringla gives the most detailed account of the division, describing it as threefold. Olaf the Swede received four districts in Trondheim as well as Møre, Romsdal and Rånrike. He gave these to Jarl Svein Hákonarson, his son in law, to hold as a vassal. Svein Forkbeard gained possession of the Viken district, where Danish influence had long been strong. The rest of Norway was ruled by Eirik Hákonarson as Svein's vassal. Fagrskinna, in contrast, says that the Swedish part consisted of Oppland and a part of Trondheim. Other sources are less specific.

The Jarls Eirik and Svein proved strong, competent rulers, and their reign was prosperous. Most sources say that they adopted Christianity but allowed the people religious freedom, leading to a backlash against Christianity which undid much of Olaf Tryggvason's missionary work.

== Legacy ==
Several factors combined to make the Battle of Svolder one of the most famous battles of the Viking Age. In Norwegian-Icelandic historiography, King Olaf Tryggvason was held in high regard as the man who brought Christianity to the North. His colourful end in a battle against overwhelming odds therefore makes a fitting narrative. Jarl Eirik's court poets also ensured their lord a fair share of the glory. Mesta says:

The battle is acknowledged to have been for many reasons the most famous that was ever fought in Northern lands. For, first there was the noble defence made by King Olaf and his men on board the Long Serpent. No instance is known where men have defended themselves so long and so valiantly against such overwhelming numbers of foes as they had to encounter. Then there was the fierce attack made by Earl Eric and his men, which has been held in wide renown. ... The battle was very famous too, on account of the great slaughter, and the Earl's success in clearing a ship that up to that time was the largest built and the fairest in Norway; of which shipmen said that it would never, while floating on the sea, be won with arms in the face of such heroes as manned it.

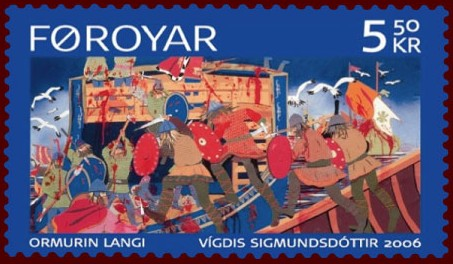
Faroese stamp showing a scene from the Battle of Svolder, inspired by Jens Christian Djurhuus' poem, Ormurin langi

In Iceland, where the kings' sagas continued to be copied and studied, the battle exercised the imagination of several poets. A 15th century rímur cycle, Svǫldrar rímur, chronicles the battle in verse, largely following the account of Oddr Snorrason. Two more rímur cycles on the same topic were composed in the 18th century, one of which is preserved. In the 19th century, the popular poet Sigurður Breiðfjörð composed yet another rímur cycle on the battle, based on the account in Mesta.

With the 19th century rise of nationalism and romanticism and the growing number of translations of the sagas, interest in the battle of Svolder increased outside of Iceland. Around 1830, the Faroese poet Jens Christian Djurhuus composed a ballad on the battle titled Ormurin langi, following Snorri's account. The ballad was well received and remains among the most popular and well-known Faroese ballads. In 2002, a heavy metal version by the band Týr gained some following abroad.

In Norway, Johan Nordahl Brun's rousing patriotic play Einar Tambarskjelve, written in 1772, is considered a milestone in Norwegian literature. Later Bjørnstjerne Bjørnson wrote a well-known short poem, Olav Trygvason, on the fall of the king. Bjørnson also collaborated with Edvard Grieg on an opera about Olaf Tryggvason, but the two fell out before the work was finished. Ragnar Søderlind has now completed the opera, which premiered in September 2000, 1000 years after the Battle of Svolder. Søderlind introduced fate motifs from Wagner, Beethoven and Liszt in the battle scene.

The battle has also inspired art outside of Scandinavia, including a manga volume by the Japanese artist Ryō Azumi. The best known English-language work is probably Henry Wadsworth Longfellow's cycle "The Saga of King Olaf" (from his 1863 collection of poems Tales of a Wayside Inn), much of which is dedicated to the Battle of Svolder, and which includes the verse:

Louder the war-horns growl and snarl,
Sharper the dragons bite and sting!
Eric the son of Hakon Jarl
A death-drink salt as the sea

Pledges to thee,

Olaf the King!

== See also ==
- Christianization of Scandinavia
- Battle of Stiklestad
