= Skúli Þórsteinsson =

Icelandic poet and warrior (11th-century)

Skúli Þórsteinsson was an 11th-century Icelandic poet and warrior. He was the grandson of Egill Skallagrímsson and a courtier of Jarl Eiríkr Hákonarson. A short account of his life is given at the end of Egils saga:

Of Thorstein's sons, Thorgeir was the strongest but Skuli was the greatest. He lived at Borg after his father's day and spent a long time on Viking raids. He was at the stern of Earl Eirik's ship Iron-prow in the battle where King Olaf Tryggvason was killed. Skuli fought seven battles on his Viking raids and was considered to be outstandingly resolute and brave. He went to Iceland afterwards and farmed at Borg, where he lived until his old age, and many people are descended from him.

In Oddr Snorrason's Saga of Olaf Tryggvason Skúli is mentioned as one of the last people to see Olaf Tryggvason, during the Battle of Svolder.

Skúli Þorsteinsson said that when he boarded the king's ship, "the dead men lay so thick underfoot," he said, "that it was hardly possible to go forward." Then he saw the king on the poopdeck, but he looked away and cleared the bodies from under the jarl's feet and his own. When he looked again, he did not see the king.

Skúli also has a small role to play in Gunnlaugs saga where he introduces Gunnlaugr ormstunga to Jarl Eiríkr. Skáldatal lists both of them as court poets of the jarl.

A few fragments of Skúli's poetry have come down to us. The kings' sagas quote a strophe by him where he recalls participating in the Battle of Svolder. Four other fragments which seem to be from the same poem are quoted in the Skáldskaparmál section of Snorri Sturluson's Prose Edda. The poem was composed as Skúli was getting on in years and recalls his warlike youth.

The final fragment quoted in Skáldskaparmál is a lyrical description of a sunset, unique in the skaldic corpus.

Glens beðja veðr gyðju goðblíð í vé, síðan ljós kømr gótt, með geislum, gránserks ofan Mána.	Glenr's god-blithe Bed-Mate wadeth Into the Goddess's mansion With rays; then the good light cometh Of gray-sarked Máni downward.	God-blithe bedfellow of Glen steps to her divine sanctuary with brightness; then descends the good light of grey-clad moon.
