= Eyjólfr dáðaskáld =

11th-century Icelandic poet

Eyjólfr dáðaskáld (poet of deeds) was a skald active in the early 11th century. He was the court poet of Eiríkr Hákonarson for whom he composed the Bandadrápa, his only known poem. Eight stanzas and a refrain are preserved of the Bandadrápa in the kings' sagas, primarily Heimskringla, and in Skáldskaparmál. The content of the poem is also summarized in Fagrskinna. The preserved parts of Bandadrápa relate Eiríkr's early deeds; his killing of Skopti, his becoming a jarl at a young age, his raids in the Baltic and his attack on Ladoga. Judging from the Fagrskinna summary the complete poem was much more extensive, going up to the battle of Svöldr and beyond. It may have been composed around the year 1010.

Apart from what can be surmised from his poetry nothing is known about Eyjólfr. He may have been an Icelander like most known skalds of the period. The refrain of the Bandadrápa celebrates Eiríkr for conquering lands "according to the will of the gods", a phrase borrowed from Einarr skálaglamm's Vellekla. This pagan reference in a poem about the ostensibly Christian Eiríkr may suggest that the poet was himself a pagan.
