= Halldórr ókristni =

Norse poet (c. 1000)

Halldórr ókristni (The Unchristian) was a Norse skald, active around the year 1000. The only thing known about him is that he was one of the court poets of Earl Eiríkr Hákonarson. Eight dróttkvætt verses by him are extant, preserved in the kings' sagas. They contain a lively description of the battle of Svolder. Heimskringla attributes at least some of those stanzas to a flokkr on Earl Eiríkr and scholars sometimes refer to them as Eiríksflokkr. The following is one of the eight verses.

Fjörð kom heldr í harðan,
hnitu reyr saman dreyra,
tungl skórusk þá tingla
tangar, Ormr enn langi,
þás borðmikinn Barða
brynflagðs reginn lagði
(jarl vann hjalms at holmi
hríð) við Fáfnis síðu.

—Eiríksflokkr 3,
Finnur Jónsson's edition

A year since, the Long Serpent
suffered a harsh trial.
Blood-reeds beat each other;
battered were moons of ship's prow,
when the god of the armour-
ogre laid high-sided
Barði—the jarl did battle
by the isle—at side of Fáfnir.

—Finlay's translation

The extant sources do not explain the epithet "ókristni" (unchristian) but it is known that although Earl Eiríkr adopted Christianity, at least nominally, he was tolerant of paganism and his court poets praised him in traditional pagan terms.
