= Valgarðr á Velli =

11th-century skald

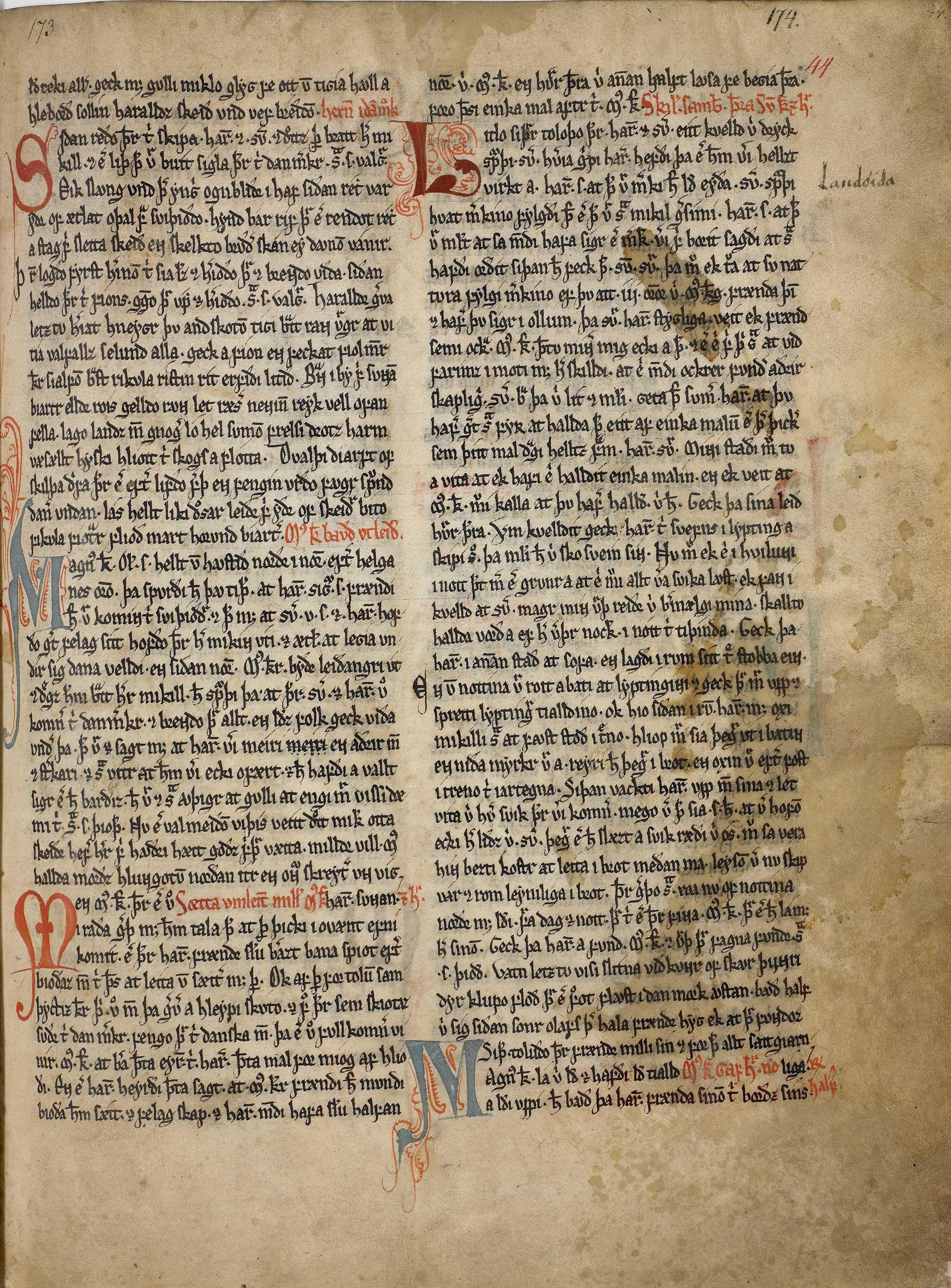
A page from Codex Frisianus, citing stanzas by Valgarðr á Velli on Harald Hardrada's campaign in Denmark

Valgarðr á Velli was an 11th-century skald in the service of King Harald Hardrada of Norway. Little is known about his life or origin but his name suggests he may have been a kinsman, perhaps a son, of Mörðr Valgarðsson of Völlr, a chieftain who plays a role in Njáls saga. He is listed in Skáldatal among the court poets of Harald Hardrada.

== Extant poetry ==
The Norse sources attribute 11 stanzas or half-stanzas of dróttkvætt poetry to Valgarðr. There are three in Skáldskaparmál where they are used to illustrate the use of certain heiti (poetic synonyms). Of these, one mentions that Sicily was laid waste. Two others are descriptions of destruction by fire in an unknown context.

There are 8 stanzas or half-stanzas preserved in the kings' sagas where they are used as sources of historical information on events in the life of Harald Hardrada. The first chronologically is preserved only in Fagrskinna and relates to events in 1042 as Harald joined an uprising against emperor Michael V Kalaphates and had some of his Varangian bodyguards killed. The next is preserved in Fagrskinna, Morkinskinna, Heimskringla and Hulda-Hrokkinskinna and describes Harald travelling from Garðar (Russia) to Sigtuna in Sweden. Another stanza, preserved in the same sources as well as in Flateyjarbók, describes a voyage from Sweden to Denmark which the sagas state that Harald undertook to meet his nephew, King Magnus the Good.

Three complete stanzas describe Harald's harrying of Denmark ca. 1044–1045. The skald praises Harald for crushing his enemies: "Haraldr, you thoroughly ravaged all Sjælland". As the king burns down a settlement south of Roskilde, the surviving inhabitants take flight: "families slipped, grief-stricken, silent in flight to the forest". The description then moves on to the capture of women by Harald's victorious forces:

Dvalði daprt of skilða
(drifu, þeirs eptir lifðu)
ferð, en fengin urðu
fǫgr sprund (Danir undan).
Láss helt líki drósar;
leið fyr yðr til skeiða
(bitu fíkula fjǫtrar)
fljóð mart (hǫrund bjartir).

—Valgarðr á Velli

The pitifully scattered crowd was delayed;
the Danes who were still alive fled away,
but fair women were captured.

A lock secured the girl's body;
many a maiden went before you to the warships;
bright fetters bit greedily into the flesh.

—Translation by Kari Ellen Gade

Finally, there are two stanzas describing a sea voyage and Harald's rule over all of Norway.

== Evaluation ==
Finnur Jónsson described the surviving fragments of Valgarðr's works as testifying highly to his abilities as a poet, showing mastery over language and form and an appealing sense of fantasy. He noted that instead of dry reports on battle and bloodshed, Valgarðr focused in on single moments that were worth paying attention to. Finnur regarded the description of the captured women as a particularly successful example of his vivid style.

== Works cited ==
- Finlay, Alison (2004). Fagrskinna. A Catalogue of the Kings of Norway. A Translation with Introduction and Notes. Leiden: Brill.
- Finnur Jónsson (1894). Den oldnorske og oldislandske litteraturs historie. Copenhagen: G. E. C. Gad.
- Gade, Kari Ellen (2009). Skaldic Poetry of the Scandinavian Middle Ages. Poetry from the Kings' Sagas 2. Turnhout: Brepols.
