= Vellekla =

Vellekla (Old Norse for "shortage of gold") is a partially preserved drápa (series of stanzas with refrain) composed in the late 10th century by the Icelandic skald Einar Helgason skálaglamm. It is one of the two drápas he made for Hákon jarl. It speaks of the Battle of Hjörungavágr and Hákon's campaign in Denmark, among other things.

== Structure and preservation ==
Vellekla is not preserved as a complete poem in any manuscript but individual verses and sequences of verses are preserved as quotations in several prose works. Various verses attributed to Einarr Skálaglamm but not ascribed to a particular poem have also been taken by scholars to be a part of Vellekla.

As reconstructed by Finnur Jónsson, most of the central narrative content of the poem is preserved in the kings' sagas; Fagrskinna, Heimskringla, Óláfs saga Tryggvasonar en mesta and Flateyjarbók. Finnur believed that verses preserved in Skáldskaparmál, where Hákon is directly addressed, belong to the beginning and end of the poem. Two lines are also preserved in the Third Grammatical Treatise. In Finnur's reconstruction, the total number of verses is 37, of which 16 are half-verses and 21 are complete verses.

== Editions ==
- Finnur Jónsson (ed.). Den norsk-islandske skjaldedigtning. Vols 1A-2A (tekst efter håndskrifterne) and 1B-2B (rettet tekst). Copenhagen and Christiania [Oslo]: Gyldendal, 1912–15; rpt. Copenhagen: Rosenkilde & Bagger, 1967 (A) and 1973 (B), vol. 1A, pp. 122–31, 1B, pp. 117–24.
- Lindquist, Ivar (ed.) (1929). Norröna lovkväden från 800- och 900-talen. 1. Förslag till restituerad täxt jämte översättning, pp. 44–55. Lund: Gleeruppp.
- Kock, Ernst A. (ed.) (1946–50). Den norsk-isländska skaldediktningen, vol. 1, pp. 66–9. Lund: Gleerup.

== Translations ==
- Freudenthal, Axel Olof (1865). Einar Skålaglams Vellekla, öfversatt och förklarad. Frenckell.
- Hollander, Lee M. (trans.) (1945). The Skalds: A Selection of Their Poems. New York: American-Scandinavian Foundation; Princeton: Princeton University Press.
