= Hrómundur Þórisson =

Viking explorer

Hrómundur Þórisson (Thorisson, b. about 824) was a Viking explorer and one of the first settlers of Borgarfjörður. He was the son of Þórir Gunnlaugsson (b. 796), and along with his brother Grímur háleyski Þórisson, they grew up as adoptive siblings of Ingimundur Þorsteinsson. His son Gunnlaugur Hrómundsson would be the grandfather of the skald Gunnlaugr Ormstunga.

Hrómundur is mentioned in the Saga of Grettir, Saga of Egil Skallagrímsson, Eyrbyggja Saga, and Saga of Hænsna-Þóris.
