= Ormen Lange =

Ormen Lange may refer to:

- Ormen Lange (gas field), natural gas field on the Norwegian continental shelf
- Ormen Lange (longship), one of the most famous of the Viking longships
