= Ormurin Langi =

Folk ballad from the Faroe Islands

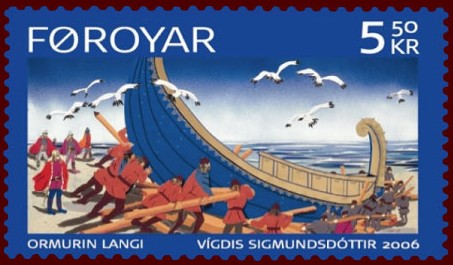
The launching of the ship, from a Faroese stamp commemorating the ballad

Ormurin Langi ("The Long Serpent") is a Faroese folk ballad. It was written in ca. 1830 by Jens Christian Djurhuus.

Written in 86 verses in Faroese, the song deals with the Norwegian king Olaf Tryggvason. The title Ormurin Langi refers to Olaf Tryggvason's ship with the same name (Ormrinn Langi in Old Norse).

== History ==
Around 1800, increasing attention was paid to the store of Faroese folk ballads (kvæði), which survived in the oral tradition and were sung as an accompaniment to Faroese dancing. Even before 1800, Jens Christian Svabo had recorded ballads, but serious effort to collect them got under way after 1800, by names like Johan Henrik Schrøter, Jóannes í Króki and later on, V. U. Hammershaimb.

The old ballads were seen as having special historical value, but there was also interest in more recent ballads, e.g. comic ballads (táttur), and new ballads were composed in the old style. One poet who attracts particular notice is Jens Christian Djurhuus (1773–1853), who was a farmer in Kollafjørður. The most famous of his works is Ormurin Langi, "The Ballad of the Long Serpent". His most individual work, however, is perhaps Púkaljómur (‘The Devils Ballad’), a religious epic based on a Danish translation of ‘Paradise Lost’ by the 17th-century English poet John Milton.

Otherwise he mainly takes the subject matter for his ballads from the Norse sagas, e.g. ‘Heimskringla’ (‘The Chronicle of the Kings of Norway’) and ‘Færeyinga saga’, the story of how the Faroes were converted to Christianity under Sigmundur Brestisson and with the resistance of Tróndur í Gøtu. This was the Romantic Age, and Norse literature was very much in vogue. Everything indicates that the Faroese immediately took his poetry to their hearts. In an account of a journey written in 1847-48 the ballad collector and clergyman V. U. Hammershaimb writes:

"The old farmer Jens Christian Djurhuus of Kollafjørður has composed many ballads based on the sagas. They have been very successful and are sung everywhere with pleasure, since their language is pure and they are very much in keeping with the old style; his ballad about Olaf Tryggvason or the battle at Svolder, the ballads about Sigmund and Leif, and his version of Milton's Paradise Lost with its unusual metrical structure are particularly worthy of note."

== Description ==
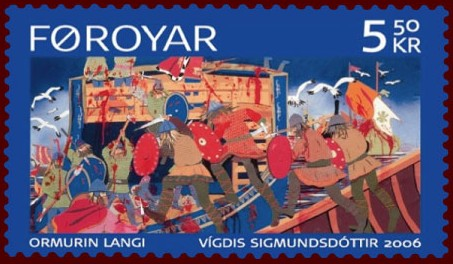
The battle, as depicted in a Faroese stamp commemorating the ballad

Ormurin Langi takes its subject matter from the account well given in Heimskringla of the famous sea battle off the island of Svolder in 1000, when the Swedish and Danish kings, together with the Norwegian Eiríkr Hákonarson, attacked the Norwegian king, Olaf Tryggvason, while he was on his way home from Wendland to Norway on his ship, the Long Serpent, accompanied by his fleet.

They attack in turn and King Olaf repulses the assaults of the two kings, but is defeated by his countryman Eiríkr Hákonarson.

The outcome of the battle is known; when Olaf realises that the battle is lost, he leaps overboard together with his surviving men. It is not known where this battle took place, with it being doubtful whether there ever was an island called Svolder.

In the ballad the poet has Olaf sailing from the Baltic into the Oresund between Denmark and Sweden, where he imagines the island to be located, and the battle takes place in the straits between the island and the mainland.

== Stamps ==
Various scenes from the drama described in the ballad appear on ten stamps, issued in 2006 by Postverk Føroya and designed by the artist Vigdis Sigmundsdóttir. They show shipbuilding and a launch, with the king sitting on the throne while giving an audience to Einarr Thambarskelfir. Another one shows the fleet putting out to sea. Another shows the Long Serpent and the other ships heading into the straits while their adversaries stand on the shore watching them. In the Long Serpent's bow there is Ulf the Red, Olaf's forecastle man, while the king and Einar the Archer are seen up on the quarterdeck. There are dead bodies tumbling into the sea during the battle, which ends with Eiríkr Hákonarson capturing the Long Serpent and so taking command of the vessel.

The location where the song is composed is unknown.

== Versions and history ==
The oldest version dates back to 1819 and was made by Jóannes í Króki of Sandur. He also collected a version in 1823.

When Svend Grundtvig and Jørgen Bloch edited Føroya kvæði, an anthology of Faroese folksongs, around 1880, they knew of six recordings of the ballad. A version in the poet's own hand turned up at a later date, but it is not known when it dates from.

Nowadays the ballad is referred to as Ormurin Langi (i.e. "The Long Serpent"), but that was not the title used by the poet himself. He referred to it as Olaf Trygvasons kvad ("The Ballad of Olaf Trygvason"), and other recorders did that as well, including Jóannes í Króki.

It was not until a version from around 1846 that it was discovered that the song got its title from Olaf Trygvason's ship, (Ormurin langi). When Hammershaimb had the ballad printed in his principal work, Færøsk Anthologi (A Faroese Anthology) of 1891, he used the title Ormurin langi, and the same title was used when it was serialised a few years earlier (1882) in the Dimmalætting newspaper.

The lyrics of the ballad vary slightly from version to version, but when the ballad is performed today, it is always in the form known from Færøsk Anthologi.

Nor do the old versions agree on which refrain (and therefore which tune) to use. The refrain that reigns supreme today is found in only one of the oldest versions. It is the one used in Færøsk Anthologi and is, incidentally, familiar from some of the old ballads. Færøsk Anthologi has had a standardising effect and its text has in some ways become the authorised version.

Faroese heavy metal band Týr recorded a version of the song for their debut album How Far to Asgaard. A live version appeared on their version appears on the live album A Night At The Nordic House where the performance was backed up by the Faroe Islands Symphony Orchestra.

The song appears in the Icelandic Viking movie In the Shadow of the Raven.

== See also ==
- Ormen Lange (longship)
