= Hryggjarstykki =

Lost Norse kings' saga

Hryggjarstykki (Mid 12th c. Old Norse: [ˈhrʏɡːjarˌstʏkːɪ]; Icelandic: [ˈr̥ɪcːarˌstɪhcɪ]) is a lost kings' saga written in Old Norse in the mid-twelfth century and dealing with near-contemporary events. The author was Eiríkr Oddsson, an Icelander about whom little is known. The work is cited by Snorri Sturluson in Heimskringla, where its reliability is emphasized.

Eirík wrote the book which is called Hryggjarstykki. In that book we are told about Harald Gilli and his two sons; also of Magnús the Blind and of Sigurd Slembe, down to their death. Eirík was a man of good understanding and had at that time been long in Norway. Some of his account he wrote according to what he was told by Hákon Maw, a landed-man under the two sons of Harald. Hákon and his sons took part in all these fights and counsels. Eirík mentions still other men who told him about these events, men who were both of good understanding and reliable. They were close by, so that they heard or saw what was happening. But some things he wrote according to what he himself heard or saw.

Eiríkr's account is also cited in Morkinskinna in a similar manner.

Now the story turns to the sons of King Haraldr, Ingi and Sigurðr, according to the account of the wise and discriminating man Eiríkr Oddsson. The tale is mostly from the report of the district chieftain Hákon magi, who presided and told of these events when they were first written down. He himself and his sons participated in these expeditions and most of the battles. He knew the men who are named here. He who wrote the story also named several truthful men as sources for the account.

The author of Fagrskinna also made use of Hryggjarstykki though he did not explicitly cite it. It has been suggested that Morkinskinna, Heimskringla and Fagrskinna made use of three different versions of Eiríkr's work.

Unlike most of the later kings' sagas Hryggjarstykki may have been an exclusively prose work, though it seems to have made some use of skaldic poetry. Earlier scholars believed the work had covered a substantial part of the 12th century, starting in the 1130s and going up to the 1160s or 1170s but more recent analysis indicates that Hryggjarstykki may only have covered the years 1136-1139. Its time of composition would then be around 1150, possibly making it the earliest saga.
