= Þórðr Kolbeinsson =

11th-century Icelandic skald

Þórðr Kolbeinsson (Thordr Kolbeinsson) was an 11th-century Icelandic skald, or poet. He was the court poet of Eiríkr Hákonarson and some 17 stanzas of his poetry on the earl are preserved in the kings' sagas. The following example is from Eiríkr's campaign in England with Canute the Great.

Gollkennir lét gunni (grœðis hests) fyr vestan (Þundr vá leyfðr til landa) Lundún saman bundit ; fekk regnþorinn Rökkva rann, of þingamönnum, ýglig högg, þars eggjar Ulfkell, bláar skulfu. Eiríksdrápa 11, Finnur Jónsson's edition	West of London the warrior went out to war, the famed sea, farer fought for land; sharp cuts had Ufkel when clashing over the carles steel-blue swords shone: so smoothly my stanzas, flow. Hermann Pálsson's translation	West of London town we passed, And our ocean-steeds made fast, And a bloody fight begin, England's lands to lose or win. Blue sword and shining spear Laid Ulfkel's dead corpse there, Our Thingmen hear the war-shower sounding Our grey arrows from their shields rebounding. Samuel Laing's translation

Þórðr is one of the two main characters of Bjarnar saga, where many lausavísur are attributed to him. Þórðr's son, Arnórr Þórðarson jarlaskáld, also became a prestigious poet.
