= Eric of Norway =

Eric of Norway may refer to:

- Eric I of Norway, Eric I Bloodaxe (reigned c.930-934)
- Eric II of Norway, Eric II Magnusson (reigned 1280–1299)
- Eric of Pomerania, Eric III of Norway (reigned 1389–1442)
- Eiríkr Hákonarson, earl who was de facto ruler of Norway 1000-1014
