= Þórðr Sjáreksson =

Icelandic poet

Þórðr Sjáreksson was an 11th-century Icelandic skald. He composed a drápa on Þórólfr Skólmsson, four strophes of which have been preserved in the kings' sagas. He also composed a memorial drápa on the canonised Olaf II of Norway, called Róðadrápa (Drápa of the Rood), one strophe of which is preserved. A few disjoint strophes by Þórðr on different subjects are also preserved in Skáldskaparmál. Skáldatal reckons Þórðr among the court poets of both Óláfr Haraldsson and Eiríkr Hákonarson.

In Óláfs saga Tryggvasonar en mesta a short story is told of Þórðr. In the reign of Olaf II, he had travelled to the Holy Land intending to visit Jerusalem. On the way he meets a mysterious tall man who converses with him in the Norse tongue and tells him to go back since the road ahead isn't safe. The stranger asks Þórðr if he knows Hjalti Skeggiason and Þórðr tells him that they are related by marriage. The stranger asks Þórðr to bring Hjalti his greeting and tells him a story to bring Hjalti so that he will recognize who he his. Þórðr does as he is bid and when he brings the stranger's greeting to Hjalti, he is told that the man must have been Olaf Tryggvason, still walking the earth long after his defeat at the Battle of Svolder.
