= Eysteinn Ásgrímsson =

Icelandic poet

Eysteinn Ásgrímsson (c. 1310 – March 14, 1361) was an Icelandic monk, ecclesiastical inspector, and skald (poet); Lilja, the best known and possibly the best medieval Icelandic Christian poem, is attributed to him.

== Life ==
Eysteinn Ásgrímsson was at the Abbey of Þykkvabær until 1343, when he was sent to prison for beating up the abbot and possibly also for breaking his vow of chastity. This may have been when he composed Lilja, which is marked by a deep concern with sinfulness. After his release he was sent to the monastery at Helgafell and then became an official at the see of Skálholt. He went to Norway in 1355 with the bishop and returned in 1357 as an inspector of the Skálholt see; the bishop was so angry at this appointment that he excommunicated him. After returning to Norway in 1360, Eysteinn died the following March at the Helgisetr monastery in Niðarós (Trondheim).

== Lilja ==
Lilja ("the lily", in medieval Christian imagery symbolizing purity and thus also the Virgin Mary), is generally attributed to Eysteinn and is the best known and possibly the best of the medieval Icelandic poems that adapted the complex structure and diction of skaldic poetry to Christian subjects. It consists of 100 verses surveying the religious history of man, with the Passion and Crucifixion in the center. Eysteinn avoided both complicated kennings and loan-words as far he could, modifying the skaldic tradition on classical models based on the Christian ideal of claritas as enunciated by St. Thomas Aquinas, and rather than dróttkvætt, composed the poem in the hrynhent meter, which was closer to Latin hymnody and was subsequently nicknamed liljulag after the poem. The poem's numerology includes the hundred verses corresponding to the number of letters in Ave Maria, and so the poem has traditionally been interpreted as dedicated to the Virgin Mary.

The poem was emulated in the 15th century and an edited version included in the 1612 Icelandic Protestant anthology Vísnabók.

== Editions ==
- Finnur Jónsson, ed. (1915). Den norsk-islandske skjaldedigtning. Vol. BII (4). Copenhagen / Christiania: Kommissionen for den Arnamagnæanske Legat, Gyldendal. pp. 390–416. Archived from the original on 2012-04-06 – via Skaldic Poetry of the Scandinavian Middle Ages. (Volume with Danish translation viewable online in the US at the HathiTrust).
- Martin Chase, ed. (2007). "Lilja — Anon" (with translation). Skaldic Poetry of the Scandinavian Middle Ages.
- Eiríkr Magnússon, ed. (1870). Lilja (The Lily): An Icelandic Religious Poem of the Fourteenth Century (with translation). London: Williams & Norgate.
