= Correlative verse =

Poetic device

Correlative verse is a literary device used in poetry around the world; it is characterized by the matching of items in two different pluralities. An example is found in an epigram from the Greek Anthology: "You [wine, are] boldness, youth, strength, wealth, country [first plurality] / to the shy, the old, the weak, the poor, the foreigner (second plurality]". Another example is found in a couplet by 16th-century poet George Peele: "Beauty, strength, youth, are flowers but fading seen; / Duty, faith, love, are roots, and ever green".

Characteristically notorious for correlative verse is Old Norse poetry, which proffers such cryptic examples as Þórðr Særeksson's:

Varð sjálf sonar
nama snotr una—
Kjalarr of tamði—
kváðut Hamði—
—Goðrún bani
—goðbrúðr Vani
—heldr vel mara
—hörleik spara.

Became herself of her son—
Did not come to love—
Kjallarr (Óðinn) tamed—
It is said that Hamðir did not—
—Guðrún the slayer
—the bride of the gods the Vanr
—rather well horses
—bow-warfare hold back.

where the elemental pattern is ABCDABCD, i.e. "Varð sjálf sonar...Goðrún bani" (Became herself of her son Guðrún the slayer), etc.

== See also ==
- Hendiatris
- Parallelism (grammar)
