= Þórðr =

Þórðr is a given name. Notable people with the name include:

- Þórðr Kolbeinsson, 11th century Icelandic skald
- Þórðr Sjáreksson, 11th century Icelandic skald
- Þórðr Sturluson, brother of Snorri Sturluson
