= Arnórr jarlaskáld =

Icelandic skald

Arnórr Þórðarson jarlaskáld
- Occupation: Skald
- Writing career
- Language: Old Norse
- Years active: 9th century
- Period: Viking Age
- Notable work: Hrynhenda
- Literary movement: Skaldic poetry

Arnórr Þórðarson jarlaskáld (Poet of Earls) (c. 1012 – 1070s) was an Icelandic skald, son of Þórðr Kolbeinsson. Arnórr travelled as a merchant and often visited Orkney where he composed poems for the Earls, receiving his byname. For king Magnus the Good, he composed Hrynhenda. He also composed memorial poems for Magnus the Good and Haraldr harðráði. He is considered one of the major skalds of the 11th century.

== See also ==
- List of Icelandic writers
- Icelandic literature
