= Norwegian synoptics =

The Norwegian synoptics are three of the earliest kings' sagas. They give brief overviews of the history of Norway from legendary times up to the 12th century. They are thought to have been written in the period 1180–1220. Two of them are written in Latin while one is written in Old Norse.

== Historia Norwegie ==
Historia Norwegie begins with the legendary Ynglingar and ends with the return of St. Olaf to Norway. It includes a geographical description of Norway and Iceland.

== Historia de Antiquitate Regum Norwagiensium ==
Historia de Antiquitate Regum Norwagiensium was written by a monk named Theodoricus, about whom little is known, and dedicated to Archbishop Eysteinn (d. 1188). It begins with Harald Fairhair and ends with the death of Sigurd the Crusader (1130). Despite its short length, the work includes fairly lengthy digressions, intended to have exemplary value.

== Ágrip af Nóregskonungasögum ==
Both the beginning and end of Ágrip are lost but the original scope of the work was probably from the legendary Halfdan the Black and down to 1177. Ágrip may be regarded as a bridge between the learned Latin works and the later kings' sagas.
