= Einarr Helgason =

10th-century Icelandic poet

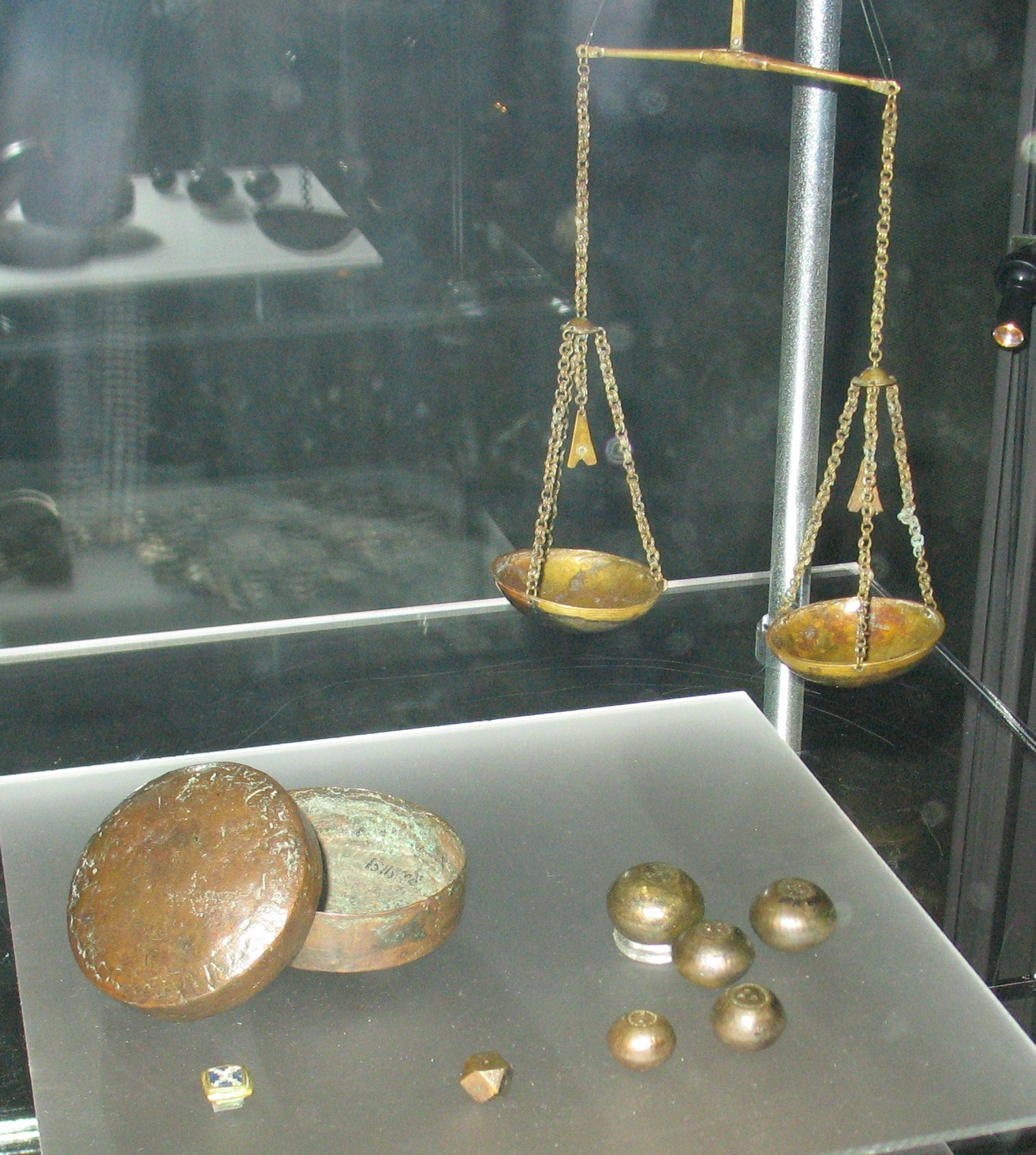
Viking Age scales

Einarr Helgason, (Note: Old Norse: [ˈɛinˌɑrː ˈhelɡɑˌson], [ˈskɑːlɑˌɡlɑmː]; Modern Icelandic: Einar ... [ˈeiːnˌaːr ˈhɛlkaˌsɔːn], [ˈskauːlaˌklamː]) known by the epithet skálaglamm ("tinkle-scales"), was a 10th-century Icelandic skald. He was a court poet of Lord Hákon to whom he dedicated his magnum opus, the Vellekla (Gold Dearth). Einarr's added name skálaglamm means "tinkle-scales" and refers to a set of balances and weights with divinatory powers, given to him by Hákon.

The part of Einarr's poetry that has come down to us is preserved in the Kings' sagas, the Prose Edda, Egils saga and Jómsvíkinga saga. According to Egils saga, Einarr was a friend of Egill Skalla-Grímsson and once gave him a decorated shield which he had received in Norway. Egill was greatly displeased since tradition compelled him to compose a drápa on the shield.

According to Landnámabók and other sources, Einarr drowned in Breiðafjörður.
