= Ágrip af Nóregskonungasögum =

Old Norse text

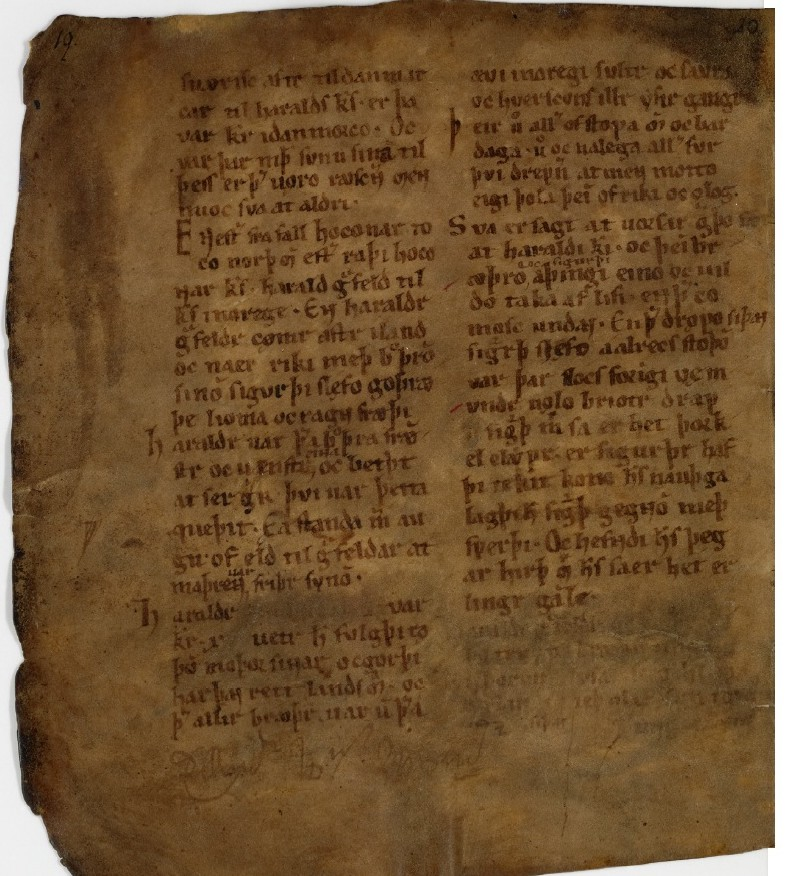
Ágrip AM 325 II 4to, folio 5v from the Arnamagnæan Manuscript Collection.

Ágrip af Nóregskonungasögum (Icelandic for "Summary of the Norwegian Kings' Sagas"), often shortened to Ágrip, is a history of the kings of Norway. Written in Old Norse, it is, along with the Historia Norvegiæ, one of the Norwegian synoptic histories.

The preserved text starts with the death of Hálfdan svarti (c. 860) and ends with the accession of Ingi krókhryggr (1136) but the original is thought to have covered a longer period, probably up to the reign of Sverrir (1184–1202). The work was composed by an unknown Norwegian writer around 1190. The only surviving manuscript is Icelandic from the first half of the thirteenth century. The preserved parchment book consists of four quires, a fifth quire has been lost. The first leaf is also missing, therefore the original title of the book, if it had any, is unknown. The name Ágrip af Nóregskonungasögum ("A Synopsis of the Sagas of the Kings of Norway") was first used in an edition in 1835.

Ágrip is often compared with the two other Norwegian synoptic histories from the same period, Historia Norvegiae and the work of Theodoricus monachus. It broke ground by being the first one written in the vernacular. Ágrip is also the first of the kings' sagas to quote skaldic poetry in the text. The narrative is brief, and much less detailed than the narratives of the later kings' sagas, such as Fagrskinna and Heimskringla. The story is noticeably more detailed in descriptions of events and locations in the Trøndelag region and the city of Nidaros. Together with linguistic factors, this has been seen as an indication that the work was composed in Nidaros.

Ágrip has been translated to Danish (1834), Latin (1835), German (1929), Norwegian (nynorsk) (1936), English (1995), Russian (2017) and Norwegian (bokmål) (2022).

== Other sources ==
- Bjarni Einarsson (editor). Íslenzk fornrit XXIX : Ágrip af Nóregskonunga sǫgum : Fagrskinna - Nóregs konunga tal. Reykjavík: Hið íslenzka fornritafélag, 1984.
- Driscoll, M. J. (editor and translator). Ágrip af Nóregskonungasǫgum. Viking Society for Northern Research Text Series 10. 2nd ed. 2008 (1995). . ISBN 0-903521-27-X
