= Fagrskinna =

Old Norse saga written around 1220

Fagrskinna (Old Norse: Old Norse pronunciation: [ˈfɑɣrˌskinːɑ]; Icelandic: Fagurskinna [ˈfaːɣʏrˌscɪnːa]; trans. "Fair Leather" from the type of parchment) is one of the kings' sagas, written around 1220. It is assumed to be a source for what is known as the Heimskringla, containing histories of Norwegian kings from the 9th to 12th centuries, as well as skaldic verse.

== Description ==
Fagrskinna is one of the kings' sagas, written around 1220. It takes its name from one of the manuscripts in which it was preserved, Fagrskinna meaning 'Fair Leather', i.e., 'Fair Parchment'. Fagrskinna proper was destroyed by fire, but copies of it and another vellum have been preserved.

An immediate source for the Heimskringla of Snorri Sturluson, Fagrskinna is a central text in the genre of kings' sagas. It contains a vernacular history of Norway from the ninth to the twelfth centuries, from the career of Halfdan the Black to the Battle of Re in 1177, and includes extensive citation of skaldic verses, some of them preserved nowhere else. It has a heavy emphasis on battles, such as the Battle of Hjörungavágr and the Battle of Svolder. The book is often thought to have been written in Norway, either by an Icelander or a Norwegian.

Apart from making use of skaldic poetry and oral tradition, the author drew extensively on written texts of the kings' sagas. The following sources have been proposed as having been the most decisive:

1. a lost work by the Icelandic priest Sæmundr fróði Sigfússon (1056-1133)
2. a lost version of Ágrip af Nóregs konunga sögum (c. 1190)
3. a lost synoptic work about the earliest Norwegian kings (c. 1200–1220)
4. a lost version of the Jómsvíkinga saga (c. 1200)
5. Hlaðajarla saga (c. 1200)
6. Óláfs saga Tryggvasonar from a version by Oddr Snorrason (c. 1190)
7. a lost version of Óláfs saga helga
8. Knúts saga ríka (after 1200)
9. Morkinskinna (c. 1220)
10. the lost Hryggjarstykki (c. 1150)

== Editions and translations ==
- Einarsson, Bjarni, ed. (1984), Ágrip af Nóregskonungasogum: Fagrskinna – Nóregs konunga tal
- Jónsson, Finnur, ed. (1902–1908), Fagrskinna. Nóregs Kononga Tal
- Munch, P.A.; Unger, C. R., eds. (1847), Fagrskinna. Kortfattet Norsk Konge-saga
- Fagrskinna: A Catalogue of the Kings of Norway, translated by Alison, Finlay, Brill Academic Publishers, 2004, ISBN 90-04-13172-8 , based primarily on Einarsson's 1984 edition
