= Gunnlaugr ormstunga =

Icelandic poet

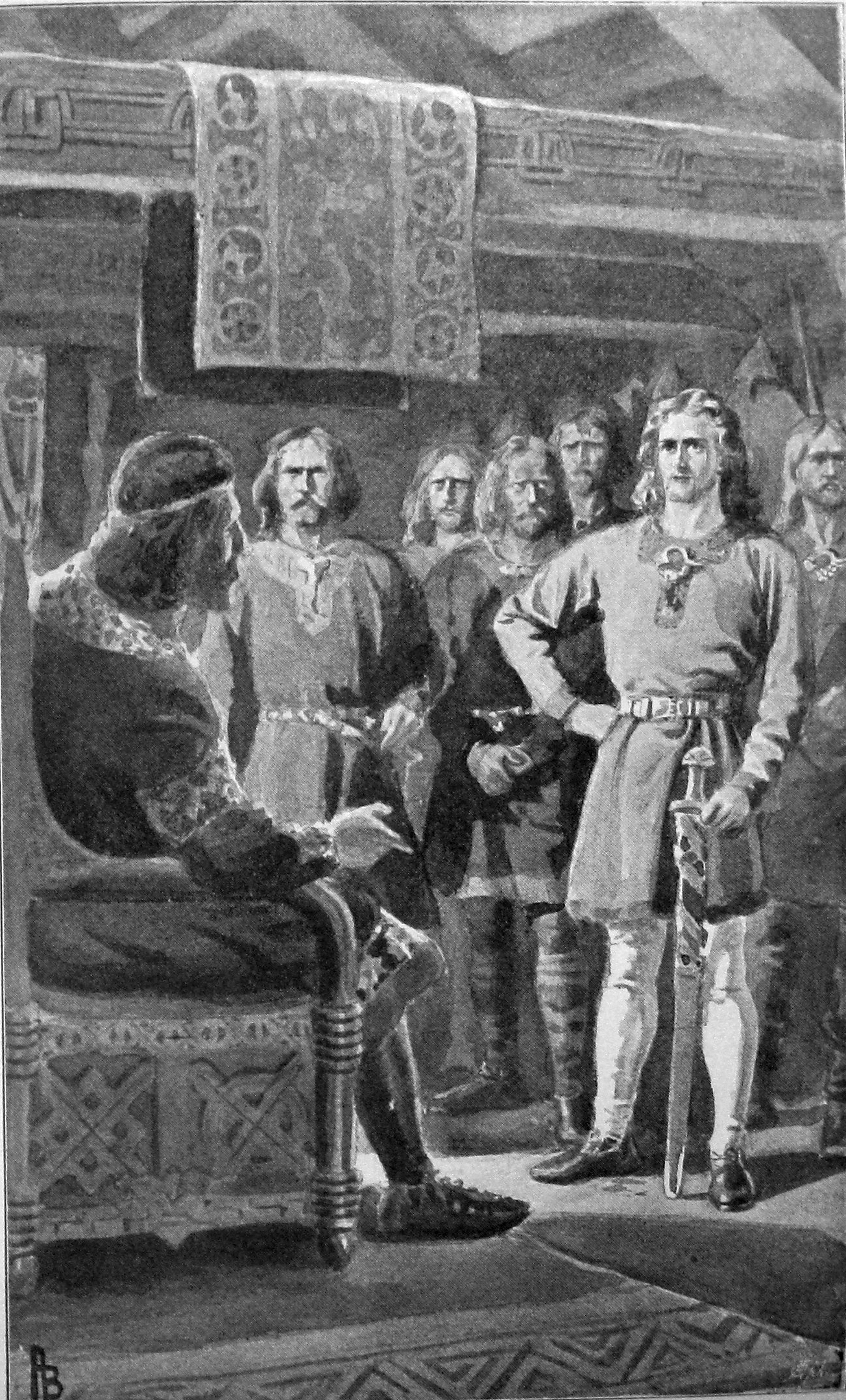
Gunnlaugr ormstunga before Eiríkr Hákonarson, Published in Gunnlaugs saga ormstungu Illustration by Andreas Bloch (1898)

Gunnlaugr ormstunga (Old Norse: [ˈɡunːˌlɔuɣz̠ ˈormsˌtʰuŋɡɑ]; Icelandic: Gunnlaugur ormstunga [ˈkʏnːˌlœyːɣʏr ˈɔ(r)msˌtʰuŋka]; "serpent-tongue"; c. 983–1008) was an Icelandic skald. His life is described in Gunnlaugs saga ormstungu, where several of his poems are preserved.

Gunnlaugr was born ca. 983. From an early age he proved himself impetuous, audacious, brave, and tough. He was also a skilled author of mostly derogatory poems, which earned him the cognomen ormstunga "serpent-tongue". After a quarrel with his father, Illugi, Gunnlaugr left his home at the age of twelve to stay for some time at Borg with Þorsteinn Egilsson, the son of Egill Skallagrímsson. There, he became acquainted with Þorsteinn's daughter, Helga the fair, reputedly the most beautiful woman on Iceland. Her hair was so ample that she could hide herself in it.

When Gunnlaugr was eighteen, he went abroad. At that time, Helga became his fiancée, on the condition that she would wait no more than three years for Gunnlaugr. He visited the courts of Norway, Ireland, Orkney and Sweden and England. In Sweden, he visited the court of King Óláfr Skötkonung where he met his rival, the Icelandic champion and skald, Hrafn Önundarson.

Gunnlaugr's stay in the service of King Æthelred of England delayed his return to Iceland and Helga. He did not return until four years had passed (ca. 1005). Since Gunnlaugr had been gone longer than his allotted three years, Helga was forced into an unhappy marriage to Gunnlaugr's rival, Hrafn Önundarson. Gunnlaugr and Hrafn met at the Althing and Gunnlaugr challenged Hrafn to a hólmganga or duel of honour. The duel ended in a draw and was the last one allowed in Iceland. From that time, hólmgǫngur were forbidden by the Gray Goose Laws.

In order to settle their dispute in blood, the two champions met in the Kingdom of Norway in the spring of 1008. There, Gunnlaugr defeated Hrafn, but was fatally wounded. After a short time he died. He was 25. Helga later remarried, but never recovered from Gunnlaugr's death. Her greatest pleasure was to rest her eyes on a sumptuous coat that Gunnlaugr had given her. One evening, she rested her head on her husband's shoulder, spread the coat in front of her, and watched it for a while. Thereafter, she fell back into her husband's embrace and was dead.

== Other sources ==
- Whaley, Diana (2002) Sagas of Warrior-Poets (Penguin) ISBN 978-0140447712
- Hreinsson, Vidar (1997) The Complete Sagas of Icelanders (Leifur Eiriksson Publishing) ISBN 978-9979929307
