= Historia Norwegiæ =

12–13th century Latin history of Norway

Historia Norwegiæ is a brief history of Norway written in Latin by an anonymous monk. The only surviving copy is in the private possession of the Earl of Dalhousie, and is now kept in the National Records of Scotland in Edinburgh. This manuscript contains eight historical texts in total, with the Historia in folios 1r–12r. The manuscript was copied around 1500–1510, but the work itself is considered to have been written much earlier. Scholarly estimates on its date of composition have ranged from the 1150s to as late as c. 1300, but a majority of researchers favor a date between 1170 and 1220.

Historia Norwegiæ belongs to a group of medieval Norwegian histories known as the "Norwegian synoptics," alongside the Latin Historia de antiquitate regum Norwagiensium by Theodoricus monachus and the Old Norse vernacular text Ágrip af Nóregskonungasögum.

== Contents ==
Historia Norwegiæ consists of three parts:

1. A short geographical survey of Norway and its dominions, followed by a brief history of Norway
2. Genealogy of the Earls of Orkney
3. Catalogue of the Kings of Norway

One of Historia Norwegiæ's important features is a Latin translation of an independent version of Þjóðólfr of Hvinir's skaldic poem Ynglingatal. Besides that text, there is the Ynglinga saga in Snorri Sturluson's Heimskringla. The text also contains ethnographic details, including a description of a shamanic séance among the Sami people. It is the earliest preserved written source for many of its historical details.

== Dates ==
The Historia is thought to have been written, at the earliest, sometime between 1160 and 1175. This dating, however, is under debate and 1220 may be more accurate. The text refers to both a volcanic eruption and an earthquake in 1211 as contemporary events, and Orkney is stated to be under Norwegian rule. The text may have been composed somewhere in eastern Norway.

The manuscript was published by Peter Andreas Munch in 1850 as Symbolæ ad Historiam Antiquiorem Rerum Norwegicarum. The standard edition was that of Storm (1880) for many years, and the first English translation was done by Kunin and Phelpstead (2001). A new critical edition and translation appeared in 2003.

== Sources ==
- Ekrem, Inger (editor), Lars Boje Mortensen (editor) and Peter Fisher (translator) (2003). Historia Norwegie. Museum Tusculanum Press. ISBN 87-7289-813-5
- Phelpstead, Carl, ed. (2001). A History of Norway and the Passion and Miracles of the Blessed Óláf (PDF). Translated by Kunin, Debra. London: Viking Society for Northern Research, University College London.
- Storia della Norvegia. Historia Norwegie (XII sec.), Italian transl. with parallel Latin text, ed. Piero Bugiani, Vocifuoriscena, Viterbo 2017.
- Storm, Gustav (editor) (1880). Monumenta historica Norwegiæ: Latinske kildeskrifter til Norges historie i middelalderen, Monumenta Historica Norwegiae (Kristiania: Brøgger)
- Nordisk familjebok
- Notes and Queries, Issue 56
