= Theodoric the Monk =

Norwegian historian and monk

Theodoric the Monk (Latin: Theodoricus monachus; also Tjodrik munk; in Old Norse his name was most likely Þórir) was a 12th-century Norwegian Benedictine monk, perhaps at the Nidarholm Abbey. He may be identical with either Bishop Tore of the Diocese of Hamar or Archbishop Tore Gudmundsson, of the Archdiocese of Nidaros who both went under the Latin name Theodoricus in the Abbey of St. Victor, Paris.

Theodoric wrote a brief history of the kings of Norway in Latin, Historia de Antiquitate Regum Norwagiensium sometime between 1177 and 1188. The work covers Norwegian history from the reign of the 9th century King Haraldr hárfagri up to the death of King Sigurðr Jórsalafari in 1130. His work, which was dedicated to Archbishop Eystein Erlendsson of Nidaros (1161-1188), remains an important source to the oldest parts of Norway's modern-time history. In his work, Theodoricus left out the most recent period of Norwegian history. Theodoric states that he considered it "utterly unfitting to record for posterity the crimes, killings, perjuries, parricides, desecrations of holy places, the contempt for God, the plundering no less of the clergy than of the whole people, the abductions of women and other abominations which it would take long to enumerate" which followed the death of King Sigurðr.

Theodoric's work is one of the Norwegian synoptics, the oldest preserved kings' sagas. The others include Historia Norwegie and Ágrip af Nóregskonungasögum. Theodoric relied heavily on Icelandic sources, possibly including the Oldest Saga of St. Olaf and Oddr Snorrason's Óláfs saga Tryggvasonar.

== See also ==
- Civil war era in Norway

== Bibliography ==
- Theodoricus monachus (translated and annotated by David and Ian McDougall with an introduction by Peter Foote) (1998). The Ancient History of the Norwegian Kings. Viking Society for Northern Research. ISBN 0-903521-40-7.
- Bagge, Sverre (2011) Theodoricus Monachus: The Kingdom of Norway and the History of Salvation (Chapter 4, Historical Narratives and Christian Identity on a European Periphery Editor: Ildar H. Garipzanov, Publisher: Turnhout Brepols) ISBN 978-2-503-53367-4
