= Ormrinn langi =

10th century Norwegian longship

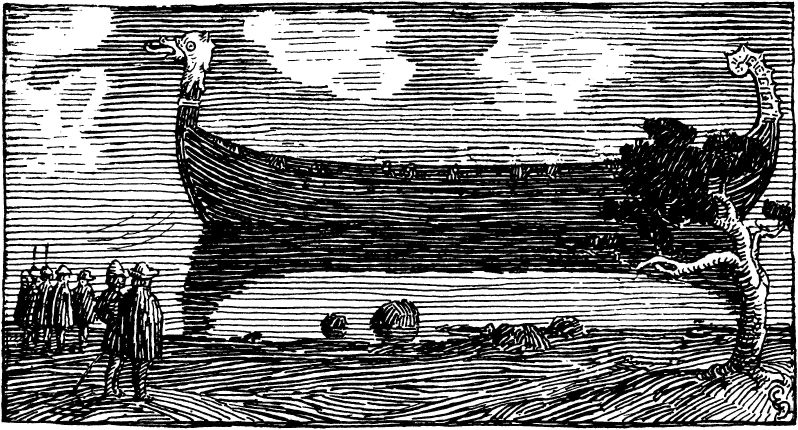
Ormen Lange by Halfdan Egedius

Ormrinn langi (Old Norse for "the long Serpent", lit. 'the Worm long', ie, "the long Dragon") was one of the most famous of the Viking longships. It was built for the Norwegian King Olaf Tryggvason, and was the largest and most powerful longship of its day. In the late 990s, King Olaf was on a "Crusade" around the country to bring Christianity to Norway. When he was traveling north to Hålogaland, he ended up in battle with forces of Raud the Strong, who refused to convert to Christianity. Olaf eventually captured Raud, and gave him two choices: convert or die. The Sagas say that Olaf tried to convert him but Raud cursed the name of Jesus, and the King became so enraged that he, using either the hollow stalk of an angelica or his horn and a red-hot iron, forced a snake down Raud's throat, which ate its way out of the side of the torso of Raud and killed him. Thereafter, Olaf confiscated Raud's riches, not least of which was Raud's ship, which he rechristened Ormen (modern Norwegian version of the name, meaning The Serpent). He took it to Trondheim and used it as a design for his own new ship, which he made a couple of "rooms" longer than Ormen and named Ormen Lange (modern Norwegian translation, meaning The Long Serpent).

The ship reportedly had 34 rooms, i.e., was built with 34 pairs of oars, for a crew of 68 rowers (and additional crew members). Extrapolating from archeological evidence (e.g., the Gokstad ship), this would make Ormen Lange nearly 45 metres (148 ft) long. The ship's sides were unusually high, "as high as that of a Knarr".

Ormen Lange was the last ship to be taken in the Battle of Svolder, where Olaf was killed (although his body was never found—some stories tell of the king jumping into the water either sinking due to the weight of his armour or escaping in the confusion) by a coalition of his enemies in the year 1000.

Its story is told in a traditional style Faroese ballad, or Kvæði, called "Ormurin Langi", albeit written around 1830 during a resurge in interest of this otherwise medieval-origin type of ballad.
