= Oddr Snorrason =

12th-century Icelandic monk

Oddr Snorrason whose name is also sometimes Anglicized as Odd Snorrason was a 12th-century Icelandic Benedictine monk at the Þingeyraklaustur monastery (Þingeyrarklaustur). The monastery was founded in 1133 and was the first in Iceland.

== Work ==
One Latin version of the Óláfs saga Tryggvasonar is attributed to Oddr – the original work has been almost completely lost but a translation into Old Norse is preserved in two nearly complete versions and a fragment of a third. Oddr made use of previous written works including those of Sæmundr fróði and Ari Þorgilsson as well as Acta sanctorum in Selio and possibly Historia de Antiquitate Regum Norwagiensium. In turn Snorri Sturluson made use of Oddr's work when writing the Heimskringla, as did the author of Óláfs saga Tryggvasonar en mesta.

Yngvars saga víðförla also credits Oddr with its original authorship. Scholars have been skeptical towards this claim but in recent years it has gained more acceptance.
