= Finnur Jónsson =

Icelandic-Danish philologist and Professor of Nordic Philology

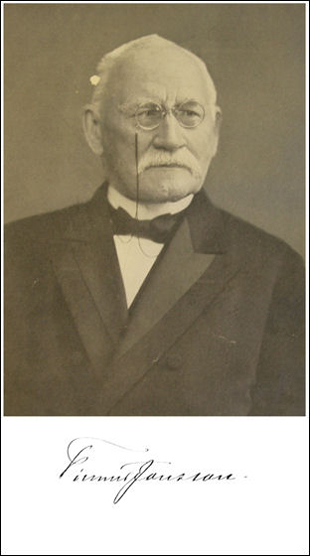
Finnur Jónsson

Finnur Jónsson (May 29, 1858 – March 30, 1934) was an Icelandic philologist and Professor of Nordic Philology at the University of Copenhagen. He made extensive contributions to the study of Old Norse literature.

Finnur Jónsson was born at Akureyri in northern Iceland. He graduated from Menntaskólinn í Reykjavík in 1878 and went to Denmark for further studies at the University of Copenhagen. He received a doctorate in philology in 1884 with a dissertation on skaldic poetry. He became a docent at the university in 1887 and a professor in 1898, serving until 1928. After retiring he continued work on his subject with new publications until the year he died.

He was elected member of the Royal Society of Arts and Sciences in Gothenburg in 1905 and corresponding member of the Royal Swedish Academy of Letters, History and Antiquities in 1908.

Finnur's principal area of study was Old Norse poetry. His three most important works are Den norsk-islandske skjaldedigtning, an edition of the entire corpus of skaldic poetry in two parts – one which gives the text of the manuscripts with variants and one which gives a normalized text and a Danish translation. Another of Finnur's major works is Lexicon Poeticum, a dictionary of Old Norse poetry, ostensibly an update of a work with the same name by Sveinbjörn Egilsson but in effect an original work. The third principal work is Den oldnorske og oldislandske litteraturs historie, a detailed history of Old Norse literature.

Finnur was an unusually prolific scholar, preparing editions of, among other works, numerous Icelanders' sagas, Kings' sagas, Rímur (along with a dictionary of rímur) and the Eddas. A skilled polemicist, he defended his belief in the historical accuracy of the sagas and the antiquity of the Eddic poems in debates with other scholars.

== Other sources ==
- Jón Helgason (1934). "Mindeord om Finnur Jónsson" in Aarbøger for nordisk Oldkyndighed og Historie, 1934, pp. 137–60.
