= Skald =

Old Norse poet

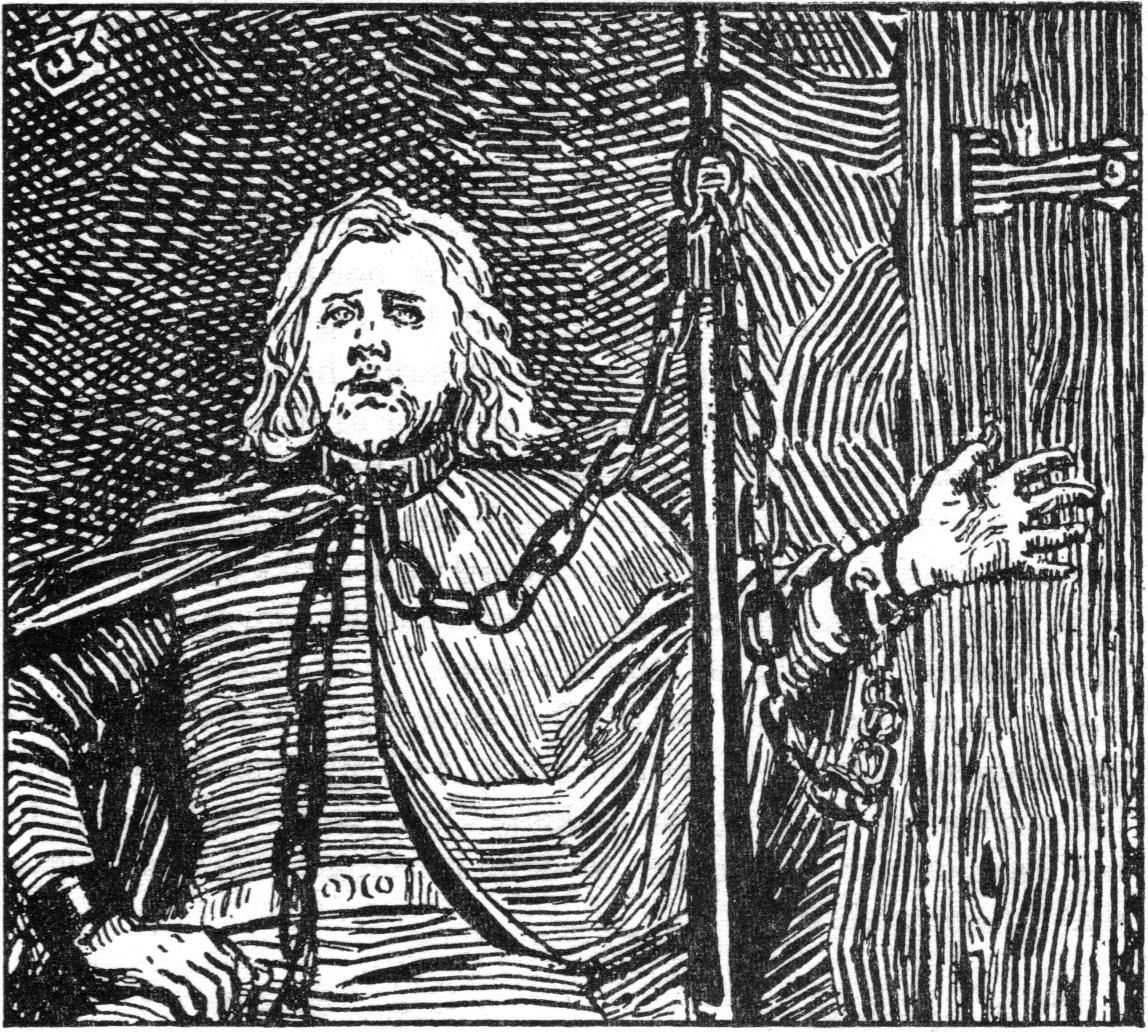
Bersi Skáldtorfuson, in chains, composing poetry after he was captured by King Óláfr Haraldsson (illustration by Christian Krohg for an 1899 edition of Heimskringla)

A skald, or skáld (Old Norse: [ˈskɔːld]; Icelandic: [ˈskault], meaning 'poet'), is one of the often named poets who composed skaldic poetry, one of the two kinds of Old Norse poetry in alliterative verse, the other being Eddic poetry. Skaldic poems were traditionally composed to honor kings, but were sometimes ex tempore. They include both extended works and single verses (lausavísur). They are characteristically more ornate in form and diction than eddic poems, employing many kennings, which require some knowledge of Norse mythology, and heiti, which are formal nouns used in place of more prosaic synonyms. Dróttkvætt metre is a type of skaldic verse form that most often use internal rhyme and alliteration.

More than 5,500 skaldic verses have survived, preserved in more than 700 manuscripts, including in several sagas and in Snorri Sturluson's Prose Edda, a handbook of skaldic composition that led to a revival of the art. Many of these verses are fragments of originally longer works, and the authorship of many is unknown. The earliest known skald from whom verses survive is Bragi Boddason, known as Bragi the Old, a Norwegian skald of the first half of the 9th century. Most known skalds were attached to the courts of Norwegian kings during the Viking Age, and increasingly were Icelanders. The subject matter of their extended poems was sometimes mythical before the conversion to Christianity, thereafter usually historical and encomiastic, detailing the deeds of the skald's patron. The tradition continued into the Late Middle Ages.

The standard edition of the skaldic poetic corpus, Den norsk-islandske skjaldedigtning, was edited by Finnur Jónsson and published in 1908–1915. A new edition was prepared online by the Skaldic Poetry of the Scandinavian Middle Ages project and began publication in 2007.

== Etymology ==
The word skald (which internal rhymes show to have had a short vowel until the 14th century) is perhaps ultimately related to Proto-Germanic: *skalliz, lit. 'sound, voice, shout' (Old High German: skal, lit. 'sound'). Old High German has skalsang, 'song of praise, psalm', and skellan, 'ring, clang, resound'. The Old High German variant stem skeltan, etymologically identical to the skald- stem (Proto-Germanic: *skeldan), means "to scold, blame, accuse, insult". The person doing the insulting is a skelto or skeltāri. The West Germanic counterpart of the skald is the scop. Like scop, which is related to Modern English scoff, the word skald is probably cognate with English scold, reflecting the importance of mocking taunts in the poetry of the skalds.

== Skaldic poetry ==
A minstrel sings of famous deeds by J. R. Skelton, c. 1909

Skaldic poetry and Eddic poetry stem from the same tradition of alliterative verse, and in Old Norse as well as Icelandic, the word skald simply means "poet" or "composer". Skaldic verse is distinguished from Eddic by characteristically being more complex in style and by using dróttkvætt ("court metre"), which requires internal rhyme as well as alliteration, rather than the simpler and older fornyrðislag ("way of ancient words"), ljóðaháttr ("song form"), and málaháttr ("speech form") metres of the Eddic poems. Skaldic poetry is also characteristically more ornate in its diction, using more interlacing of elements of meaning within the verse and many more kennings and heiti. This both assisted in meeting the greater technical demands of the metre and allowed the poets to display their skill in wordplay. The resulting complexity can appear somewhat hermetic to modern readers, as well as creating ambiguity in interpretation; but the original audiences would have been familiar with the conventions of the syntactic interweaving as well as the vocabulary of the kennings.

Eddic poems are characterized by their mythological, ethical, and heroic content, while skaldic verse has a wider range of subject matter. One of the main topics was mighty kings and the deeds of courtly patrons. Eddic poetry typically includes a large amount of dialogue and rarely recounts battles; skaldic poetry, the reverse. Skalds also composed spontaneous verses reacting to events, insult verses (níðvísur) such as Þorleifr jarlsskáld's curse on his former patron Jarl Hákon Sigurðarson and the níð that provoked the missionary Þangbrandr into killing Vetrliði Sumarliðason, and occasionally love poems and erotic verse called mansöngr. Hallfreðr Óttarsson and especially Kormákr Ögmundarson are known for their love poetry.

A large amount of Eddic poetry has been preserved in the Codex Regius manuscript. Skaldic verses are preserved in a large number of manuscripts, including many sagas, and some skaldic poetry, including prophetic, dream, and memorial poems, uses the simpler metres. Medieval Scandinavians appear to have distinguished between older and more modern poetry rather than considering skaldic verse as a distinct genre.

Compositions done without preparation were especially valued, to judge by the sagas. Egill Skallagrímsson is supposed to have composed his Höfuðlausn in one night to ransom his head. King Harald Hardrada is said to have set his skald, Þjóðólfr Arnórsson, as he was walking down the street, to compose two stanzas casting a quarreling smith and tanner through the choice of kennings as specific figures first from mythology and then from heroic legend. It is not common though that skaldic verse are a spur of the moment thing.

Although there is no evidence that the skalds employed musical instruments, some speculate that they may have accompanied their verses with the harp or lyre.

=== Forms ===
A large number of the preserved skaldic verses are individual stanzas, called lausavísur ("loose verses"), often said to have been improvised. Long forms include the drápa, a praise poem consisting of a series of stanzas with a refrain (stef) at intervals, and the flokkr (similar to drápa, without a refrain), vísur 'verses, stanzas', or dræplingr 'little drápa', a shorter series of verses without refrain. There are also some shield poems, which supposedly describe mythological scenes on a shield presented to the poet by a patron.

=== Poems ===
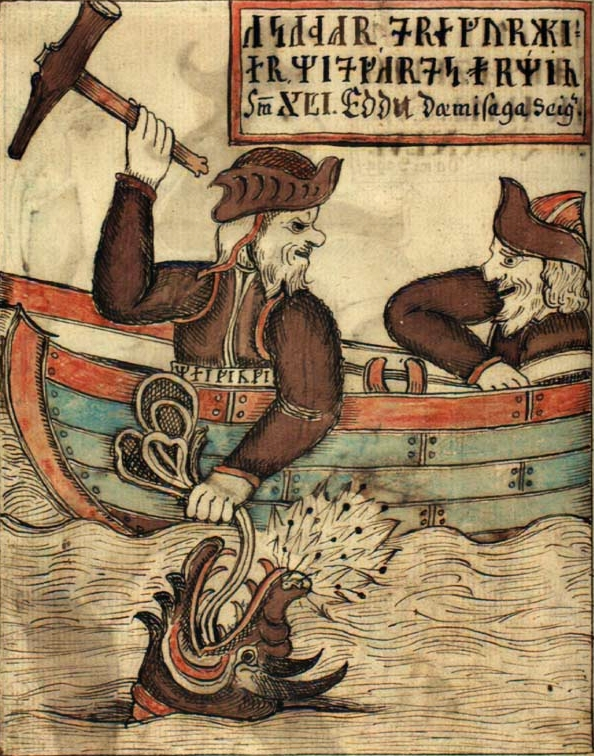
Illustration from the 18th-century Icelandic manuscript NKS 1867 of Thor's fight with the World Serpent, the subject of early skaldic verses by Bragi Boddason and Úlfr Uggason

Most of the longer skaldic poems were composed by court poets to honor kings and jarls. They typically have historical content, relating battles and other deeds from the king's career. Examples include:

- Glymdrápa ‒ the deeds of King Harald Fairhair, by Þorbjörn Hornklofi, partially preserved
- Vellekla ‒ the deeds of Jarl Hákon Sigurðarson, by Einarr skálaglamm, partially preserved
- Bandadrápa ‒ the deeds of Jarl Eiríkr Hákonarson by Eyjólfr dáðaskáld, partially preserved
- Knútsdrápa ‒ the deeds of King Cnut the Great, three poems by Sigvatr Þórðarson, Óttarr svarti, and Óttarr svarti (partially preserved)
- Geisli ‒ the deeds of King Olaf Haraldsson, Saint Olaf, a Christian drápa by Einarr Skúlason
- Hrafnsmál ‒ by Þorbjörn Hornklofi describing life and martial deeds of Harald Fairhair

A few surviving skaldic poems have mythological content:

- Ragnarsdrápa, a shield poem by Bragi Boddason, partially preserved: originally consisted of sections on two mythological scenes and two from the deeds of his patron, Ragnarr
- Haustlöng ‒ a shield poem by Þjóðólfr of Hvinir, partially preserved
- Húsdrápa ‒ by Úlfr Uggason describing mythological scenes depicted on the walls of Olaf the Peacock's feast hall in Iceland, partially preserved
- Þórsdrápa ‒ deeds of the god Thor, two partially preserved poems by Eilífr Goðrúnarson and Eysteinn Valdason
- Ynglingatal ‒ on the mythological and legendary history of the Ynglings, presented as ancestors of the Norwegian kings, by Þjóðólfr of Hvinir
- Háleygjatal ‒ a similar work on the Hlaðir dynasty, by Eyvindr skáldaspillir

To these could be added two poems relating the death of a king and his reception in Valhalla:

- Eiríksmál ‒ on the death of King Eric Bloodaxe, by an unknown skald
- Hákonarmál ‒ on the death of King Hákon the Good, by Eyvindr skáldaspillir

Some extended works were composed as circumstance pieces, such as the following by Egill Skallagrímsson:

- Sonatorrek ‒ a lament on the deaths of his sons
- Höfuðlausn ‒ in praise of Eric Bloodaxe, his enemy, to ransom his head
- Arinbjarnarkviða ‒ in praise of his friend Arinbjörn

== History ==
The origin story for poetry comes from a myth by Snorri Sturluson. The story depicts poetry as a liquid that takes various forms. The point of this is to show that poetry has gone through and will continue to go through change. The dróttkvætt metre appears to have been an innovation associated with a new fashion in formally more elaborate poetry associated with named poets. The metre has been compared to Irish and Latin poetic forms, which may have influenced its development. Origins in magic have also been suggested, because of the existence of skaldic curses (such as Egill Skallagrímsson's on King Eric Bloodaxe) and because there are 10th-century magical inscriptions on runestones in the metre. Since the first example of skaldic poetry of which we know is Bragi Boddason's Ragnarsdrápa from the early 9th century, some have argued that he and his associates invented it, but his work is already highly accomplished, suggesting that this style of poetry had been developing for some time. Bragi (whom many scholars consider was deified as the god Bragi) was a Norwegian, and skaldic poetry is thought to have originated in either Norway or the Scandinavian Baltic.

Most of the skalds of whom we know spent all or part of their careers as court poets, either those of kings, particularly the kings of Norway, or those of jarls, particularly the Hlaðir jarls, a dynasty based in what is now Trøndelag some of whose members ruled all or part of Norway as heathens in alternation with the Christian converters King Olaf Tryggvason and King Olaf Haraldsson (Saint Olaf). They produced praise poetry telling of their patrons' deeds, which became an orally transmitted record and was subsequently cited in history sagas. One example of this is the Heimskringla by Snorri Sturlson. A third of the book focuses on Olaf II Haraldsson. Their accuracy has been the subject of debate, but the verse form guards against corruption and the skalds traditionally criticized as well as advised their patrons. Skalds at the court at Hlaðir have been credited with developing the Valhalla complex and the cult of Odin as an aristocratic, educated form of heathenism influenced by Christian eschatology. Poetic ability was highly valued; the art was practised by the Norwegian kings themselves, and several skalds, such as Egill Skallagrímsson, are the subject of their own biographical sagas.

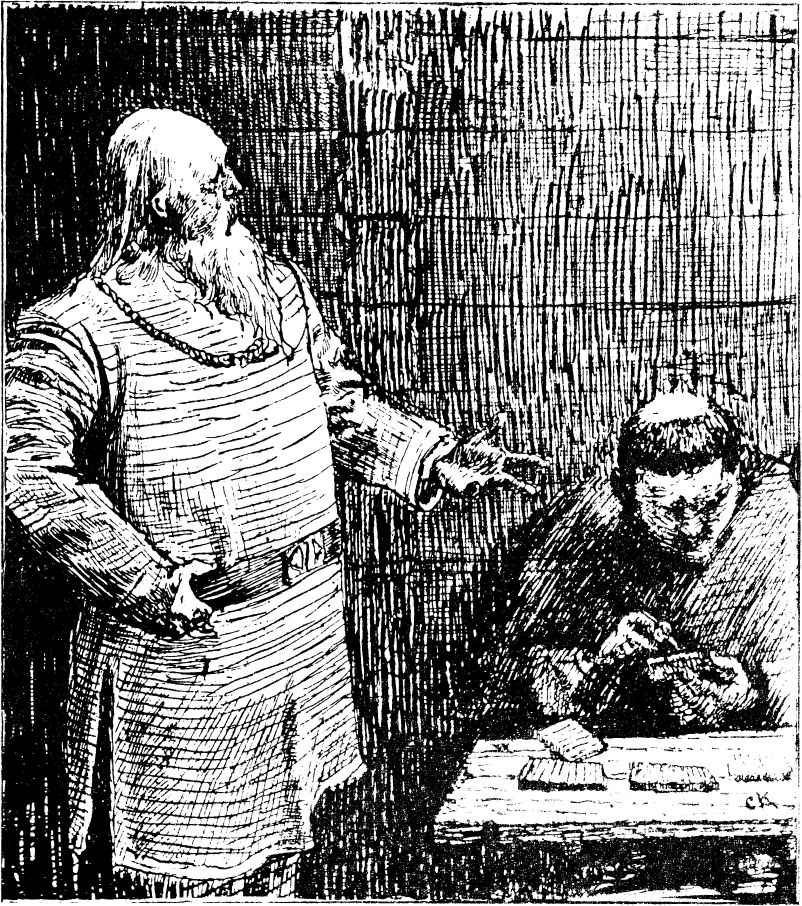
Snorri Sturluson, illustration by Christian Krohg (1899)

Icelandic skalds came to dominate at Norwegian courts; the last prominent Norwegian skald was Eyvindr skáldaspillir, and from the second half of the 10th century, all known court skalds were from Iceland or the Orkney Islands. By the end of the 10th century, skaldic poetry had become increasingly internally complex, and in the 11th century Christian skalds reacted against this complexity by using far fewer kennings, especially avoiding those referencing heathen deities. In the 12th century, a century after the conversion of Iceland, some skalds reintroduced heathen kennings as literary formulae, interest in ancient tradition was revived, and drápur were produced on historical figures, such as Einarr Skúlason's Geisli on Olaf Tryggvason, composed 150 years after his death. Skalds experimented with new metres, notably hrynhent, which uses longer lines than dróttkvætt and was probably influenced by Latin metres. This metre arose in the 10th century and was popularized in the 11th by Arnórr jarlaskáld, whose Hrynhenda (c. 1045} is about King Magnus the Good; in the 12th century it was the dominant metre of religious skaldic poetry.

Despite these adaptations, the skaldic tradition itself was endangered by the popularity of newer and simpler forms of poetry and loss of knowledge of the kenning tradition. Snorri Sturluson's Prose Edda, a handbook produced around 1220 that includes a guide to the metres, an explanation of kennings and their mythological and heroic bases grounded in contemporary learning, and numerous examples that preserve many skaldic verses, enabled skaldic poetry to continue in Iceland after the tradition of court poetry ended in the 13th century.

Christian religious poetry became an increasingly important part of the skaldic tradition beginning in the 12th century. Eysteinn Ásgrímsson's Lilja was particularly influential: it uses the hrynhent metre and almost no kennings, and was much imitated. Christian skaldic poetry died out in Iceland only with the Protestant Reformation of the 16th century, although that produced after 1400 is rarely studied as part of the skaldic corpus.

=== Notable skalds ===
More than 300 skalds are known from the period between 800 and 1200 AD. Many are listed in the Skáldatal, a list of court skalds by the ruler they served that runs from the legendary Ragnar Lodbrok to the late 13th century and includes some poets from whom no verses are preserved. Notable names include:

- Bragi Boddason "the Old", early 9th century
- Þorbjörn Hornklofi, 9th century, court poet of King Harald Fairhair
- Þjóðólfr of Hvinir, active c. 900
- Eyvindr skáldaspillir, 10th century
- Egill Skallagrímsson, first half of the 10th century, protagonist of Egils saga
- Kormákr Ögmundarson, mid-10th century, protagonist of Kormáks saga
- Eilífr Goðrúnarson, late 10th century
- Þórvaldr Hjaltason, 10th century, a skald of King Eric the Victorious
- Hallfreðr vandræðaskáld, late 10th century, court poet of King Olaf Tryggvason
- Einarr Helgason "skálaglamm", late 10th century
- Úlfr Uggason, late 10th century
- Tindr Hallkelsson, active c. 1000, one of Jarl Hákon Sigurðarson's court poets
- Gunnlaugr Ormstunga, 10th–11th century, nicknamed "Wormtongue" on account of his propensity for satire and invective
- Sigvatr Þórðarson, first half of the 11th century, court poet to King Olaf Haraldsson (Saint Olaf)
- Þórarinn loftunga, first half of the 11th century, a court poet to Sveinn Knútsson
- Óttarr svarti, first half of the 11th century, a skald at the court of King Olof Skötkonung and King Olaf Haraldsson
- Valgarðr á Velli, mid-11th century, court poet to King Harald Hardrada
- Þjóðólfr Arnórsson, mid-11th century, court poet to King Magnus the Good and King Harald Hardrada
- Arnórr jarlaskáld, mid-11th century, court poet to the Jarls of Orkney and several Norwegian kings
- Einarr Skúlason, 12th century
- Eysteinn Ásgrímsson, mid-14th century, monk who adapted skaldic tradition to high medieval Christianity

Many lausavísur attributed in sagas to women have traditionally been regarded as inauthentic, and few female skalds are known by name. They include:

- Hildr Hrólfsdóttir, 9th century
- Jórunn skáldmær, first half of the 10th century
- Steinunn Refsdóttir, late 10th century
- Steinvör Sighvatsdóttir, 13th century

== Editions ==
The first comprehensive edition of skaldic poetry, by Finnur Jónsson, was Den norsk-islandske skjaldedigtning, published in 4 volumes in Copenhagen in 1908–15 (2 volumes each diplomatic and corrected text; with Danish translations). Later editions include Ernst A. Kock's Den norsk-isländska Skaldedigtningen, published in two volumes in Lund in 1946–50, and Magnus Olsen's Edda- og Skaldekvad: forarbeider til kommentar, published in seven volumes in Oslo in 1960–64 (analysis in Norwegian). In the early 21st century, the Skaldic Poetry of the Scandinavian Middle Ages project has prepared a new edition with associated database online; five of a projected nine volumes had been published as of 2018. This edition groups the poems according to the type of prose source in which they are preserved.

== In popular culture ==
- Polish rock group Skaldowie (literally The Skalds), which debuted in 1965, takes its name form the skalds.
- Skaldic Poetry of the Scandinavian Middle Ages released in 2007.
- Norwegian folk group Wardruna released in 2018 an album titled Skald, which included a track by the same name.
- French neofolk group Skáld borrowed its name from the skalds.

== See also ==
- Ashik
- Old Norse Women's Poetry: The Voices of Female Skalds
- Bard
- Bhāts
- Dziady (wandering beggars)
- Filí
- Griot
- Gusans
- Lirnyk
- Mansöngr
- Minstrels
- Rhapsodist
- Troubadour
