= Kings' sagas =

Old Norse sagas

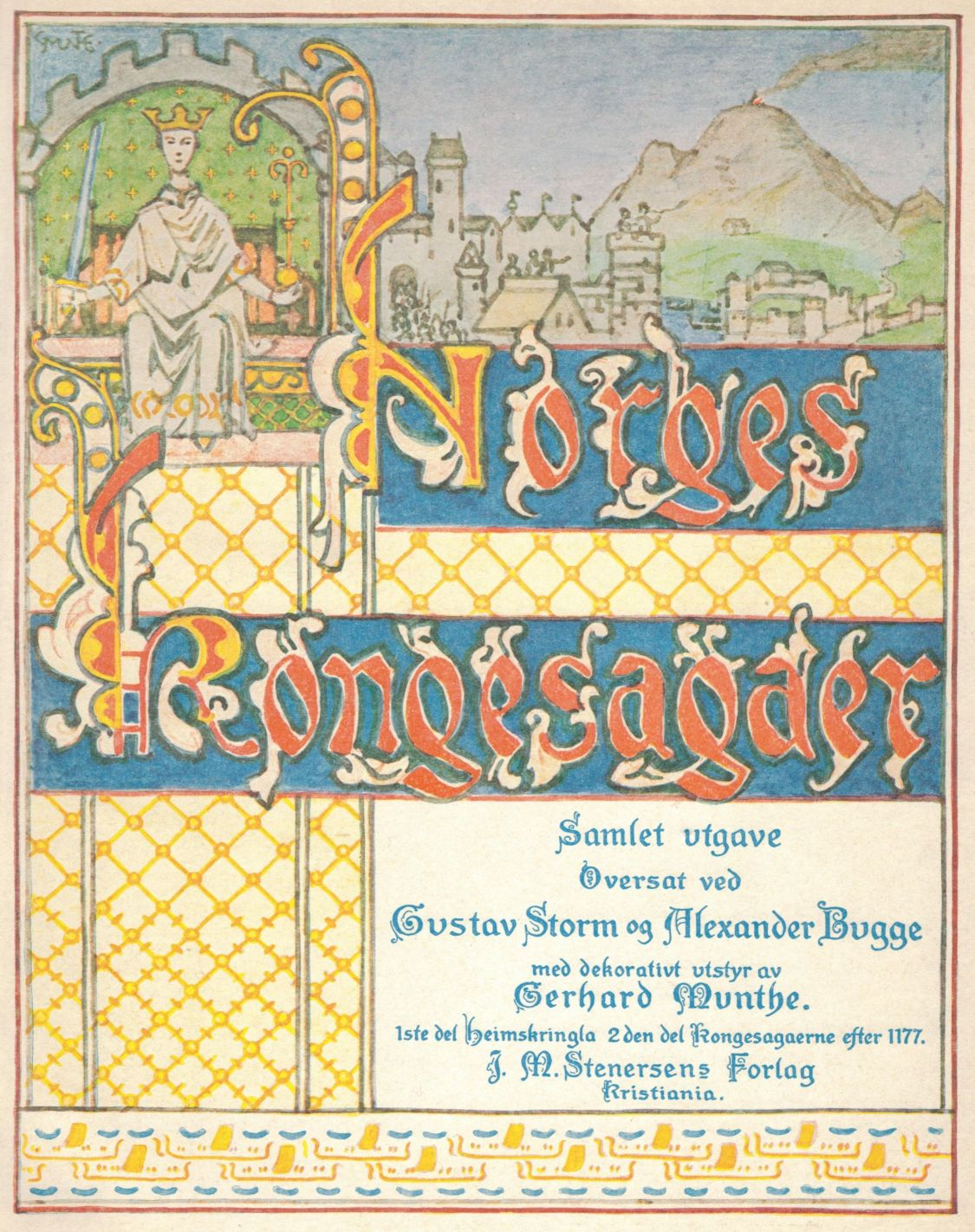
Norges Kongesagaer Edited by Gustav Storm and Alexander Bugge Illustrated by Gerhard Munthe (1914)

Kings' sagas (Icelandic: konungasögur, Nynorsk: kongesoger, -sogor, Bokmål: kongesagaer) are Old Norse sagas which principally tell of the lives of semi-legendary and legendary (mythological, fictional) Nordic kings, also known as saga kings. They were composed during the twelfth through the fourteenth centuries, primarily in Iceland, but with some written in Norway.

Kings' sagas frequently contain episodic stories known in scholarship as þættir, such as the Íslendingaþættir (about Icelanders), Styrbjarnar þáttr Svíakappa, Hróa þáttr heimska, and Eymundar þáttr hrings (about people from elsewhere).

== List of Kings' sagas ==
Including works in Latin, and in approximate order of composition (though many dates could be off by decades)

- A Latin work by Sæmundr fróði, c. 1120, lost.
- The older version of Íslendingabók by Ari fróði, c. 1125, lost.
- Hryggjarstykki by Eiríkr Oddsson, c. 1150, lost.
- Historia Norvegiæ, c. 1170.
- Historia de Antiquitate Regum Norwagiensium by Theodoricus monachus, c. 1180.
- Skjöldunga saga, c. 1180, badly preserved.
- Oldest Saga of St. Olaf, c. 1190, mostly lost.
- Ágrip af Nóregskonungasögum, c. 1190.
- A Latin Óláfs saga Tryggvasonar by Oddr Snorrason, c. 1190, survives in translation.
- A Latin Óláfs saga Tryggvasonar by Gunnlaugr Leifsson, c. 1195, lost.
- Sverris saga, by Karl Jónsson, c. 1205.
- Legendary Saga of St. Olaf, c. 1210.
- Morkinskinna, c. 1220 but before Fagrskinna.
- Fagrskinna, c. 1220.
- Óláfs saga helga by Styrmir Kárason, c. 1220, mostly lost.
- Böglunga sögur, c. 1225.
- Separate Saga of St. Olaf, by Snorri Sturluson, c. 1225.
- Heimskringla by Snorri Sturluson, c. 1230.
- Knýtlinga saga, probably by Ólafr Þórðarson, c. 1260.
- Hákonar saga Hákonarsonar, by Sturla Þórðarson, c. 1265.
- Magnúss saga lagabœtis, by Sturla Þórðarson, c. 1280, only fragments survive.
- Hulda-Hrokkinskinna, c. 1280.
- Óláfs saga Tryggvasonar en mesta, c. 1300.

== Sometimes counted among the Kings' sagas ==
- Jómsvíkinga saga
- Orkneyinga saga
- Færeyinga saga
- Brjáns saga

== Editions and translations ==
In Norwegian

- Storm, Gustav; Bugge, Alexander (ed. & tr.) Norges Kongesagaer (Christiania: I. M. Stenersen's Publishing, 1914)
- Munch, Peter Andreas; Þórðarson, Sturla Norges Konge-Sagaer Fra De Aeldste Tider Indtil Anden Halvdeel Af De 13 De Århundrede Efter Christi Fødsel (Nabu Press. 2010 ) ISBN 978-1142083908

== Other sources ==
- Ciklamini, Marlene Snorri Sturluson (Boston: Twayne Publishers, 1978) ISBN 0805763341
- Hermannsson, Halldó Bibliography of the sagas of the kings of Norway and related sagas and tales (BiblioBazaar. 2009) ISBN 978-1113624611
- Jakobsson, Ármann; McTurk, Rory (ed.) A Companion to Old Norse-Icelandic Literature and Culture (Blackwell Publishing, 2004) ISBN 9780631235026
- Thorsson, Örnólfur (ed.) The Sagas of the Icelanders: A Selection (Penguin Putnam. 2000) ISBN 0-14-100003-1
- Whaley, Diana Heimskringla: An Introduction (Viking Society for Northern Research Text, 1991) ISBN 978-0903521239
- Wolf, Kirsten The Legends of the Saints in Old Norse-Icelandic Prose (University of Toronto Press. 2013) ISBN 978-1442646216
