= Þorgerðr Hölgabrúðr and Irpa =

Divine figures in Norse mythology

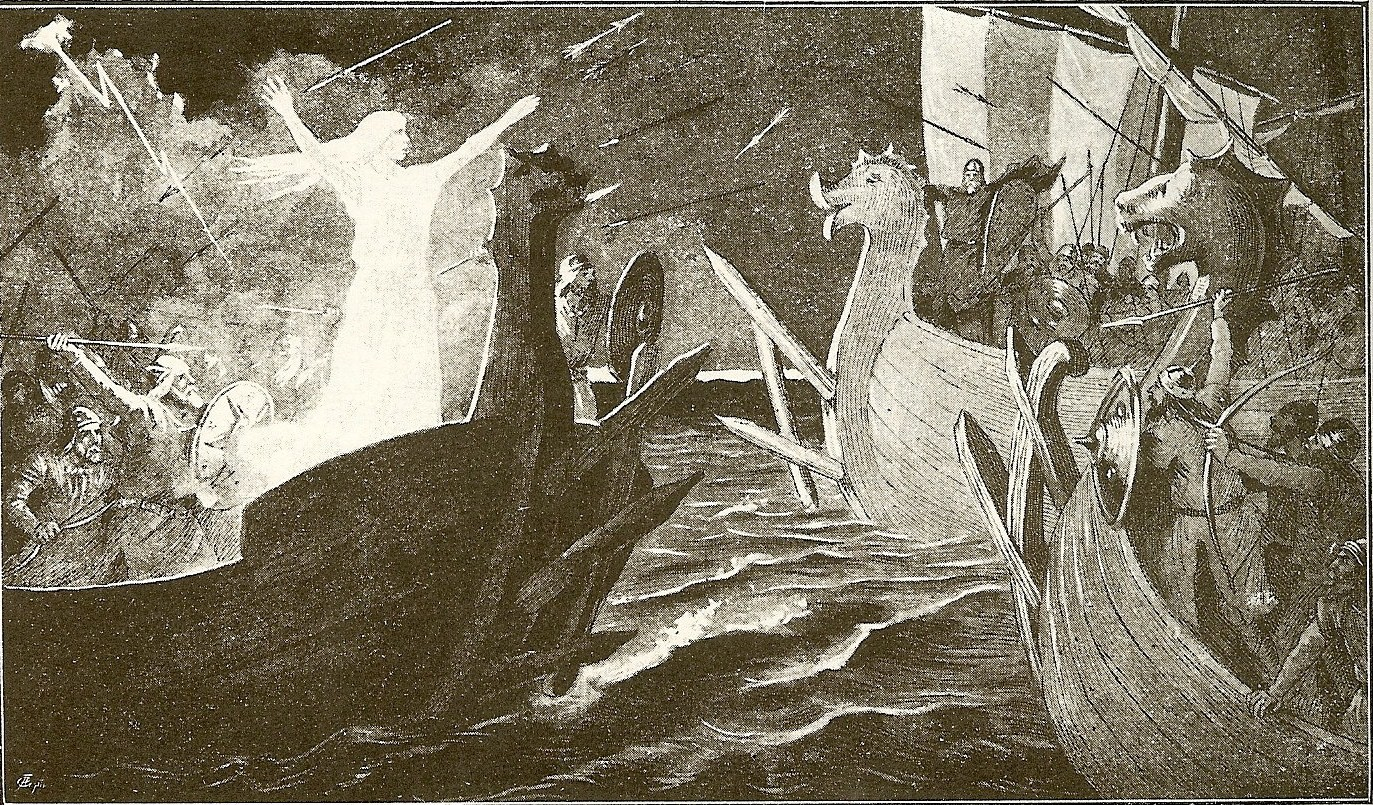
An illustration depicting Þorgerðr Hölgabrúðr facing the fleet of the Jomsvikings (1895) by Jenny Nyström.

Þorgerðr Hölgabrúðr (Thorgerdr Holgabrudr) and Irpa are divine figures in Norse mythology. They appear together in Jómsvíkinga saga, Njáls saga, and Þorleifs þáttr jarlsskálds. Irpa's name does not appear outside of these four attestations, but Þorgerðr also appears in the Prose Edda book Skáldskaparmál, Færeyinga saga, and Harðar saga ok Hólmverja and is mentioned in Ketils saga hœngs.

Þorgerðr Hölgabrúðr is particularly associated with Haakon Sigurdsson (d. 995), and, in Jómsvíkinga saga and Þorleifs þáttr jarlsskálds, Þorgerðr and Irpa are described as sisters. The roles of the Þorgerðr Hölgabrúðr and Irpa in these sources and the implications of their names has been the topic of some scholarly discourse and conjecture.

== Etymology ==
The name Þorgerðr Hölgabrúðr (or Hǫlgabrúðr) is Old Norse and literally means "Þorgerðr, Hölgi's bride". According to Skáldskaparmál chapter 42, Hölgi (a traditional eponym of the northernmost Norwegian province Hålogaland) is also Þorgerðr's father. The first name Þorgerðr is a compound of two names: the god name Þor (Thor) and gerðr – the latter name meaning "fenced in".

The figure's second name sometimes appears in sources featuring -brúðr replaced with -troll, and, in place of Hölg-, the prefixes Hörða-, Hörga-, and Hölda- also appear. It has been suggested that name Þorgerðr derives from the name of the jötunn Gerðr, as Þorgerðr is also described at times as a troll or giantess. Alternatively, Gerðr may simply be an abbreviated version of the name Þorgerðr. Þorgerðr is referred to as Gerðr in Tindr Hallkelsson's 10th century drápa on Haakon, quoted in chapter 43 of Óláfs saga Tryggvasonar, found in the Heimskringla.

John McKinnell states that the name of Þorgerðr's father is probably a later addition used to explain the origins of the name of Hålogaland, and that "Hölgabrúðr" probably means "bride of the (rulers of) Hålogaland" and that Hörðabrúðr, similarly, may mean "bride of the (rulers of) Hörðaland". Hörgabrúðr as "bride of the heathen shrines", and höldabrúðr as either "bride of the people of Holde" or "bride of noblemen". McKinnell says that the variety of stories and names suggest that the tradition of Þorgerðr Hölgabrúðr was wide spread, and that she was venerated in more than one area.

The name Irpa may derive from the Old Norse term jarpr "dark brown", which has led to a number of theories about the goddess. Jarpr is derived from the earlier Proto-Germanic word *erpaz.

== Attestations ==
Þorgerðr and/or Irpa are attested in the following works:

=== Jómsvíkinga saga ===
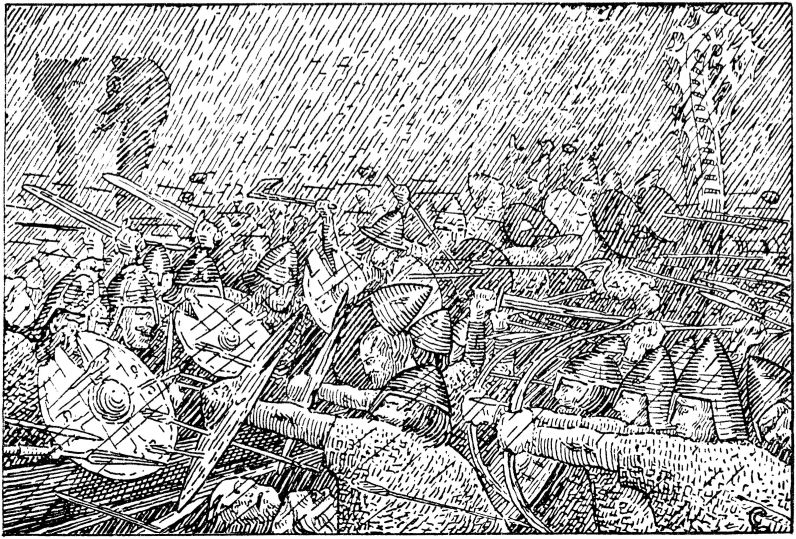
Clouds cover the sky, daylight becomes sparse, thunder and lightning ring out, and it begins to rain in an illustration of Jómsvíkinga saga (1897) by Halfdan Egedius.

Irpa appears in chapter 21 of the Jómsvíkinga saga, which focuses on the late 10th century Battle of Hjörungavágr between the fleet of the Jomsvikings under Sigvaldi Strut-Haraldsson and the fleet of Haakon Sigurdsson and Sweyn Haakonsson. Haakon calls a meeting during a lull in the fighting, and says that he feels that the tide of the battle is going against his allies and him. Haakon then goes to an island called Primsigned, north of Hjórunga Bay. On the island, Haakon falls to his knees, and, while looking northward, prays to what is described as his patron goddess, Þorgerðr Hölgabrúðr. According to the saga, Þorgerðr repeatedly refuses his offers, but finally accepts the blót of his 7-year-old son. Haakon's slave, Skopti, slaughters the boy. Haakon returns to his fleet and presses his men to engage in an attack, and commends his men to ("Þorgerðr" is here anglicized as "Thorgerd"):

Press the attack all the more vigorously, because I have invoked for victory both the sisters, Thorgerd and Irpa.

Haakon enters his ship, the fleet rows forward for the attack, and battle ensues. The weather becomes thick in the north, the clouds cover the sky, daylight becomes sparse, thunder and lightning ring out, and it begins to rain. The Jomvikings fleet fights facing the storm and cold, and they have trouble standing due to the heavy wind. The Jomsvikings throw weapons, missiles, and stones at Haakon's fleet but the winds turn their projectiles back at them.

Hávard the Hewing, in the fleet of Haakon, first spots Þorgerðr there and then many others see her. The wind wanes and the men witness arrows flying from the fingertips of Þorgerðr, each arrow killing a man of the Jomsviking fleet. The Jomsvikings tell Sigvaldi that although they are no longer fighting men alone, they will still do their best. The storm lessens again and once again Haakon invokes Þorgerðr. The saga describes this attack:

And then it grew dark again with a squall, this time even stronger and worse than before. And right at the beginning of the squall Hávard the Hewing saw that two women were standing on the earl's ship, and both were doing the same thing that Thorgerd had done before.

Sigvaldi tells his men to retreat, and reasons that this is not what he vowed to fight, especially since there are now two women, whom he refers to as "ogresses" and "trolls". After the Jomvikings' fleet has been defeated, Haakon's men weigh the hailstones that had fallen during the storm, to detect "what power" Þorgerðr and Irpa had, and they find that the hailstones weigh an ounce each.

=== Njáls saga ===
Þorgerðr and Irpa are again mentioned together in chapter 87 of Njáls saga, set in the 10th and 11th centuries. Here, Hrapp breaks into the temple owned by Haakon and Gudbrand while Haakon is at a feast at Gudbrand's home. Hrapp plunders a seated depiction of Þorgerðr; he takes a large gold ring from her plus the linen hood she is wearing. Next, Hrapp spots a depiction of Thor and Thor's wain. He takes a gold ring from the depiction of Thor too, and, thirdly, he takes a ring from a depiction of Irpa there. Hrapp takes all of the images from the temple, strips them of their items, and then burns the temple until leaving at dawn.

=== Skáldskaparmál ===
Þorgerðr is mentioned in the Prose Edda book Skáldskaparmál. Here, Hålogaland is described as named after king Hölgi, and that he was Þorgerðr's father. According to Skáldskaparmál, blót were made to them both that included money, and a tumulus was made for Hölgi that was built with layers of gold and silver, then covered by a layer of earth and stone. Later in Skáldskaparmál, a list of "troll-wives" is given that includes Hölgabrúðr.

=== Færeyinga Saga ===
In chapter 23 of Færeyinga Saga, Haakon asks Sigmund where he puts his trust. Sigmund responds that he puts his trust nowhere but with himself. Haakon responds:

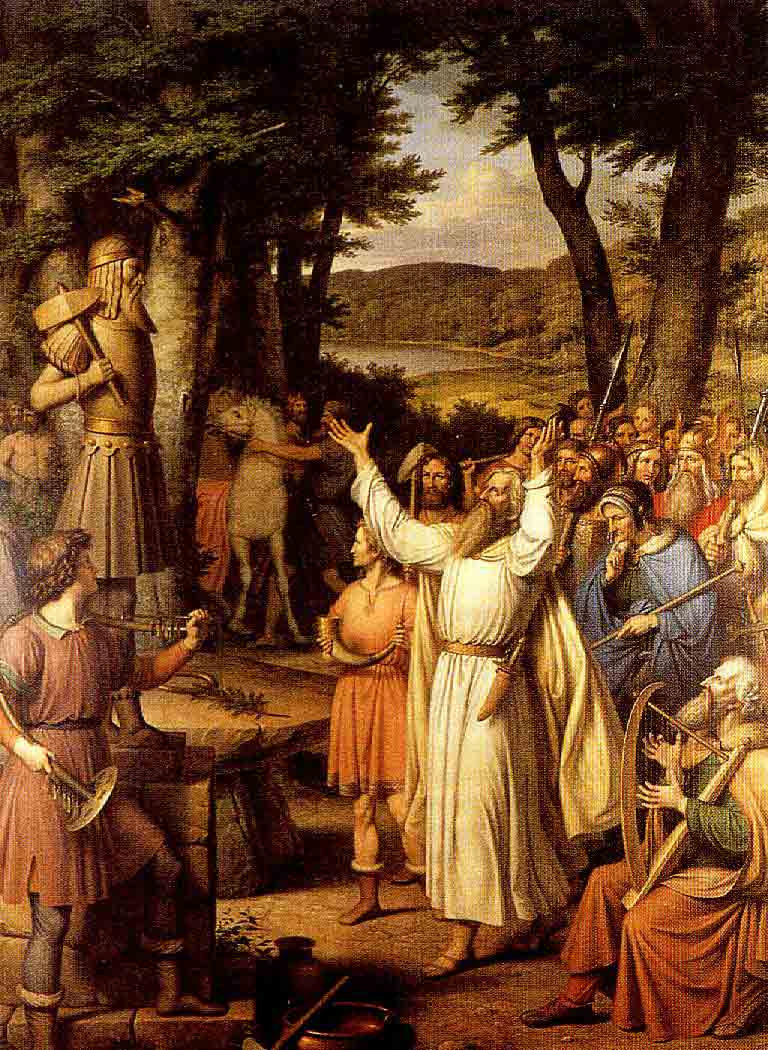
"Offering" by J. L. Lund, depicting a sacrifice to an image of Thor.

"That must not be," the Earl [Haakon] answered, "but thou shalt put thy trust where I have put all my trust, namely, in Thorgerd Shinebright," said he. "And we will go and see her now and seek luck for thee at her hands."

The two then follow a small path through the woods until they come to a house with a stake fence around it. The house is described as beautiful, featuring carvings filled with gold and silver. They enter the house with a few men, and find that it is lit from glass windows in the ceiling, so that the daylight illuminates the room and there are no shadows to be seen due to this. There were depictions of many gods there and a woman who is described as well dressed near the door.

The saga relates that Haakon throws himself to the ground before the woman for some time. When he gets up, he tells Sigmund that they should give her an offering, that they ought to lay silver on the stool before her. Haakon says:

And we shall have it as a mark of what she thinks of this, if she will do as I wish and let the ring loose which holds in her hand. For thou, Sigmund, shalt get luck by that ring.

Haakon takes hold of the ring, and, seemingly to Sigmund, she clasps her hand around it. Haakon does not receive the ring. Haakon casts himself down before her a second time, and Sigmund notices that Haakon is weeping. He stands up again, takes hold of the ring, and finds that it has become loose. Haakon gives the ring to Sigmund, and tells him that he must never part with it. Sigmund gives him his word on it and the men part, each returning to their ships. A storm appears and the two ships are swept apart, and many days are described as passing afterwards.

=== Harðar saga ok Hólmverja ===
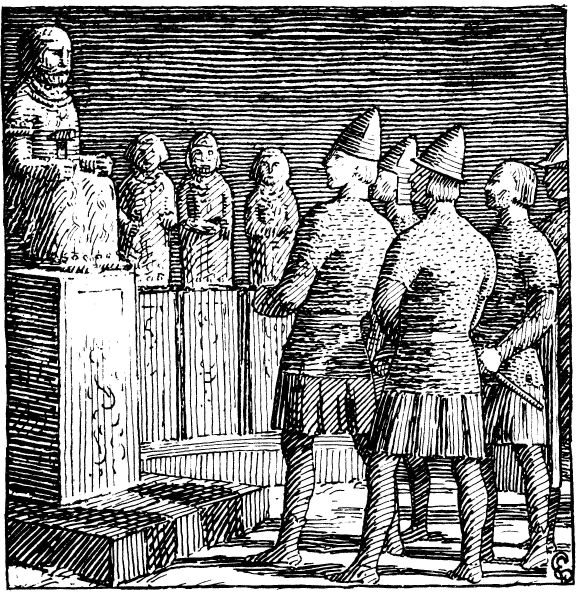
"King Olaf in Thor's hof" (1897), illustration from Óláfs saga Tryggvasonar by Halfdan Egedius.

In chapter 19 of the saga Harðar saga ok Hólmverja, Grímkell Bjarnarson, a goði closely related to Haakon, goes to the temple (Old Norse hof) of Þorgerðr Hörgabrúðr to ask for a successful marriage for his daughter. When he arrives, the gods are preparing to leave. After an angry exchange with Þorgerðr, who tells him he does not have long to live, Grímkell burns down the hof with all the gods in it. Later that evening, Grímkell suddenly falls dead at dinner.

=== Ketils saga hœngs ===
In chapter 5 of Ketils saga hœngs, Ketill encounters a troll-woman in the forest. The troll-woman tells him she is traveling to a trolla-þing—an assembly of trolls. Among the major figures who will be present, she continues, are Skelkingr, the king of the trolls, and Þorgerðr Hörgatröll.

=== Þorleifs þáttr jarlsskálds ===
In Þorleifs þáttr jarlsskálds, Þorleifr Ásgeirsson, known as jarlsskáld ("the Jarl's skald"), recites an abusive and magically aggressive poem in Earl Haakon's hall. In chapter 7 (chapter 173 of Óláfs saga Tryggvasonar), Haakon recovers from his injuries and offers gifts to Þorgerðr Hördabrúðr and her sister Irpa, seeking their counsel on how best to take vengeance on Þorleifr. Following their advice, Haakon has a wooden man (Old Norse trémaðr) built out of driftwood and endows it with a human heart. Haakon and the two sisters then bring the trémaðr to life, arm him with a halberd, and send him to Iceland to kill Þorleifr, which he does.

== Theories ==
A number of theories surround the figures of Þorgerðr and Irpa:

=== Guardian goddesses ===
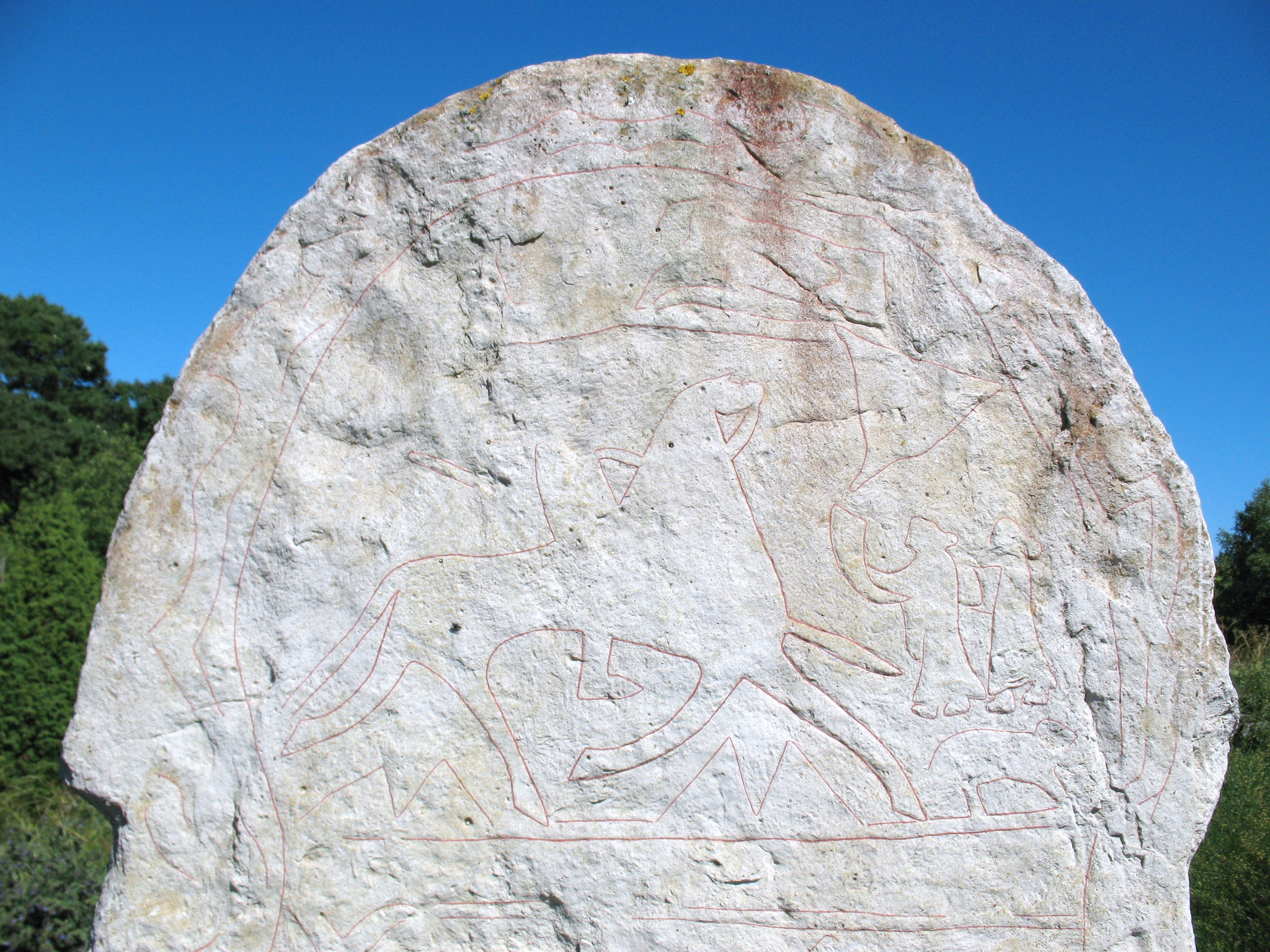
The Stenbro picture stone on Gotland is one of several image stones that depict a dead man being received by a valkyrie in the afterlife.

Hilda Ellis Davidson counts Þorgerðr and Irpa as examples of guardian goddesses in Germanic paganism, and compares their roles to that of the dísir and valkyries. Davidson says that if Helgi is the mythical founder of Hålogaland, it would explain Þorgerðr's last name ("bride of Helgi") and that, subsequently, she would be the wife of each ruler of the kingdom in turn. Substantially the same argument has been advanced by McKinnell. Davidson compares this role to accounts of kings or leaders being granted entry into Valhalla in the Viking Age, that the idea of a guardian goddess welcoming kings was essentially an aristocratic concept, and that a tradition such as this could explain noble valkyries welcoming dead kings into the after life, using the poem Hákonarmál as an example.

=== Þorgerðr and Freyja ===
Davidson further theorizes that Þorgerðr's name may have originally been Gerðr, reasons that this form is what is found in early skaldic verse, and, further, that this is one of the names given for the goddess Freyja. Davidson points out that Haakon may have later turned to the same goddess soon before he met his death, when he hid in the earth beneath a swine in Óláfs saga Tryggvasonar (collected in Heimskringla) chapter 48, and that this could symbolize a mound of Freyja, one of whose names means "sow" (Old Norse sýr). Davidson theorizes that the account of Olaf I of Norway dragging Þorgerðr's image out of its temple after Haakon's death, and burning it next to a depiction of Freyr (Freyja's male twin), further supports this view.

=== Irpa ===
Irpa has been proposed as an earth goddess due to the derivation of her name to a word for "dark brown", but F.R. Schröder has expressed criticism at the notion of concluding that Irpa is an earth goddess based on this evidence. John McKinnell proposes that the Irpa may represent a "dark" aspect of Þorgerðr, in that her name may mean "swarthy", and that the two were probably of contrasting appearance; Irpa being unlucky to name and seen as a troll. McKinnell further proposes a connection between Irpa and Hel, stating that the two may have been seen as synonymous.

=== Miscellaneous theories ===
Nora Chadwick (1950) suggested that mythical legends of Þorgerðr and Irpa have become confused and intertwined with historical accounts of Haakon's wife Þóra and her sister, Guðrún; and that the figure of the shieldmaiden Lagertha in the Gesta may also be an aspect of Þorgerðr. Lotte Motz (1993) proposed that Þorgerðr was a rare instance of a giantess who was the recipient of cultic worship in her own right in heathen Scandinavia.
