= Ottar Jarl =

Jarl Ottar or Ottar Jarl (?-970s) was a jarl of Götaland who appears in the Heimskringla (the Saga of Olaf Tryggvasson) and in the Jomsvikinga Saga.

The Jomsvikinga Saga tells that Ottar was the maternal grandfather of Palnetoke, the Jomsviking.

In the Heimskringla, Snorri Sturluson relates that Haakon Sigurdsson killed Jarl Ottar during an attack on Götaland for Harald Bluetooth.
