= Tindr Hallkelsson =

Tindr Hallkelsson (Old Norse: [ˈtindz̠ ˈhɑlːˌkelsˌson]; Modern Icelandic: Tindur Hallkelsson [ˈtʰɪntʏr ˈhatl̥ˌcʰɛlsˌsɔːn]) was an Icelandic skald active around the year 1000. He was the court poet of earl Hákon Sigurðarson and fragments of his drápa on the earl are preserved in Jómsvíkinga saga, the kings' sagas (especially Snorri Sturluson's Saga of Óláfr Tryggvason in Heimskringla) and the Prose Edda. One strophe from the poem, relating to the battle of Hjörungavágr, is quoted in all those sources. The following is its occurrence and context in Heimskringla taken from the 1844 translation by Samuel Laing. In Laing's time skaldic poetry was poorly understood and he translated it very freely:

Then the fleets came together, and one of the sharpest of conflicts began. Many fell on both sides, but the most by far on Hakon's side; for the Jomsborg vikings fought desperately, sharply, and murderously, and shot right through the shields. So many spears were thrown against Earl Hakon that his armour was altogether split asunder, and he threw it off. So says Tind Halkelson: --

"The ring-linked coat of strongest mail
Could not withstand the iron hail,
Though sewed with care and elbow bent,
By Norn, on its strength intent.
The fire of battle raged around, --
Odin's steel shirt flew all unbound!
The earl his ring-mail from him flung,
Its steel rings on the wet deck rung;
Part of it fell into the sea, --
A part was kept, a proof to be
How sharp and thick the arrow-flight
Among the sea-steeds in this fight."

Tindr has a role in Heiðarvíga saga where two lausavísur attributed to him are preserved. He also has a minor role in Harðar saga.
