= Jomsborg =

Semi-legendary Viking stronghold

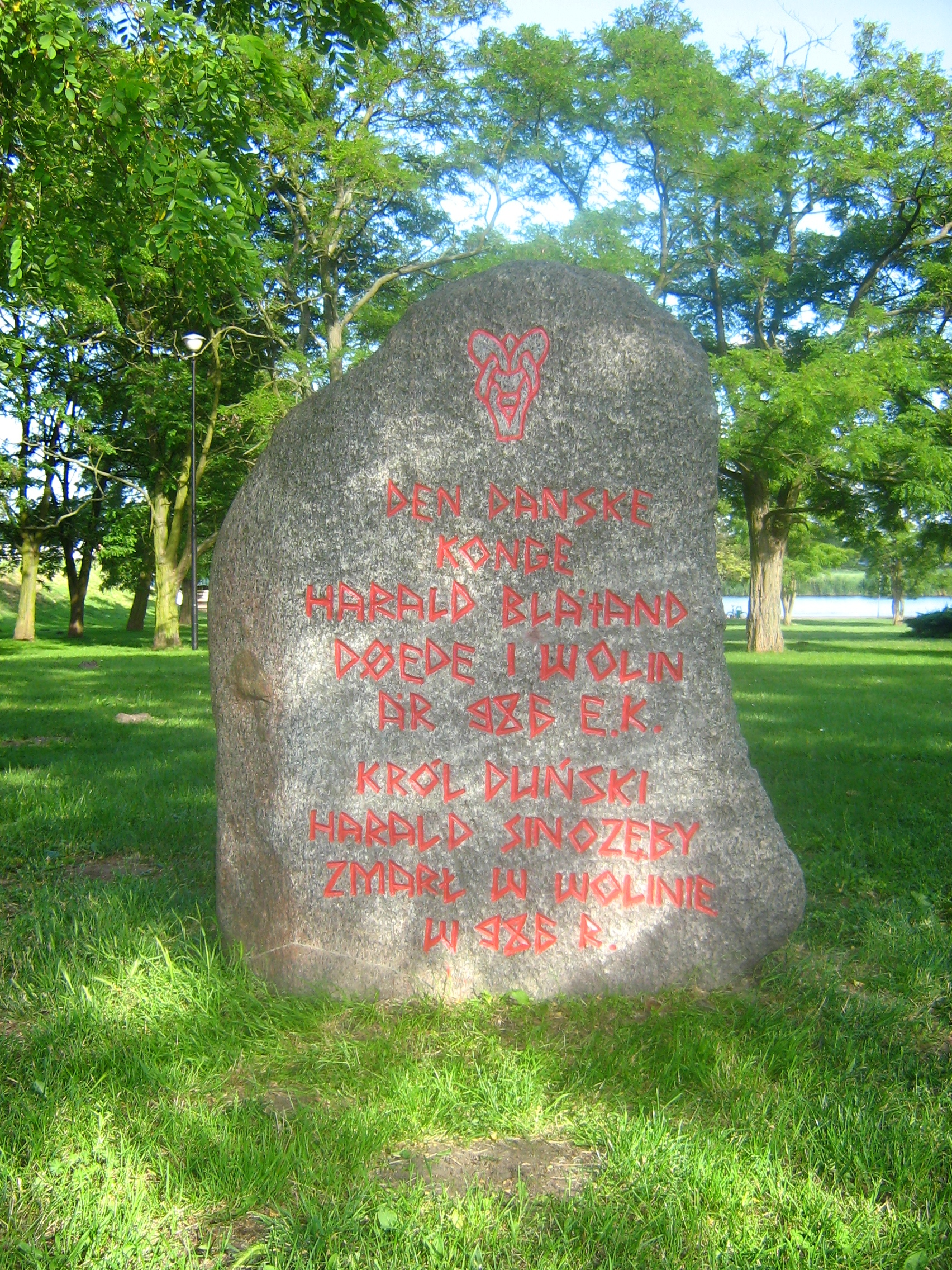
Modern memorial in Wolin, often regarded as a probable site of medieval Jomsborg. The Danish and Polish inscription, held in rune style, commemorates the death of Harald Bluetooth in Jómsborg, 986 (according to inscription).

Jomsborg or Jómsborg was a semi-legendary Viking stronghold at the southern coast of the Baltic Sea (medieval Wendland, modern Pomerania), that existed between the 960s and 1043. Its inhabitants were known as Jomsvikings. Jomsborg's exact location, or its existence, has not yet been established, though it is often maintained that Jomsborg was located on the eastern outlet of the Oder river. Historian Lauritz Weibull dismissed Jomsborg as a legend.

The only source that mentions a precise location of Jomsborg (53°51′50″N 14°43′05″E) is the controversial Gesta Wulinensis ecclesiae pontificum that is said to have been discovered in the autumn of 2019.

== Location ==
Jomsborg is often thought to be identical with the present-day town of Wolin (also Wollin) on the southeastern tip of the isle of Wolin in northwestern Poland, probably located at Srebrna Góra hill north of the town. In the Early Middle Ages, modern Wolin was the site of a multi-ethnic emporium (then known as Jumne or Julin). The Nordic sagas use "Jómsborg" exclusively, while medieval German histories use "Jumne" or "Julin", with the alternate names, some of which may be spelling variants, "vimne", "uimne", "Jumneta", "Juminem", "Julinum", "uineta", "Vineta" and "Vinneta".

In 1931/32, Pomeranian historian Adolf Hofmeister (1883-1956) suggested, through comparison of the events reported by the different chronicles, that all these terms describe the same place, which is at or near the modern town of Wolin. However, this is by no means universally accepted; professor and historian Steven Fanning writes: "The Trelleborg-type fortresses of Denmark have been taken to be actual examples of Jómsborg-style camps of such warriors and Wolin in Poland was believed to be the actual Jómsborg. However, all such attempts to locate Jómsborg or encampments of the Jómvikings have failed, leading many to doubt that Jómvikings ever existed outside of literature." According to Władysław Filipowiak there are several dated sources which attest to the presence of a company of armed Vikings at the end of the 10th century in Wolin, who may have been installed there as mercenaries by the Polish king Bolesław the Brave. Ruins discovered in Wolin in 2023 are being investigated as a possible site of Jomsborg.

Other theories see Jomsborg in the northwest of nearby Usedom island, on lands now submerged. The small islands in this area are remnants of a long stretch of land between Usedom and Rügen, which fell victim to storm floods in the early 14th century. Suspected locations in this area are the Veritas grounds between the petty islands of Ruden and Greifswalder Oie, and the Peenemünde shoals. While Viking Age jewelry has been found at the site, archaeological evaluation of these theories has not yet been possible.

== Fortress ==
According to the Knytlingasaga and Fagrskinna, Jomsborg was built by the Danish king Harold Bluetooth (910-985/86) in the 960s. The Jomsvikinga Saga mentions Danish Viking Palnatoki as its founder.

In medieval records, Jomsborg is described as a fortress with a harbour. The harbour was overseen by a stone tower mounted with catapults, built on an arch spanning over the harbour entrance which could be closed by an iron gate. According to the oldest records, the harbour had space for three ships; later records give a capacity of up to 360 ships.

According to the Heimskringla, Jomsborg was destroyed in 1043 by Dano-Norwegian king Magnus the Good. The fortress was burned down, and many of the inhabitants were killed.

== Jomsvikings ==
The Jomsborg Vikings (Jomsvikings) were composed of selected warriors who adhered to a special codex and were loyal only to their leader. Most records list as jarl of Jomsborg, Sigvald(i), son of petty king Strut-Harald of then Danish Scania. Sigvald died some time before 1010.

== The Curmsun Disc and the Gesta Wulinensis ecclesiae pontificum ==
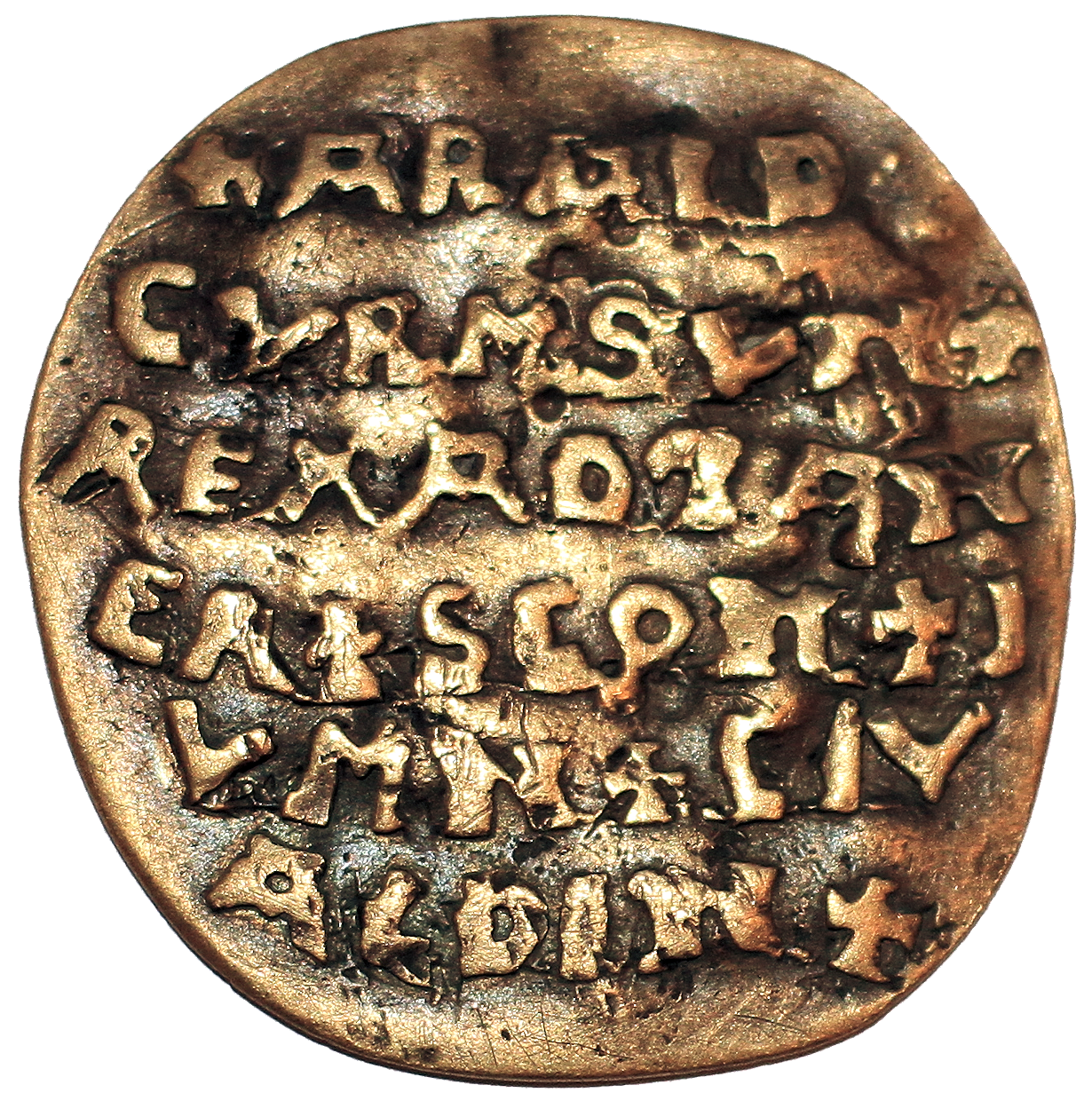
Curmsun Disc - Obverse.

A golden disc bearing the name of Harald Bluetooth and Jomsborg appeared in Sweden in autumn 2014, first presented by Swedish archaeologist Sven Rosborn. The disc, also called the Curmsun Disc, is made of high gold content and has a weight of 25.23 grams. On the obverse there is a Latin inscription and on the reverse there is a Latin cross with four dots surrounded by an octagonal ridge. The inscription reads: "+ARALD CVRMSVN+REX AD TANER+SCON+JVMN+CIV ALDIN+" and translates as "Harald Gormsson king of Danes, Scania, Jomsborg, diocese of Aldinburg".

It is claimed that the disc was a part of a Viking hoard found in 1841 in the Polish village Wiejkowo near the town of Wolin by Heinrich Boldt.

Following the find of the disc, Sven Rosborn also said he found a text that purports to be modern Polish translation of an otherwise unknown Latin chronicle, Gesta Wulinensis ecclesiae pontificum, which in addition to providing details on the Jomsvikings and Jomsborg, attributes to Jomsborg a location near Paprotno, Poland, at 53°51′50″N 14°43′05″E. Rosborn has visited the location and confirms that it matches the descriptions of Jomsborg from the various sagas and chronicles, and that various artifacts found on the surface of the location seem to match the period of time in which Jomsborg existed.

However, both the disc and the chronicle has been criticized for their unclear provenance. Archaeologist Jes Wienberg has criticized Rosborn for not allowing other scholars direct access to the finds, and that it thus is not possible to properly evaluate them. Historians Kurt Villads Jensen and Wojtek Jezierski have claimed that they are forgeries, noting that the disc has no known analogue, and that the chronicle contains several anachronisms.

== Historical events ==
- Harald Bluetooth died at Jomsborg in 985/86.
- Styrbjörn the Strong of Sweden and a force of Jomsvikings departed from Jomsborg to reclaim the Swedish throne from Eric the Victorious, yet were defeated in the Battle of Fýrisvellir near Gamla Uppsala in the mid 980s, probably in 986.
- Sweyn Forkbeard and a force of Jomsvikings departed from Jomsborg to eliminate jarl Haakon Sigurdsson of Norway, but were defeated in the Battle of Hjörungavágr (~990).
- Olaf I of Norway and a Jomsviking contingent departed from Jomsborg for the Battle of Svolder in 999 or 1000 AD.

== See also ==
- Early Swedish History
- Jomsvikings
- Pomerania during the Early Middle Ages

== Related Reading ==
- Eddison, E. R. (2011) Styrbiorn the Strong (University of Minnesota Press) ISBN 978-0816677559
- Halldórsson, Ólafur (2000) Danish Kings and the Jomsvikings in the Greatest Saga of Óláfr Tryggvason (Viking Society for Northern Research) ISBN 978-0-903521-47-5
- Hollander, Lee M. (1989) The Saga of the Jomsvikings (University of Texas Press) ISBN 978-0-292776-23-4
- Jones, Gwyn (2001) A History of the Vikings (2d ed.) (Oxford University Press) ISBN 978-0-192801-34-0
- Kunkel, Otto.; Karl A. Wilde (1941) Jumne, Vineta, Jomsburg, Julin, Wollin (Stettin: Landesmuseum)
- Schmidt, Roderich (2009) Das historische Pommern. Personen, Orte, Ereignisse (Böhlau Verlag) ISBN 978-3-412278-05-2
