= Þorleifr jarlsskáld =

Icelandic skald (10th century)

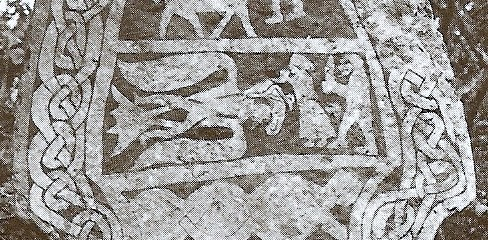
The Gotlandic image stone Hammars (III). It is held to depict Odin in his eagle fetch (note the eagle's beard), Gunnlöð (holding the mead of poetry) and Suttungr.

Þorleifr Rauðfeldarson, known by the epithet jarlsskáld or jarlaskáld ("earls'/earl's poet") was an Icelandic skald in the second half of the 10th century. He was one of the court poets of Jarl Hákon Sigurðarson and composed drápur on both the jarl and King Sweyn Forkbeard, but little of his work survives.

He is the protagonist of Þorleifs þáttr jarlaskálds, a largely fictional tale in the Flateyjarbók version of Óláfs saga Tryggvasonar en mesta, and is also mentioned in Svarfdœla saga and as a skald in a number of other sources, including Landnámabók and Skáldatal.

== Life ==
According to Svarfdœla saga, ch. 11 or 12, Þorleifr was one of twin sons of Ásgeir Rauðfeldarson of Brekka in Svarfaðardalur, born when their mother was out tending sheep. According to "Þorleifs þáttr jarlaskálds", written in the late 13th or early 14th century, he was the youngest of three sons. He went to Norway as a young man, but left after coming into conflict with Jarl Hákon over trading rights; Hákon burned his ship and killed the crew. He then went to Denmark, where he became a courtier of Sweyn Forkbeard's but returned to Norway to recite a níð verse at Hákon's court that caused the jarl's hair to fall out, after which Sweyn dubbed him jarlsskáld, "the earl's poet". After returning to Iceland he lived in Mýrdalur, but Hákon, with the assistance of his tutelary goddesses Þorgerðr Hǫlgabrúðr and Irpa, sent a wooden figure containing a man's heart that successfully killed him at the Alþingi in about 990. He was buried there at Þingvellir. The final chapter recounts how a shepherd and unsuccessful skald named Hallbjǫrn sat on Þorleifr's grave-mound and Þorleifr came to him in a dream and taught him the art of poetry. This story clearly incorporates many fantasy elements, and it is likely that Þorleifr spent longer at Jarl Hákon's court, but his composition of the níð verse is reported in several sources, including Oddr Snorrason's Latin life of Óláfr Tryggvason, so that detail must have been current by the end of the 12th century.

== Poems ==
Other than the níð verse on Jarl Hákon, which is probably genuine, surviving work by Þorleifr jarlsskáld includes six probably spurious lausavísur, the refrain from a drápa for King Sweyn that reportedly had 40 verses, and one and a half verses of a drápa for Jarl Hákon. Of this Hákonardrápa, the full verse is:

| Hôkun, vitum hvergi (hafizk hefr runnr af gunni) fremra jarl und ferli (folk-Ránar) þér mána. Þú hefr ǫðlinga Óðni —etr hrafn af ná getnum— —vesa mátt af því, vísi, víðlendr—níu senda. (Skaldic Poetry of the Scandinavian Middle Ages ed.) | Hákon, heard we under heaven no doughtier earl than thou—but greater grew thy glory fram wars—to govern. Athelings nine to Óthin— feeds the raven on flesh of fallen men—spread far thy fame aye—thou didst send forth. (Hollander's translation) | In Norway's land was never known A braver earl than the brave Hakon. At sea, beneath the clear moon's light, No braver man e'er sought to fight. Nine kings to Odin's wide domain Were sent, by Hakon's right hand slain! So well the raven-flocks were fed— So well the wolves were filled with dead! (Laing's translation) |

== In modern literature ==
Þórarinn Eldjárn's Hér liggur skáld (2012) is about Þorleifr jarlsskáld.
