= Strut-Harald =

Semi-legendary Danish petty king

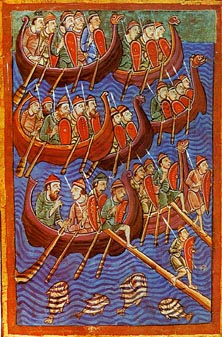

Strut-Harald (Cone Harald from his cone-shaped helmet of gold) was a semi-legendary jarl or petty king who ruled over the Danish territory of Scania (in what is now southern Sweden) during the late 10th century CE (approximately 975–986).

According to Snorri Sturluson, Strut-Harald was jarl of "Jomsborg in Wendland."

Strut-Harald was the father of Sigvaldi Strut-Haraldsson and Thorkell the Tall, both of whom became prominent members of the Jomsviking order and who fought against the Norwegian Haakon Jarl.

Sweyn Forkbeard succeeded him in his Scanian territories.
