= Skjegge Asbjørnsson =

Norwegian viking

- ᛌᚴᛁᚴᛁ ᚭᛌᛓᛁᛆᚱᚿᛆᚱᛌᚭᚿ
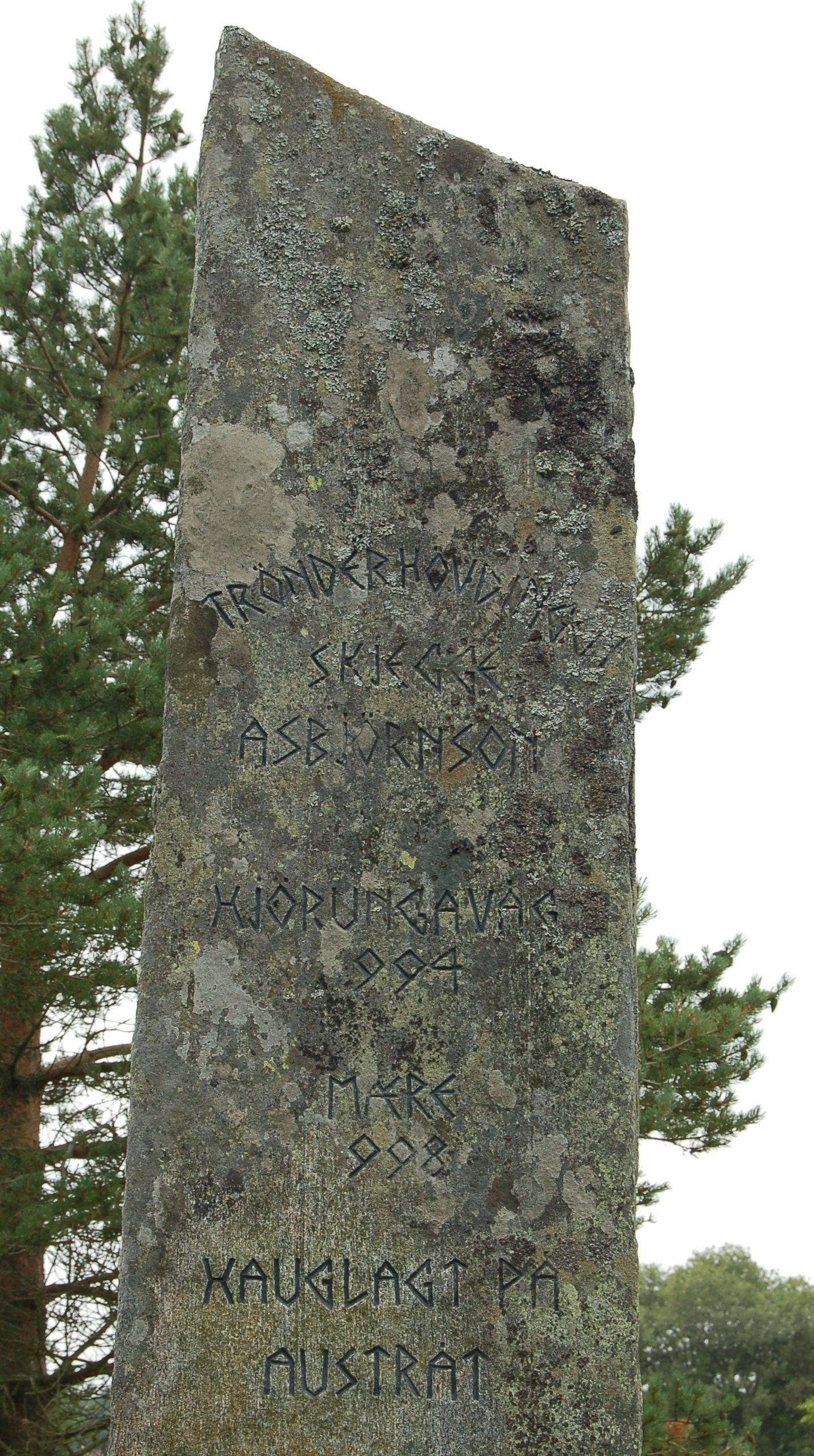
- Bauta dedicated to Skjegge Asbjørnsson, erected circa 1980

Personal details
- Born: before 986 Ørland, Norway
- Died: 997-998 Mære, Norway

Skjegge Asbjørnsson (Old Norse: Skeggi Ásbjarnarson, d. 997–998), also called Jernskjegge (Old Norse: Járnskeggi, lit. 'Ironbeard'), was a Norwegian viking chieftain of Ørland.

== Biography ==
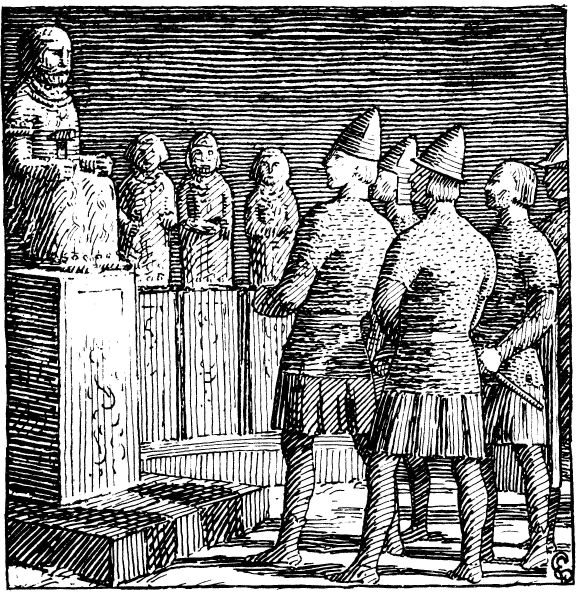
Olaf Tryggvason in Thor's shrine at Mære, by Halfdan Egedius

Skjegge's father was the wealthy land-owner Asbjørn Hordsson. Skjegge, along with Sweyn Haakonsson and Ragnvald Lodinsson, are said to have commanded 60 longships as part of Jarl Haakon Sigurdsson's fleet against the Jomsvikings in the Battle of Hjörungavágr. Skjegge's home was at Opphaug in Ørland.

When fanatical Christian King Olaf Tryggvason arrived at Mære in 997, Skjegge was among the local pagan chieftains and farmers from across the Trøndelag region who had gathered there to oppose the importation of Christianity. Skjegge requested that King Olaf observe a blót being conducted at a shrine to Thor "as other Kings in the land [had] done before [him]." King Olaf agreed, but once inside, he immediately attacked the image of Thor while his men seized and murdered Skjegge. Under threat of further violence, the frightened farmers agreed to convert to Christianity. The King then took some of them hostage to ensure that the others would "cleave to the new faith that was given them."

Skjegge's remains were brought back to Ørland and buried in a tumulus called Skjeggehaugen (lit. 'Skjegge's hill') on the grounds of what later became the Austrått manorial estate. Today, there are several small hills at Austrått called Skjeggehaugen and it is unknown which is the real site of Skjegge's grave.

Skjegge's daughter Gudrun (Old Norse: Guðrún Skeggisdóttir) was later given as a wife to King Olaf as part of a settlement between him and Skjegge's relatives, but she was sent away after she attempted to kill the King in his sleep to avenge her father.

== See also ==
- Tróndur í Gøtu
- Massacre in the Great Temple of Tenochtitlan
