= Vagn Åkesson =

Norseman of the late 10th century

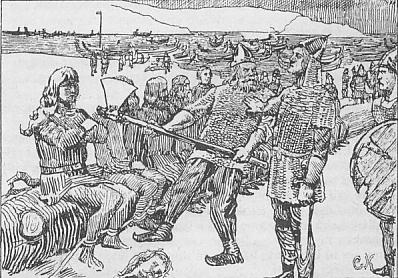
Eric gives quarter to Vagn after the battle of Hjörungavágr. Illustration by Christian Krohg.

Vagn Åkesson was a Norseman of the late 10th century, mentioned in the Jómsvíkinga saga. At the age of 12, Vagn, a warrior, applied for admission to the mercenary brotherhood of the Jomsvikings. According to the Jómsvíkinga saga, Vagn was the son of Aki, a son of the Jomsviking chieftain Palnatoke. Intrigued by the courage displayed by Vagn, his grandfather Palnatoke allowed him (after first attempting to dissuade him) to prove his worth with a duel against Sigvaldi Strut-Haraldsson, whom Vagn defeated. He was admitted to the order despite the Jomsviking rule that no man under the age of 18 be allowed to join.

Palnatoke adopted Vagn, who is described as one of the most fearless of the Jomsvikings, as a sort of protégé. Vagn's courage stands in sharp contrast to the pragmatism (some would say cowardice) displayed by Sigvaldi. After Palnatoke's death, Sigvaldi became leader of the order. At the Battle of Hjörungavágr, he ordered a retreat, an order which Vagn angrily refused to obey. According to the saga, Vagn even threw his spear in Sigvaldi's direction, but missed. Vagn managed to survive the battle with honor and was spared by Eiríkr Hákonarson, while Sigvaldi became the object of ridicule.
