= Thorkell the Tall =

10th and 11th century Danish warlord

Thorkell Haraldsson
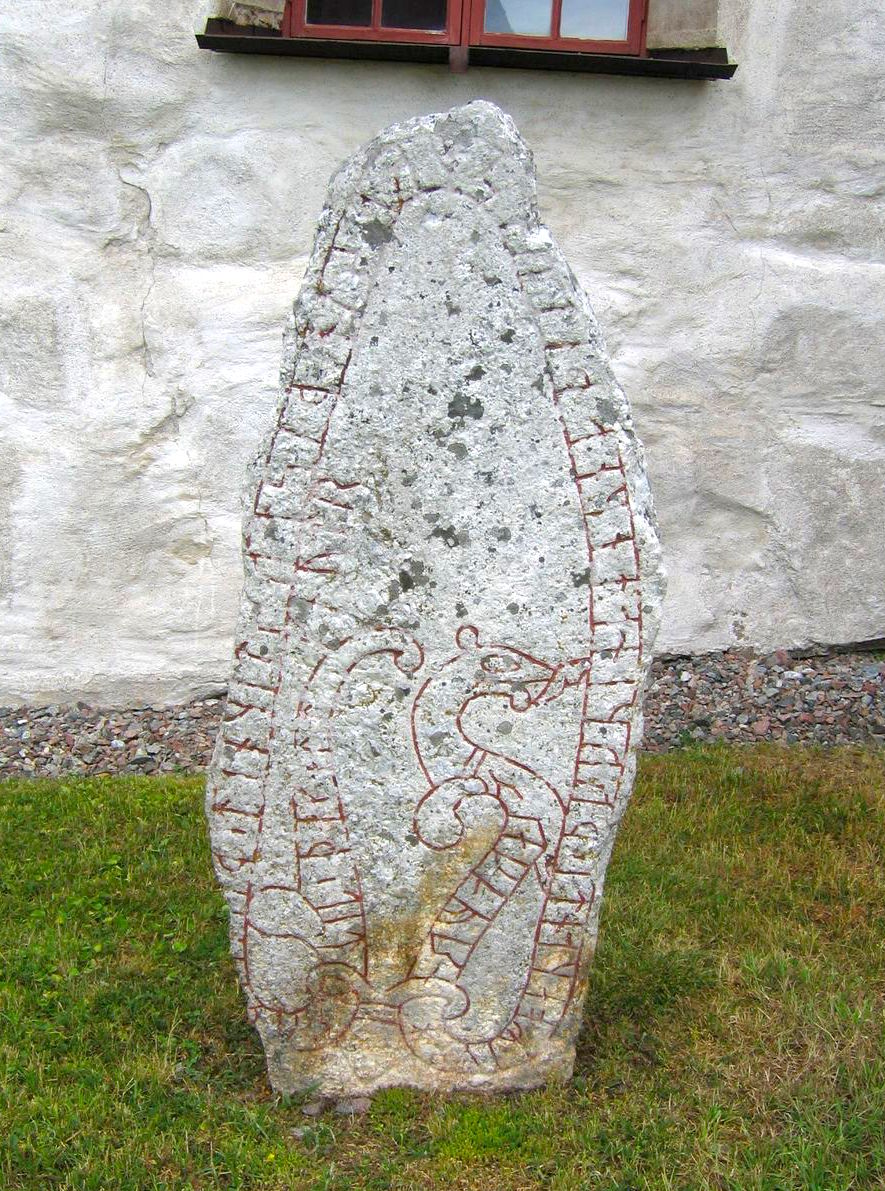
- The rune stone U 344 in Orkesta, Uppland, Sweden, was raised by the Viking Ulfr who commemorated that he had taken a danegeld in England with Thorkell the Tall. He took two others with Skagul Toste and Cnut the Great
- Born: c. 970
- Disappeared: 1023
- Spouse: Wulfhilda? (m. 1016)
- Children: Two unknown sons
- Military career
- Allegiance: Kingdom of Denmark (970–1013); Kingdom of England (1013–1015); North Sea Empire (1015–1023)
- Nickname: The Tall
- Conflicts: Battle of Hjorungavagr; Battle of Svolder; Battle of Ringmere Heath; Siege of Canterbury; Battle of Penselwood; Battle of Sherston; Battle of Brentford (1016); Battle of Otford (1016); Battle of Assandun

Thorkell the Tall (Old Norse: Þorke(ti)ll inn hávi) was a Danish warlord who prominently took part in battles in the late 10th and early 11th centuries. He was a son of the Scanian chieftain Strut-Harald, and a brother of Jarl Sigvaldi, Hemingr and Tófa.

== Background ==
Thorkell was said to be the chief commander of the legendary Jomsvikings and the stronghold of Jomsborg, on the Island of Wollin. He is also credited as having received the young Cnut the Great into his care and taken Cnut on raids. The Encomium Emmae, a document concerning significant individuals in the Anglo-Scandinavian court in the early 1040s, describes Thorkell as a great war leader and warrior.

== Biography ==
Thorkell is a historical figure, but his career, especially its early part, is steeped in associations with the legendary Jomsvikings. Thorkell took part in the Battle of Hjörungavágr in 986 and in the Battle of Swold in 1000.

Thorkell led a campaign that ravaged most of Southern England throughout the span of 3 years. In August 1009, a large Danish army led by Thorkell the Tall landed on the shores of Sandwich. They first marched towards the city of Canterbury but were promptly paid 3000 pounds of silver by the people of Kent to sway the army from attacking. They instead turned towards London and attempted to take the city several times, but were met with heavy resistance and ultimately abandoned their attack.

On 8 September 1011 Thorkell’s army returned to Canterbury and besieged it for two weeks, eventually taking it through the treachery of a man named Ælfmaer, whose life had been previously saved by the archbishop of Canterbury, Ælfheah. Thorkell and his men occupied Canterbury and took several hostages of importance, including Ælfheah himself, who was held prisoner for seven months. During the captivity, Ælfheah seems to have taken the opportunity to convert as many of the pagan Scandinavians as possible to Christianity, prompting tension. The army demanded an extra 3000 pounds of silver for the release of the archbishop, but Ælfheah bravely refused to be ransomed or have his people pay the invaders. As a consequence, Ælfheah was murdered by Thorkell's men during a drunken feast at Greenwich on 19 April 1012: the Scandinavians pelted him with the bones of cattle before one man finished him off with a blow to the back of the head with the butt of an axe. Thorkell was said to have tried his best to prevent the death of the archbishop, offering the attackers everything he possessed to stop the killing, save for his ship. And someone, possibly Thorkell, is said to have carried the corpse to London the day after the murder. Thorkell's army eventually ceased their attacks across Southern England, but only after a large series of danegeld payments were made, eventually culminating to 48,000 pounds of silver.

Thorkell and his loyalists defected, taking 45 longships with them. He and his men subsequently entered into the service of the English King Æthelred the Unready as mercenaries, for whom they fought in 1013 against the invasion of Danish King Sweyn Forkbeard. The Danish historian Niels Lund writes that Thorkell "was probably the leader of a gang of thugs based somewhere in the Baltic"; his alliance with Æthelred was a serious threat to Swein, who needed to break it.

During Cnut’s invasion of England, Thorkell had defected to Cnut’s side and abandoned the English, where he proceeded to fight five battles in one year against the English army, led by King Edmund Ironside. After the death of Edmund on 30 November 1016, Cnut became king of England and he divided the country into four earldoms – making Thorkell the Jarl of East Anglia.

In 1021, for unknown reasons, Thorkell is very briefly described as falling out with Cnut, with the former being banished by the king and returning to Denmark. However, Cnut later reconciled with Thorkell in 1023, seemingly aware of the strong connections and influence he had in his home country and that he was too powerful a man to be made an enemy of. As a result, he was granted the earldom of Denmark and given custody of Cnut's son Harthacnut, to whom Thorkell would serve as foster-father. Thorkell's rule was a short one, with Cnut's brother-in-law Ulf the Earl to become Jarl of Denmark a year later. The perceived power vacuum of Thorkell's unexplained absence after 1023 and the commitment of Cnut in England, prompted King Olaf II of Norway and King Anund Jacob of Sweden to launch attacks on the Danish in the Baltic Sea. The Swedish and Norwegian navies led by kings Anund Jacob and Olaf II lay in wait up the river for the navy of King Cnut, which was commanded by Danish earl Ulf Jarl. Now known as the Battle of Helgeå, the decisive victory left Cnut the dominant leader in Scandinavia.

There is no mention of Thorkell after 1023, and it is not known when and how he died. He was celebrated in his lifetime by poets and monks, such as Joseph the Bard. He also appeared in the Jomsvikinga Saga and on runestones for his exploits. Thorkell's proven shrewd nature and wisdom were well documented. The sometimes contradictory contemporary literature of the Encomium Emmae Reginae has Thorkell as being in service of, rather than the threat to, Cnut and Harthacnut's authority. It is known one of Thorkell's sons was a prominent member of Harthacnut's retinue; after the collapse and subsequent death of Harthacnut at the wedding feast of Tovi the Proud in 1042, Thorkell's wife and two sons were expelled from England. This was possibly linked to the intrigue that surrounded Magnus the Good's letter of intention to invade the realm of Edward the Confessor, with the ambition to reunite the kingdoms of what is now described as the North Sea Empire.

== Family ==
Thorkell may have married a daughter of Æthelred the Unready called Wulfhild or Edith, who was the widow of Ulfcytel Snillingr. Thorkell had a son who accompanied Cnut back to England in 1023.

== Note ==
Preceded by Ulfcytel Snillingr	Earl of East Anglia; 1017–1021	Succeeded by ?
