= Sigvaldi Strut-Haraldsson =

Chieftain of the fabled Jomsvikings (10th century)

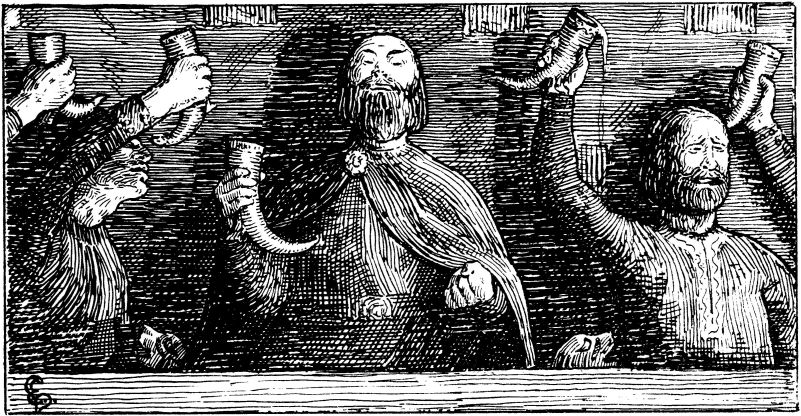
At the funeral feast, Jarl Sigvaldi swears an oath on his father's memory to go to Norway and kill or drive away Haakon Jarl. Halfdan Egedius: Illustration for Olav Trygvasons saga (1899)

Jarl Sigvaldi was the semi-legendary chieftain of the fabled Jomsvikings and commander of their stronghold - Jomsborg. He succeeded Palnatoke as the leaders of the Jomsvikings in the late 10th century. The character of Sigvaldi remains largely enigmatic. As a leader, he was said to be more wily than brave despite leading such a powerful force.

== Biography ==
Sigvaldi Strut-Haraldsson was the son of Jarl Strut-Harald, who ruled over the Danish territory of Scania and the brother of Thorkell the Tall.

In order to win Astrid, the daughter of the Wendish chieftain Burislav, he promised to liberate the Wends of the tribute they had to pay to the Danes. He fulfilled his promise by sailing to Zealand where he sent the message to King Sweyn Forkbeard that he had important tidings, but had fallen ill and could not come in person to bring them to him. When Sweyn went aboard Sigvaldi's ship, he was captured by the Jomsvikings. To be liberated, the Danish king had to agree to grant independence to both the Jomsvikings and to the Wends, in addition to paying a king's ransom. In further negotiations, it was agreed that Sweyn would marry Gunhild of Wenden, the daughter of Burislav, while Burislav would marry Sweyn's sister Tyri.

At the time of the funeral of his father, Strut-Harald, Sigvaldi was advised by Sweyn to join the attack on Norway to depose Haakon Sigurdsson. This promise would lead to the defeat of Jomsvikings at the Battle of Hjörungavágr in 986, from which Sigvaldi fled with disgrace.

In 1000, Sigvaldi proved to be treacherous at the Battle of Svolder by luring Olaf Tryggvason to the battle. According to Snorri Sturluson in Heimskringla, Sigvaldi arrived to tell him rumors of a planned ambush were false. He led him into an ambush and deserted him in the heat of battle. There is no record of Sigvaldi after the Battle of Svolder. The invasion of England in 1009 by his brother Thorkell the Tall was allegedly intended to avenge Sigvaldi's death, so it is possible Sigvaldi met his end in England.

== See also ==
- Vagn Åkesson

== Bibliography ==
- Oddr Snorrason; Theodore Murdock Andersson (2003). The Saga of Olaf Tryggvason. ISBN 978-0-8014-4149-3.
- Snorri Sturluson; Lee M. Hollander (1991). Heimskringla: History of the Kings of Norway. University of Texas Press. ISBN 978-0-292-73061-8.
- Lee M. Hollander (1955). The Saga of the Jómsvíkings. ISBN 978-0-292-77623-4.
- Alison Finlay (2004). Fargrskinna, a catalogue of the Kings of Norway. Brill Academic Pub. ISBN 978-90-04-13172-9.
