= Vigfúss Víga-Glúmsson =

Icelandic skald

Vigfúss Víga-Glúmsson (Old Norse: [ˈwiɣˌfuːsː ˈwiːɣɑ-ˌɡluːmsˌson]; Modern Icelandic: [ˈvɪɣˌfusː ˈviːɣa-ˌklumsˌsɔːn]) was an Icelandic skald, active around the year 1000. He was the son of Víga-Glúmr, the protagonist of Víga-Glúms saga. According to various sources, Vígfúss was the court poet of Hákon Sigurðarson, but only two verses of his poetry, preserved in Fagrskinna, have come down to us.

Vígfúss has a role in several Icelanders' sagas, including Víga-Glúms saga, Ögmundar þáttr and Ljósvetninga saga. According to the kings' sagas he fought with Earl Hákon against the Jomsvikings in the Battle of Hjörungavágr.
