= Finnboga saga ramma =

Icelandic saga

Finnboga saga ramma (The Saga of Finnbogi the Strong) is an Icelandic saga that recounts the life of Finnbogi rammi. The story takes place in Flateyjardalur in Suður-Þingeyjarsýsla and in other places in Iceland, as well as in Norway. The events supposedly took place in the 10th century. Finnbogi rammi is mentioned in Landnámabók, and Íslendingadrápa.

The saga was likely composed in the fourteenth century, usually grouped with "postclassical" sagas". This ambiguous generic distinction has been argued to be unclear and based on a bias towards a realistic saga style. In fact, Finnboga saga appears in one of the earliest extant manuscripts containing complete sagas of Icelanders. Margrét Eggertsdóttir summaries the saga thus:

Finnboga saga ramma is not one the better-crafted Íslendingasögur. Characterization is flat, and the plot little more than a repetitious series of episodes designed to present the hero in a favorable light. The narrative is nevertheless lively and makes good reading.

A feud in the saga also features in Vatnsdœla saga. Björn M. Ólsen proposed that Finnboga saga ramma was written to present a better version of Finnbogi than that in Vatnsdœla saga. However, van Hamel suggests that the two sagas record different versions of the same incident.

The saga is preserved in two main versions in the vellum manuscripts Möðruvallabók and Tómasarbók as well as a number of seventeenth century paper manuscripts derived from these.

Guðmundr Bergþórsson wrote rímur based on the story in 1686 and there is a Faroese ballad based on the saga or a common source.

== Synopsis ==
When the Icelander Þorgerðr Þorkelsdóttir gives birth to a son, her husband Ásbjörn forces her to expose the child as a way of taking revenge on her for previously marrying off their daughter without his permission. The infant is rescued by Þorgerðr's foster-mother, who names him Urðaköttr and raises him as her own, but when Urðaköttr is twelve years old, the truth is exposed by his wise maternal uncle, Þorgeirr Ljósvetningagoði, and Ásbjörn accepts the boy as his son.

Shortly thereafter, Urðaköttr rescues a shipwrecked Norwegian named Finnbogi Bárðarson, who dies soon afterward from his injuries, but not before asking Urðaköttr to take his name to ensure that his memory is not forgotten. Urðaköttr does so, and is subsequently known as Finnbogi Ásbjarnarson.

Upon reaching adulthood, Finnbogi subsequently becomes anxious to travel abroad, and resolves to visit the court of Hákon Sigurðarson, the Jarl of Hlaðir and effective ruler of Norway. While en route he kills a man called Álfr, who transpires to be the husband of Hákon's niece, but Finnbogi nevertheless continues on to Hlaðir and there confesses the killing to the jarl. To atone for his crime, Finnbogi is first forced to fight a monstrous bear (which he kills), and is then sent on an errand to collect a debt owed to Jarl Hákon by a man named Bersi inn hvíti, who has taken service with the Varangian Guard in Constantinople. Finnbogi successfully completes the mission, and while in Constantinople he has a personal audience with the Byzantine emperor John I Tzimisces, who bestows on him the epithet 'the Strong' (rammi in Norse). Having reconciled himself with Hákon by performing this task, Finnbogi marries the jarl's great-niece Ragnhildr Álfsdóttir (daughter of his earlier victim Álfr) and, having satisfied his desire for fame and glory, returns to Iceland to become a farmer.

Some years later, Finnbogi becomes involved in two separate feuds, one with the prominent chieftain Eyjólfr Valgerðarson and the other with the sorcerer Þorvaldr moðskegg. Þorvaldr murders Finnbogi's two sons, and although Finnbogi gets revenge by killing Þorvaldr, Ragnhildr is so distraught at the loss of her children that she dies of grief. At this low ebb in his fortunes, Finnbogi contemplates going abroad again, but his uncle Þorgeirr convinces him to stay and arranges for him to remarry to Eyjólfr's daughter Hallfríðr, thereby resolving the other outstanding conflict in the district. Despite the political nature of the match, Finnbogi and Hallfríðr soon come to love each other deeply and have seven sons together.

The remainder of the saga is concerned with a further long-running feud, this time between Finnbogi and Jökull Ingimundarson (the same feud is also retold from the perspective of Jökull and his brothers in Vatnsdæla saga), but a resolution is eventually found that is satisfactory to both sides.

== Bibliography ==
=== Manuscripts ===
The website handrit.is records 41 manuscripts containing Finnboga saga ramma.

- AM 132 fol. (Möðruvallabók) - 14th century
- AM 519 4to (Tómasarbók) - 15th century
- AM 162c fol (1 leaf) - 15th century

=== Editions ===
- Gering, Hugo (1879). Finnboga saga hins ramma. Halle: Niemeyer.
- Halldórsson, Jóhannes (1959). Kjalnesinga saga. Íslenzk Fornrit 14. Reykjavík: Hið Íslenzka Fornritafélag.
- Modern Icelandic edition

=== Translations ===
- Bachman, W. Bryant; Erlingsson, Guðmundur (1990). The Saga of Finnbogi the Strong. Lanham, MD: University Press of America. ISBN 978-0819175946. OCLC 20217973.
- Klapouchy, Robert J. (1974). The Saga of Finnbogi the Strong: A Translation from the Old Norse with an afterword. University of Wisconsin–Madison (M.A. thesis). OCLC 609053741.
