= Tómasarbók =

16th-century Icelandic manuscript

Tómasarbók (Reykjavík, Stofnun Árna Magnússonar, AM 510 4to) is a mid-sixteenth-century Icelandic manuscript, written between 1540 and 1560 by Ari Jónsson and his sons Jón and Tómas Arason.

It contains eight sagas, including one of the two main sources of Finnboga saga ramma and the youngest version of Jómsvíkinga saga, which may contain interpolations from an older, independent version of this saga. Eight of the eleven remaining stanzas of Tindr Hallkelsson's Hákonardrápa are preserved in this version of Jómsvíkinga saga.

== Contents ==
As catalogued at Handrit.is, the manuscript contains the following texts:

- Víglundar saga (1r-8r)
- Bósa saga (8v-21r)
- Jarlmanns saga og Hermanns (21r-32v)
- Þorsteins þáttur bæjarmagns (32v-38v)
- Jómsvíkinga saga (38v-67r)
- Finnboga saga ramma (67r-88v)
- Drauma-Jóns saga (88v-91v)
- Friðþjófs saga (91v-96r)
