= Skaldic Poetry of the Scandinavian Middle Ages =

Skaldic Poetry of the Scandinavian Middle Ages is a project which is editing the corpus of Old Norse-Icelandic skaldic poetry., along with all poetry written down in runes. The project will publish nine volumes and is supported by a website. The corpus comprises 5797 verses by 447 skalds preserved in 718 manuscripts. As of September 2026, six volumes have been published, all of which can be accessed via the project's website.

Anatoly Liberman wrote in a review of volume 7: "As far as the textual criticism and decipherment of skaldic poetry are concerned, after this edition not much is left for anyone to add".

== List of volumes ==
- Whaley, Diana, ed. (2012). Poetry from the Kings' Sagas 1: From Mythical Times to c. 1035. Vol. 1.
- Gade, Kari Ellen, ed. (2009). Poetry from the Kings' Sagas 2: From c. 1035 to c. 1300. Vol. 2.
- Gade, Kari Ellen; Marold, Edith, eds. (2017). Poetry from Treatises on Poetics. Vol. 3.
- Nordal, Guðrún (ed.). Poetry on Icelandic History. Vol. 4. Forthcoming
- Wills, Tarrin; Gade, Kari Ellen; Clunies Ross, Margaret, eds. (2022). Poetry in Sagas of Icelanders. Vol. 5.
- Marold, Edith; Busch, Vivian; Krüger, Jana (eds.). Runic Poetry. Vol. 6. Forthcoming
- Clunies Ross, Margaret, ed. (2012). Poetry on Christian Subjects. Vol. 7.
- Clunies Ross, Margaret, ed. (2017). Poetry in fornaldarsögur. Vol. 8.
- Burrows, Hannah, ed. (2012). Bibliography and Indices. Vol. 9. Forthcoming
