= Jómsvíkingadrápa =

Jómsvikingadrápa is a 13th-century skaldic poem composed by Bjarni Kolbeinsson (d. 1222), Bishop of Orkney. It is a tribute in drápa form to the fallen Jomsvikings at the Battle of Hjörungavágr.

== Other sources ==
- Chase, Martin (2014 ) Eddic, Skaldic, and Beyond: Poetic Variety in Medieval Iceland and Norway (Fordham University Press) ISBN 9780823257836
- Crawford, Barbara E. (1987) Scandinavian Scotland (Leicester University Press) ISBN 0-7185-1197-2
- Pulsiano, Phillip; Kirsten Wolf (1993) Medieval Scandinavia: An Encyclopedia (Taylor & Francis) ISBN 9780824047870
- Ross, Margaret Clunies (2011) A History of Old Norse Poetry (DS Brewer) ISBN 9781843842798
