= Battle of Hjörungavágr =

10th century Norwegian–Danish naval battle

Coordinates: 62°21′30″N 6°06′00″E

Battle of Hjǫrungavágr
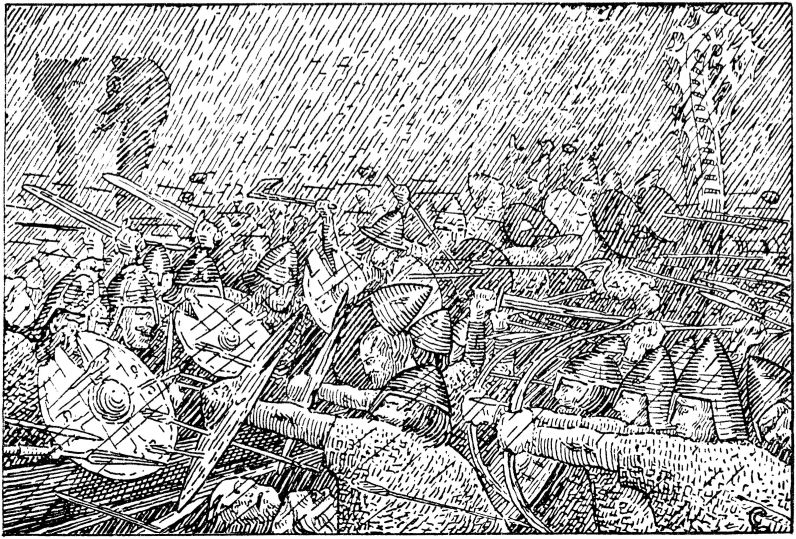
- The hailstorm during the Battle of Hjǫrungavágr, by Halfdan Egedius
Date	c. 986
Location	Coast of Sunnmøre
Result	Norwegian victory

Belligerents
Norway	Denmark; Jomsvikings

Commanders and leaders
Haakon Sigurdsson; Eric Haakonsson; Sweyn Haakonsson; Skjegge Asbjørnsson; Ragnvald Lodinsson	Sigvaldi Strut-Haraldsson; Vagn Åkesson; Búi digri

Strength
180 ships	60 ships

The Battle of Hjǫrungavágr (Norwegian: Slaget ved Hjørungavåg) is a semi-legendary naval battle that took place in the late 10th century between the Jarls of Lade and a Danish invasion fleet led by the fabled Jomsvikings. This battle played an important role in the struggle by Haakon Sigurdsson (c. 937 – 995) to unite his rule over Norway. Traditionally, the battle has been set during the year 986.

== History ==
During this period, Denmark was the dominant power in the Nordic region. Southern Norway and the Oslo Fjord sometimes lay directly under Danish rule. Haakon Sigurdsson ruled Norway as a vassal of King Harald Bluetooth of Denmark (died c. 985/86), but for the most part seemed to remain an independent ruler. Haakon was a strong believer in the old Norse gods. When Harald Bluetooth attempted to force Christianity upon him around 975, Haakon broke his allegiance to Denmark. Harald Bluetooth had suffered defeat from Otto II, Holy Roman Emperor during 974. Haakon took advantage of the weakened position of the Danish king to make Norway independent of Denmark. With the convincing victory, Haakon Sigurdsson remained Norway's sole ruler and Denmark's claim over Norway was rejected and not repeated again until the Battle of Svolder about fourteen years later.

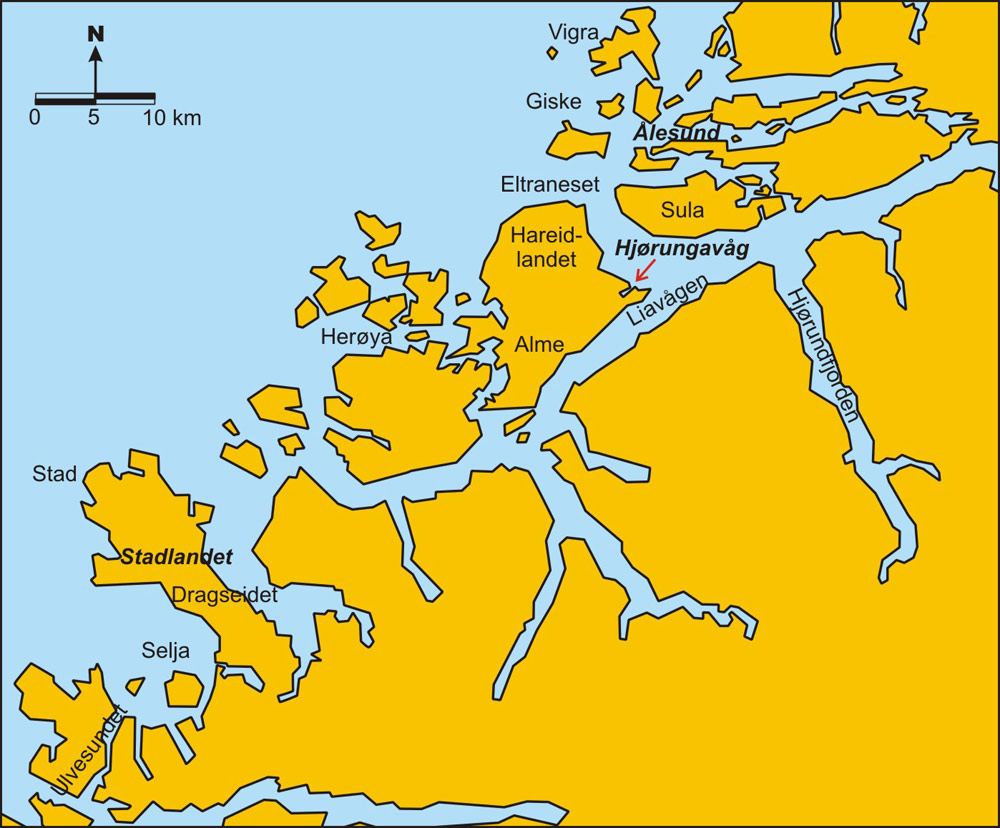
Hareidlandet in Møre og Romsdal

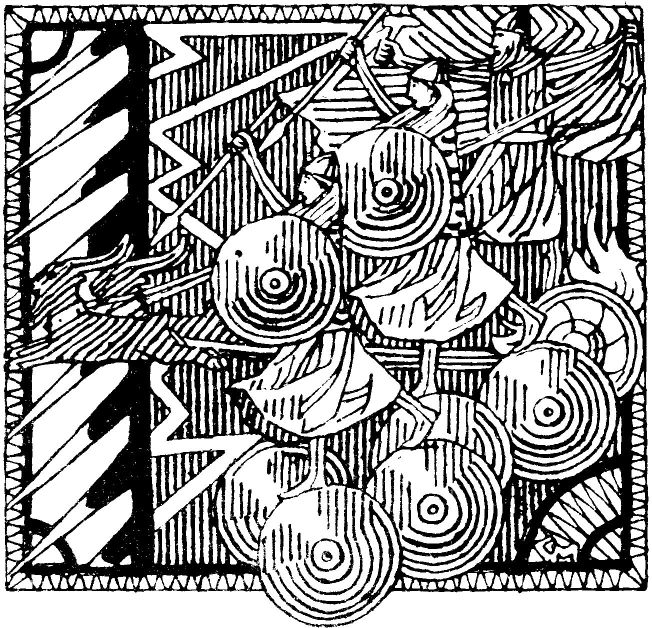
Storm in Hjørungavåg by Gerhard Munthe

== Location ==
Jómsvíkinga saga offers two mutually contradictory descriptions of the bay on the coast of Sunnmøre in which the battle took place. According to the first one, Hjǫrungavágr lies on the landward side of the island Hoð (now Hareidlandet in Møre og Romsdal). According to the other, the bay is situated south of an island called Primsigð/Primsignd and north of an island called Horund. Both of these names are not in common use today.

== Sources ==
The battle is described in the Norse kings' sagas—including Heimskringla—as well as in Jómsvíkinga saga and Saxo Grammaticus' Gesta Danorum. Saxo Grammaticus estimated that the battle took place while Harald Bluetooth was still alive. Scholarly traditions have set the battle in 986. Some contemporary skaldic poetry alludes to the battle, including verses by Þórðr Kolbeinsson and Tindr Hallkelsson. The battle was also the subject of later poems and sagas. Jómsvíkingadrápa by Bjarni Kolbeinsson honors the fallen Jomsvikings at the Battle of Hjǫrungavágr. Vellekla, composed by the Icelandic skald Einarr Helgason, speaks of the Battle of Hjǫrungavágr. Fagrskinna, contains a history of Norway with a heavy emphasis on battles, including the Battle of Hjǫrungavágr.

== See also ==
- Sigvaldi Strut-Haraldsson
- Vagn Åkesson
- Eiríkr Hákonarson
- Thorkell the Tall
- Vigfúss Víga-Glúmsson
- Þorgerðr Hölgabrúðr and Irpa

== Related reading ==
- Näsström, Britt-Mari (2001) Blot - tro og offer i det førkristne Norden (Pax) ISBN 82-530-2146-1
- Steinsland, Gro (2005) Norrøn religion. Myter, riter, samfunn (Pax) ISBN 82-530-2607-2
- Fløtre, Odd Karstein (2009) Jomsvikingslaget i oppklarende lys (Hatlehols Grafiske AS) ISBN 978-82-92055-34-2
- Ottesen, Johan (2010) Slagstaden (Fotoarkivet) ISBN 978-82-93042-01-3
- Larsen, Stein Ugelvik (2006) Striden om stedet : Hjørungavåg-slaget i norsk historie og kulturdebatt (Sunnmørsposten forl.) ISBN 82-914-5014-5
