= Jómsvíkinga saga =

Medieval Icelandic saga

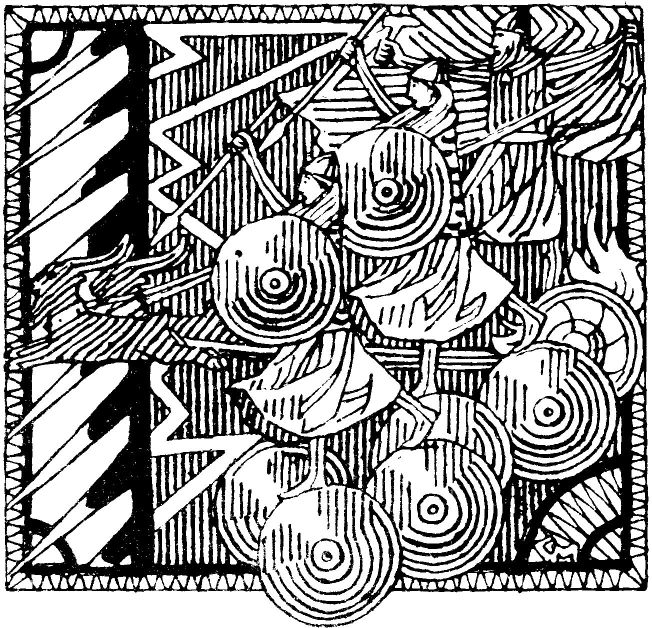
Storm in Hjørungavåg by Gerhard Munthe

The Jómsvíkinga saga ("Saga of the Jomsvikings") is a medieval Icelandic saga composed by an anonymous author. The saga was composed in Iceland during the 13th century. It exists in several manuscripts which vary from each other. There are many different versions and translations of the saga.

== The saga ==
At the time of writing, Wolin, also known as Willon, off the southern coast of the Baltic Sea, was not more than a typical market town of the 13th century. However, the Jómsvíkinga saga tells the story of its founding, centuries earlier, as the famed Jómsborg by the legendary Danish chieftain Pálna-Tóki. Jómsborg's name is composed of two elements: the Old Norse term borg, meaning a citadel, and the unidentified term, Jóm. The Jómsvíkinga saga is centered around the tensions between Haraldr Gormsson of Denmark, Hákon Sigurðarson of Norway, and the Jómsvíkings. The Jómsvíkings challenged royal authority in the midst of a power struggle between Denmark and Norway. In order to better understand the Jómsvíkinga saga, it is important to understand the relationship between Denmark and Norway around this time. In addition to founding Jómsborg, Pálna-Tóki founded the brotherhood of the Jómsvíkings. The saga describes the brotherhood and the laws of the Jómsvíkings. It also mentions their defeat during the semi-legendary naval Battle of Hjǫrungavágr in 986. This battle occurred between the Jarls of Lade and the Danish invasion fleet of King Harald Bluetooth of Denmark. Jómsvíking chieftain Sigvaldi Strut-Haraldsson, led the Jómsvíkings in an effort to depose Jarl Hákon Sigurðarson, vassal ruler of Norway. The Jómsvíkings lived monastically and primarily in the Baltic region. The only things that are proven to have existed that were mentioned in the Jómsvíkinga saga are many of the main characters (excluding Pálna-Tóki), the Battle of Hjǫrungavágr, and the existence of Jómsborg. Aside from those things, the rest is an unsolved mystery.

== History ==
There are five versions of the Jómsvíkinga saga that have been recovered over the years. The first, MS AM.291, is an incomplete manuscript written by an Icelander in the late thirteenth century. The second, MS AM. 510 4to, was written in the fifteenth century and contains much more information than the other versions. The third, Codex Holmanius 7, written in the fourteenth century, is shorter than the other versions and gives a brief summary of the saga. The fourth, Flateyjarbók, is a combination of the Jómsvíking saga and the Greater saga of Óláfr Tryggvason. Lastly, the fifth version, was a Latin translation of Arngrímr Jónsson written in the year 1592.

Historians have found it difficult to classify the Jómsvíkinga saga among the Old Norse sagas. It is sometimes counted among the Kings' sagas based principally upon the association with Danish kings. Both the Kings' sagas and the Jómsvíkinga saga can be looked at through a political lens.

== Popular culture ==
Jómsvíkinga saga served as inspiration for Henry Treece's novel Horned Helmet (1963).

== Translations ==
- The Saga of the Jomsvikings: Translated from the Icelandic with Introduction, Notes and Appendices, trans. by N.F. Blake (London: Thomas Nelson and Sons Ltd, 1962) (Nelson's Icelandic Texts)
- The Saga of the Jomsvikings: A Translation with Full Introduction, trans. by Alison Finlay and Þórdís Edda Jóhannesdóttir (Kalamazoo: Medieval Institute Publications, 2018), ISBN 978-1580443111.

== See also ==
- Jómsvíkingadrápa

== Other sources ==
- Fløtre, Odd Karstein (2009) Jomsvikingslaget i oppklarende lys (Hatlehols AS) ISBN 978-82-92055-34-2
- Halldórsson, Ólafur (1993) Jómsvíkinga saga (Medieval Scandinavia: An Encyclopedia. Ed. Phillip Pulsiano et al., Routledge Encyclopedias of the Middle Ages; 343–44) ISBN 978-0824047870
- Blake, N.F. (1962) "The Saga of the Jómsvíkings" (Thomas Nelson and Sons Ltd)

== Related Reading ==
- Hreinsson, Viðar (1997) The Complete Sagas of Icelanders (including 49 Stories) (Iceland: Leifur Eiriksson Publishing Ltd) ISBN 978-9979929307
