= Harðar saga ok Hólmverja =

Icelandic saga

Harðar saga ok Hólmverja or Harðar saga og Hólmverja is one of the sagas of Icelanders. It is preserved in two medieval, vellum manuscripts, Reykjavík, Stofnun Árna Magnússonar, AM 556a 4to ff. 70r-88r (from c. 1475), and the fragment AM 564a, 4to (Pseudo-Vatnshyrna, c. 1400), f. 7. It also survives in a further thirty-seven paper manuscripts, all descended from AM 556a 4to.

The saga takes place in southwestern Iceland in the latter half of the 900s. It is about Hord Grimkjelsson and Hord's companions (Hólmverjar). Hord and his companions travel to Norway and Götaland where Hord marries Helga. When they return to Iceland after 15 years, they settle down on an islet in Hvalfjörður.

== Plot ==
In Commonwealth-era Iceland, Signý Valbrandsdóttir marries Grímkell Bjarnarson against the will of her brother Torfi, who subsequently becomes obsessed with taking revenge on Grímkell and his children, Hǫrðr and Þorbjǫrg. Hǫrðr is fostered by Grímr inn litli, and becomes firm friends with Grímr's son, Geirr Grímsson. Hǫrðr and Geirr go abroad, taking with them Hǫrðr’s manservant Helgi Sigmundarson, and befriend Jarl Haraldr of Gautland. Jarl Haraldr's daughter Helga Haraldsdóttir marries Hǫrðr, while his son Hróarr Haraldsson accompanies Hǫrðr and Geirr on a profitable 'Viking' (raiding) expedition.

Hǫrðr, Geirr and their followers subsequently return to Iceland, but soon afterwards Helgi Sigmundarson kills a farmhand in a fit of rage, and Torfi seizes the opportunity to prosecute Hǫrðr (as Helgi's master) for the homicide. Hǫrðr’s brother-in-law Indriði Þorvaldsson (Þorbjǫrg’s husband) refuses to support him, and both Hǫrðr and Helgi are outlawed. They burn down Hǫrðr’s farm in order to prevent Torfi seizing it, and they and Hǫrðr's family subsequently move in with Geirr. When it becomes known that Geirr is sheltering outlaws, all of them are forced to relocate again to an island in Hvalfjörður, which is subsequently known as Geirshólm ('Geirr's Island'). There they are joined by other fugitives from across Iceland, forming a band of outlaws known as the Hólmsmenn ('Islanders'). The Hólmsmenn have various clashes with local farmers, who are unable to deal with them because Geirshólm provides them with an impregnable refuge.

The farmers eventually band together to work out a way to get to grips with the outlaws. Þorbjǫrg Grímkelsdóttir attends the meeting and vows that if the farmers kill her brother she will avenge him. A certain Kjartan Kǫtluson volunteers to lure the Hólmsmenn to the mainland, and although he is killed in the process the plan is successful and all of the outlaws are captured and executed, including Hǫrðr and Geirr. The farmers subsequently plan to travel to Geirshólm and kill Hǫrðr's young sons in order to ensure that they do not later seek revenge for their father, but they and their mother (Helga Haraldsdóttir) escape by swimming to the mainland. Þorbjǫrg takes them in and browbeats her husband Indriði into slaying Þorsteinn gullknappr, the man who killed Hǫrðr. Later, the Harðarsons complete their family's revenge by killing the other farmers.

== Other sources ==
Vidar Hreinsson (1997) The Complete Sagas of Icelanders, including 49 tales (Leifur Eiríksson Pub) ISBN 978-9979929307
