= Palnatoke =

Legendary Danish hero and chieftain of the island of Fyn

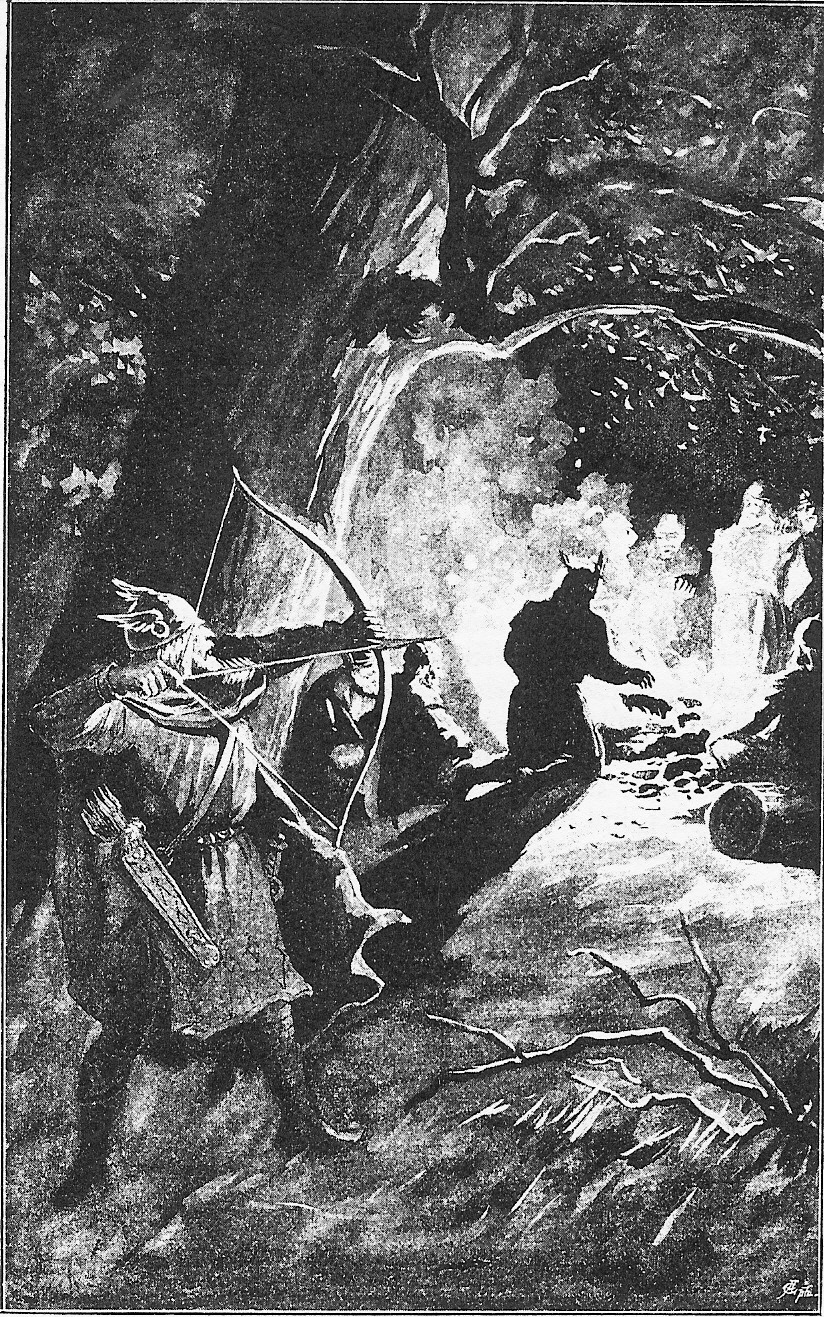
Palnatoki prepares to kill King Harald Bluetooth by Jenny Nyström (1895).

Palnatoke or Palnatoki, sometimes written Palna-Toki or Palna Toki (Old Norse: Pálnatóki or Pálna-Tóki [ˈpɑːlnɑˌtoːke]), was a legendary Danish hero and chieftain of the island of Fyn. According to the Jómsvíkinga saga, Palnatoki founded the brotherhood of Jomsvikings and established its laws.

According to the Jómsvíkinga saga, he was the son of Pálnir Tókason and his wife Íngibjörg who was the daughter of the Geatish earl Ottar Jarl. Palnatoke raised king Harald Bluetooth's son Sweyn Forkbeard and was a staunch supporter of the old pagan faith. Harald Bluetooth had allowed Christian missionaries from the Archbishop of Hamburg-Bremen missionary in Denmark and the king himself was baptized once between 960 and 965. Palnatoke convinced Sweyn to wage war on his father. In the mid-980s, Sweyn revolted against his father and seized the throne. Harald was driven into exile and died shortly afterwards. According to some accounts, Palnatoki himself slew Harald. In addition to religious motives, he may have been taking revenge for the death of his grandfather, Jarl Ottar, who was killed when Harald invaded Götaland.

Saxo Grammaticus relates how Palnatoke (Toko) was forced by King Harald to use a single arrow to shoot an apple from his own son's head as the boy ran downhill. The legendary motif of the great archer forced to shoot an apple from his son's head appears among other Germanic nations, as the story of Egil in the Þiðrekssaga, William of Cloudesley in an English ballad, Hemming Wolf in Holstein, Puncher in an Upper Rhenish legend in Malleus Maleficarum, and most famously William Tell in Switzerland.

The name has been interpreted in two different ways. The first is as an alternate Old Norse patronymic meaning "Palni's (or Palnir's) (son) Tóki". The other is as a nickname meaning "Shaft-Toki" or "Toki the Archer".

== Adaptations ==
Palnatoki was the subject of works by two influential Danish authors of the early nineteenth century. Adam Oehlenschläger wrote a tragedy called Palnatoke in 1809. N. F. S. Grundtvig wrote a tale called Palnatoke in 1804 and in 1809–11 a two-volume work of poetic drama, Optrin af Kæmpelivets Undergang i Nord ("Episodes of the Downfall of the Giants life in the North"), which deals with Palnatoki and Sigurð and was intended as part of a massive poetic work projected to consist of dramatised historic episodes and retellings of sagas spanning a thousand years from the coming of Odin and "Asatru" to Scandinavia through the legends of the Völsungs and Nibelungs until the fall of the Jomsborg with Palnetoki's death, and the victory of Christianity.
