= Lausavísa =

Form of Old Norse and later Icelandic poetry

In Old Norse poetry and later Icelandic poetry, a lausavísa (pl. lausavísur) is a single stanza composition, or a set of stanzas unconnected by narrative or thematic continuity.

Lausavísur are often introduced in the text of sagas with the phrase þá kvað (then said).
