= Jomsvikings =

Order of Viking mercenaries

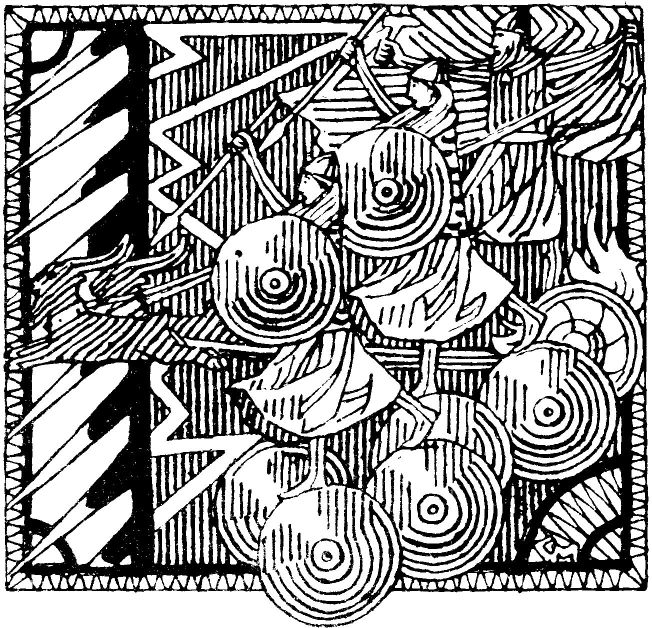
Storm in Hjørungavåg (1899) by Gerhard Munthe

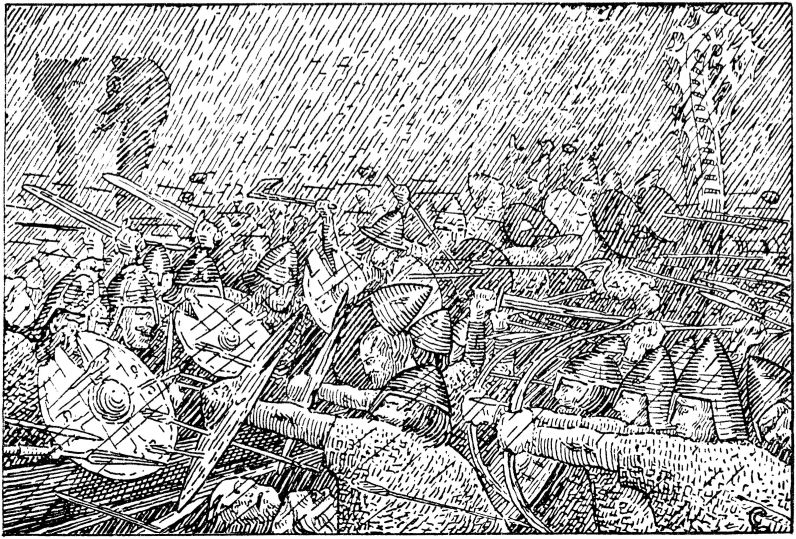
Jomsvikings fighting in a hail storm at the Battle of Hjörungavágr

The Jomsvikings were a legendary order of Viking mercenaries or conquerors of the 10th and 11th centuries. Though reputed to be staunchly dedicated to the worship of the Old Norse gods, they would allegedly fight for any lord who could pay their substantial fees, even if he were Christian. The institution of the Jomsvikings would itself foreshadow those of the later religious and chivalric orders of the Middle Ages.

The legend of the Jomsvikings appears in some of the Icelandic sagas from the 12th and 13th centuries. According to the sagas (particularly the Jómsvíkinga saga, King Olaf Tryggvasson’s Saga, and stories found in the Flatey Book), their stronghold of Jomsborg was located on the southern shore of the Baltic Sea, but its exact location has been disputed by modern historians and archeologists. Jomsborg is also thought by some researchers to be identical with Jumne, Julin and Vineta, which are mentioned in both Danish and German records from the Middle Ages. There is no medieval source that mentions a precise location of Jomsborg except for the disputed Gesta Wulinensis ecclesiae pontificum (at 53°51′50″N 14°43′05″E) that was alleged to have been discovered in the autumn of 2019.

Historians still debate the accuracy of the accounts of the Jomsvikings. Without a conclusively identified location for their headquarters, and because of a lack of primary or contemporary sources specifically mentioning the Jomsvikings or Jomsborg, confirming the tales of their exploits has been difficult. However, there are three contemporary runestones, as well as passages in Old Norse poetry and the lausavísur, that refer to their battles.

== Code ==
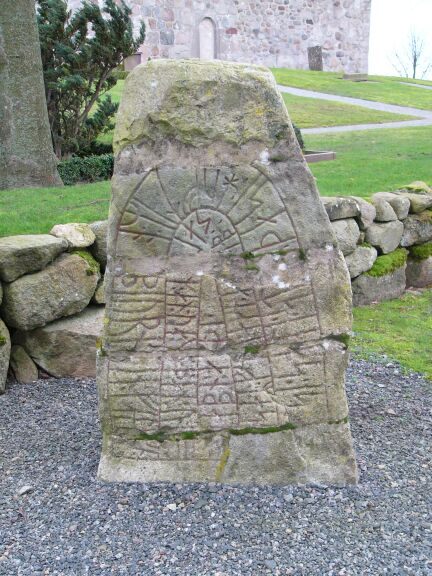
The Sjörup Runestone in Sjörup, Sweden, is generally associated with the Jomsviking attack on Uppsala, the Battle of the Fýrisvellir. It says:Saxi placed this stone in memory of Ásbjörn Tófi's/Tóki's son, his partner. He did not flee at Uppsala, but slaughtered as long as he had a weapon.

The Saga of the Jomsvikings relates that the Jomsvikings were highly selective in deciding whom to admit to their order. Membership was restricted to men of proven valor between 18 and 50 (with the exception of a boy named Vagn Åkesson, who defeated Sigvaldi Strut-Haraldsson in single combat at the age of 12). In order to gain admission, prospective members were required to prove themselves with a feat of strength, which often took the form of a ritual duel, or holmgang, with a Jomsviking.

Once admitted, the Jomsvikings required adherence to a strict code of conduct to instill a sense of military discipline among its members. Any violation of the rules could be punished with immediate expulsion from the order. Each Jomsviking was bound to defend his brothers and to avenge their deaths if necessary. He was forbidden to speak ill of his fellows or to quarrel with them. Blood feuds between members were to be mediated by Jomsviking officers. Jomsvikings were forbidden to show fear or to flee in the face of an enemy of equal or inferior strength, but orderly retreat in the face of vastly-outnumbering forces appears to have been acceptable. All spoils of battle were to be equally distributed among the entire brotherhood. No Jomsviking was permitted to be absent from Jomsborg for more than three days without the permission of the brotherhood. No women or children were allowed within the fortress walls, and none were to be taken captive. It is unclear, however, whether members were forbidden marriage or liaisons with women outside the walls.

== History ==
There are different accounts for the origins of the order. Gesta Danorum (book 10) tells that a settlement named Julinum was conquered by the King of Denmark, Harald Bluetooth, who gave it to the Swedish prince Styrbjörn the Strong. Harald then provided Styrbjörn with a strong force with which Styrbjörn terrorized the seas. The Knýtlinga saga agrees by giving Harald as the founder of the Jomsvikings, but the story of Styrbjörn is not connected to the Jomsvikings. The Jómsvíkinga saga says that the settlement was founded by Palnatoke, receiving the location from the mythical Wendish ruler Burislav. Styrbjarnar þáttr Svíakappa and Eyrbyggja saga agree with all previously mentioned versions by making Styrbjörn take command of the Jomsvikings after they already had been established. Styrbjarnar þáttr Svíakappa also tells that among the Norse there were many men from the "East land" arriving at Jomsborg, suggesting that it was a settlement of mixed ethnicity. Jomsviking chieftains included Palnatok, Styrbjörn the Strong, Sigvaldi Strut-Haraldsson, Thorkell the High, and Hemeng.

Accounts of their size vary. In various sources, Jomsborg was supposed to have held anywhere from 30 to 300 ships in its harbor. However some historians believe Jomsborg was largely a market center with its Danish garrison imposed on the Wends.

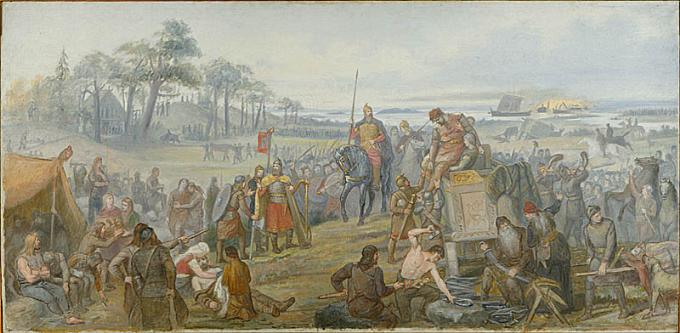
After the Battle of the Fýrisvellir, by Mårten Eskil Winge (1888)

Gesta Danorum (book 10), Styrbjarnar þáttr Svíakappa and Eyrbyggja saga relate that in the early 980s, the exiled Swedish prince Styrbjörn the Strong brought the Jomsvikings to a devastating defeat against Styrbjörn's uncle King Eric the Victorious at the Battle of the Fýrisvellir, Uppsala, in 984 or 985, while trying to take the crown of Sweden by force of arms. The fact that the Jomsvikings lost was attributed to a pact which the Swedish king Eric made with Odin. Three runestones from this time, the Högby Runestone ("the brave champion Asmund fell on the Fyrisvellir"), one of the Hällestad Runestones, labelled DR 295 ("he did not flee at Uppsala"), and the Sjörup Runestone ("He did not flee at Uppsala, but slaughtered as long as he had a weapon"), relate to deaths with honour at Uppsala, probably three Jomsvikings. The battle is also commemorated, in poetry, by the Icelandic skald Þórvaldr Hjaltason, who took part in the battle on the Swedish side. Jómsvíkinga saga tells that in 986, they attacked Haakon Jarl in Norway and were defeated in the Battle of Hjörungavágr. The saga recounts that Jomsvikings captured by the Norwegians and about to be executed exhibited courage and defiance, some being eventually spared by their captors. The Jómsvíkinga saga ends with a brief explanation of the battle's aftermath and, in fact, points to this battle as the beginning of the end for the Jomsvikings.

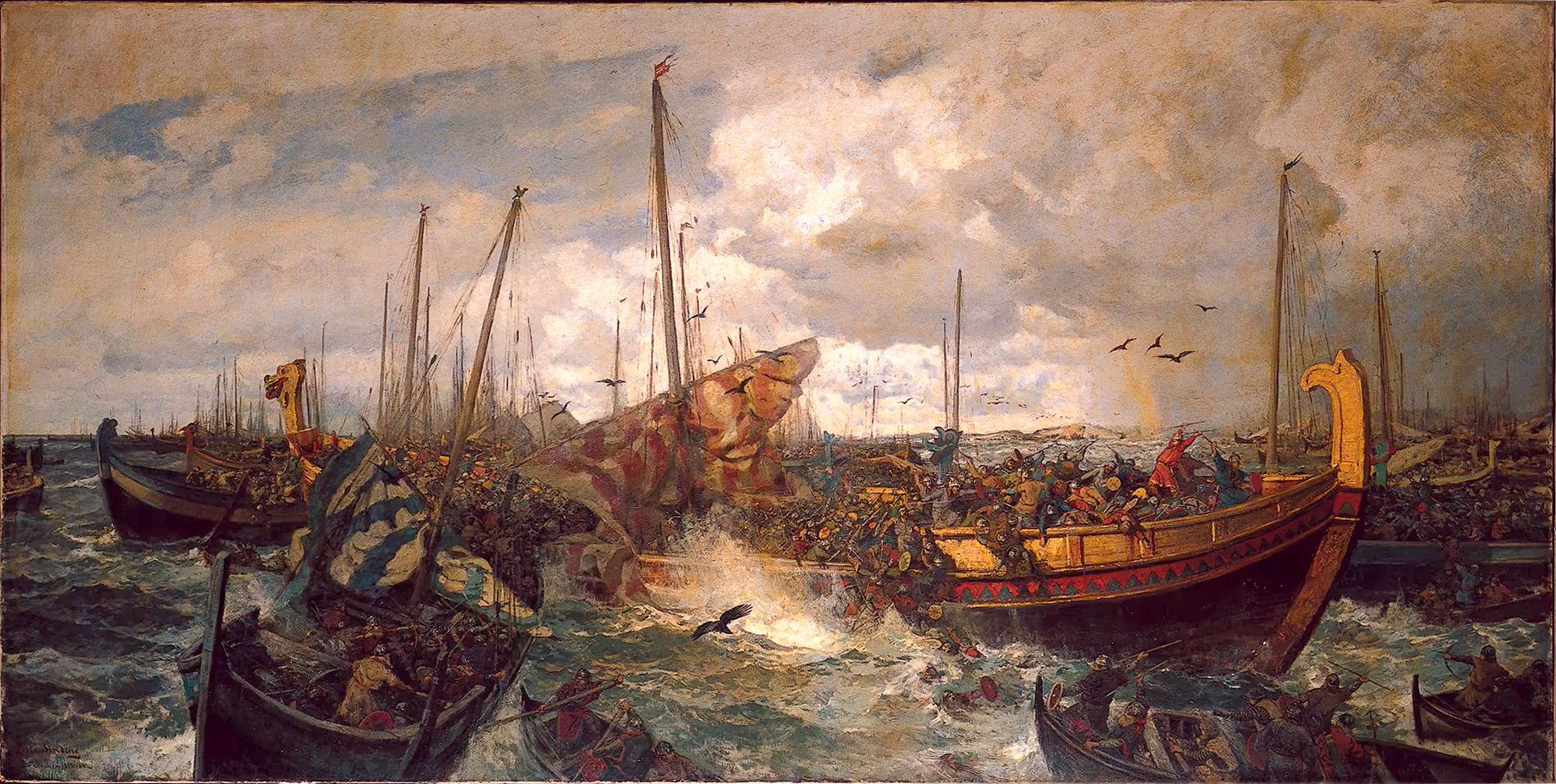
The Battle of Svolder, at which the Jomsvikings fought with Denmark and Sweden against Norway, maybe with a swap of allegiance to side with Forkbeard's advantage, of his 400 ships to Tryggvason's 100. (Otto Sinding painter).

After these two decisive defeats, the power of the Jomsvikings waned, but Olaf Trygvasson's Saga relates that they played a decisive, if treacherous, role in the Battle of Svolder in 1000. At Svolder, a Jomsviking force led by Sigvald Jarl abandoned King Olaf of Norway and joined forces with his enemies to annihilate his fleet. This action may have been intended to fight the Christianization of Scandinavia, which had been forcibly promoted by Olaf. As it happened though, the Danish king Sweyn Forkbeard, who won the Norwegian throne when the sea battle ended, was (at least nominally) a Christian. He and his father, King Harald Bluetooth of Denmark, are reported to have been baptized in 965. Their decline continued over the next few decades.

According to the Heimskringla, King Magnus I of Norway decided to put an end to the Jomsviking threat. As part of consolidating his control of Denmark, he sacked Jomsborg in 1043, destroying the fortress and killing many of its inhabitants.

== Curmsun Disc ==
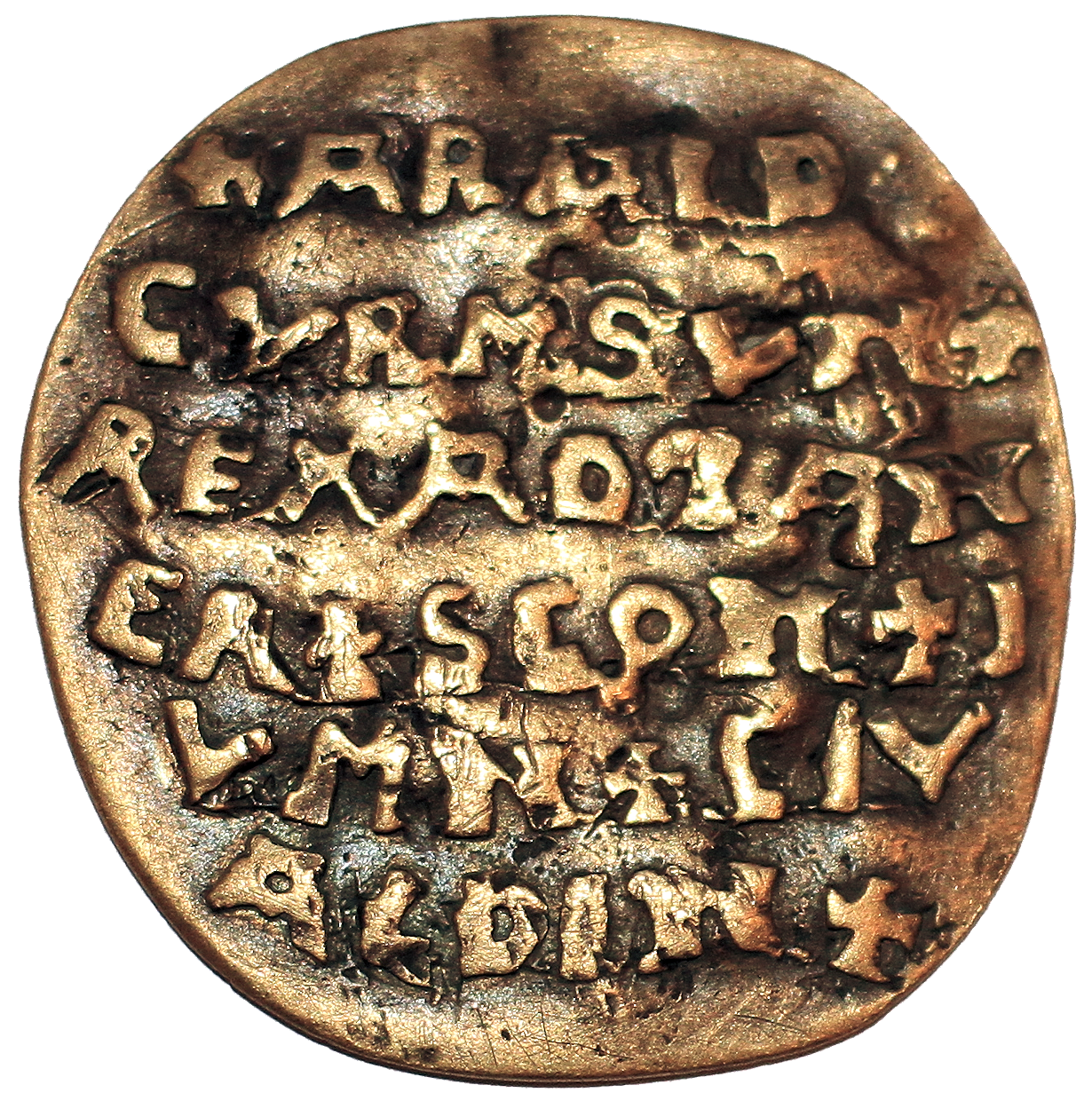
Curmsun Disc - obverse

A golden disc bearing the name of Harald Bluetooth and Jomsvikings stronghold seat Jomsborg was re-discovered in Sweden in autumn 2014. The disc, also called the Curmsun Disc, is made of high gold content and has a weight of 25.23 grams. On the obverse there is a Latin inscription and on the reverse there is a Latin cross with four dots surrounded by an octagonal ridge. The inscription reads: "+ARALD CVRMSVN+REX AD TANER+SCON+JVMN+CIV ALDIN+" and translates as "Harald Gormsson king of Danes, Scania, Jomsborg, diocese of Aldinburg". It is assumed that the disc was a part of a Viking hoard found in 1841 in the Pommeranian village Wiejkowo near the town of Wolin by Heinrich Boldt.

== In fiction ==
- Jomsvikings are the focus of E. R. Eddison's novel Styrbiorn the Strong and Horned Helmet a juvenile historical novel by Henry Treece.
- Fictionalized versions of the Jomsborg (under the name "Jormsvik") and the Jomsvikings appear in Guy Gavriel Kay's novel The Last Light of the Sun, which is set in a fictional world that closely parallels 9th-century Britain and Scandinavia.
- In Tim Severin's Viking series, Thorgils spends time amongst the Jomsvikings, although they are a smaller, older, and weaker force.
- The Long Ships by Frans G. Bengtsson retells an episode from the sagas, where a band of defeated Jomsvikings, about to be executed in Norway, are proud, undaunted and defiant to the end - winning their captors' grudging respect and some of them surviving against all odds.
- The short story The King of Norway by Cecelia Holland, in the anthology Warriors, has at its center the story of the Battle of Hjörungavágr.
- In the manga Vinland Saga by Makoto Yukimura, first published in Japanese in 2006, several of the main characters are based on Jomsvikings from the Sagas, such as Thorkell the High and Canute the Great. The manga depicts them as an elite force under Sven and then Canute during their invasion of England, while trying to keep their waning influence on the court. It is also said that the protagonist Thorfinn's father, Thors, was a Jomsviking until he became a pacifist, fleeing Jomsborg with his wife. The manga has since been adapted into an anime series by Wit Studio and MAPPA.
- In the 2003 Polish film An Ancient Tale: When the Sun Was a God by Jerzy Hoffman, Jomsvikings are portrayed as marauders in the service of the main antagonist Popiel.
- Swedish melodic death metal band Amon Amarth released the album Jomsviking in 2016. The album tells a story set in the world of the Jomsvikings.
- Vikings: Valhalla (2022) has a Jomsviking settlement in today's Pomerania.

== See also ==
- Battle of Svolder
- Canute the Great
- Curmsun Disc
- Eric the Victorious
- Olof Skötkonung
- Heimskringla

== Primary sources ==
This list is not exhaustive:

- Jómsvíkinga saga
- Jómsvíkingadrápa
- Heimskringla
- Styrbjarnar þáttr Svíakappa
- Eyrbyggja saga
- Gesta Danorum
- Olaf Tryggvasson's Saga

== Sources ==
- Hollander, Lee M. (1989). The Saga of the Jomsvikings. University of Texas Press. ISBN 978-0292776234.
- Jones, Gwyn (2001). A History of the Vikings (2d ed.). Oxford Univ. Press. ISBN 978-0192801340.
- Kunkel, O.; K.A. Wilde (1941). Jumne, Vineta, Jomsburg, Julin, Wollin (in German). Stettin.
- Palsson, Hermann (1989). Eyrbyggja Saga. Penguin Classics. ISBN 978-0140445305.
- Sturlason, Snorre (1990). Erling Monsen (ed.). Heimskringla: Or the Lives of the Norse Kings. Dover Publications. ISBN 978-0486263663.

== Related Reading ==
- Larsson, Mats G. (2005) Minnet av vikingatiden: De isländska kungasagorna och deras värld (Stockholm: Atlantis) ISBN 91-7353-065-4
- Halldórsson, Ólafur (2000) Danish Kings and the Jomsvikings in the Greatest Saga of Óláfr Tryggvason (London: Viking Society for Northern Research) ISBN 978-0-903521-47-5
- Chartrand, Rene, Ian Heath, Mark Harrison, Keith Durham (2006) The Vikings: Voyagers of Discovery and Plunder (Osprey Publishing) ISBN 1-84603-087-0
- Schmidt, Roderich (2009) Das historische Pommern. Personen, Orte, Ereignisse (Böhlau Verlag) ISBN 9783412278052
- Thunberg, Carl L. (2012) Slaget på Fyrisvallarna i ny tolkning (CLTS) ISBN 978-91-981859-5-9
