= Haakon Sigurdsson =

De facto ruler of Norway from c. 975–995

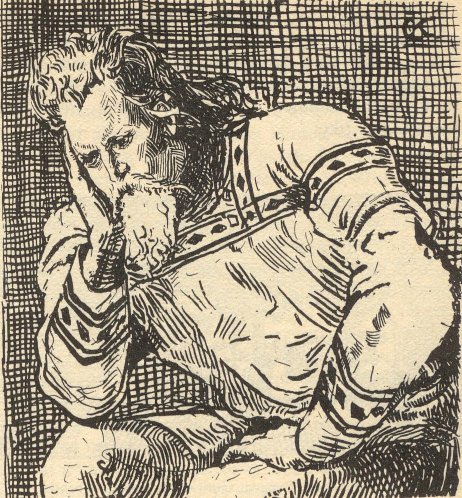
Drawing of Jarl Haakon Sigurdsson by Christian Krohg (1852–1925).

Haakon Sigurdsson (Old Norse: Hákon Sigurðarson [ˈhɑːˌkon ˈsiɣˌurðɑz̠ˌson], Norwegian: Håkon Sigurdsson; c. 937–995), known as Haakon Jarl (Old Norse: Hákon jarl), was the de facto ruler of Norway from about 975 to 995. Sometimes he is styled as Haakon the Powerful (Old Norse: Hákon jarl hinn ríki), though the Ágrip and Historia Norwegiæ give the less flattering name Hákon Illi, that is, Haakon the Bad. He is also known as Hákon Sigurðarson, Earl of Hlaðir.

== Background ==
Haakon was the son of Sigurd Haakonsson, Jarl of Lade and ruler of Trøndelag and Hålogaland. His mother was Bergljot Toresdatter, daughter of Thorir Rögnvaldarson, Jarl of Møre. Adam of Bremen wrote that he was "of the stock of Ivar (either Ivar the Boneless or Ivar Vidfamne) and descended from a race of giants". In the sagas, Haakon claimed descent from the divine lineage of Sæming, son of Odin. The Hakon Jarl Runestones in Sweden may refer to him.

== Reign ==
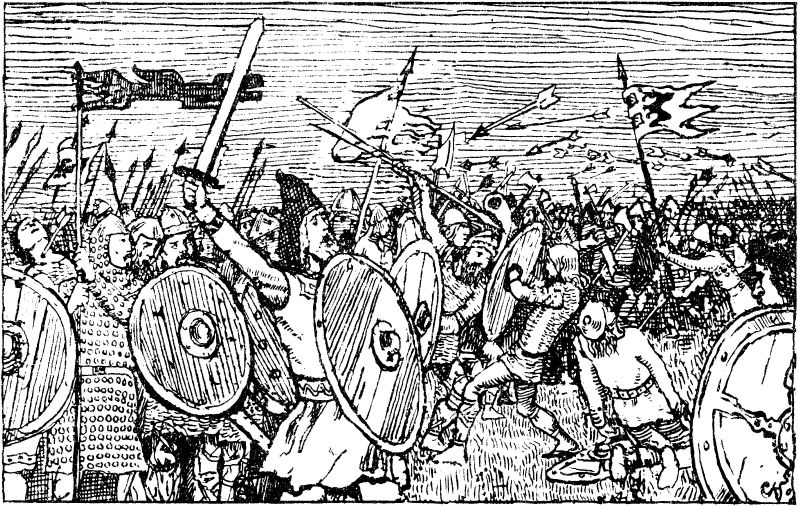
Battle between Haakon Jarl and brothers of Harald Greycloak Christian Krogh (1899)

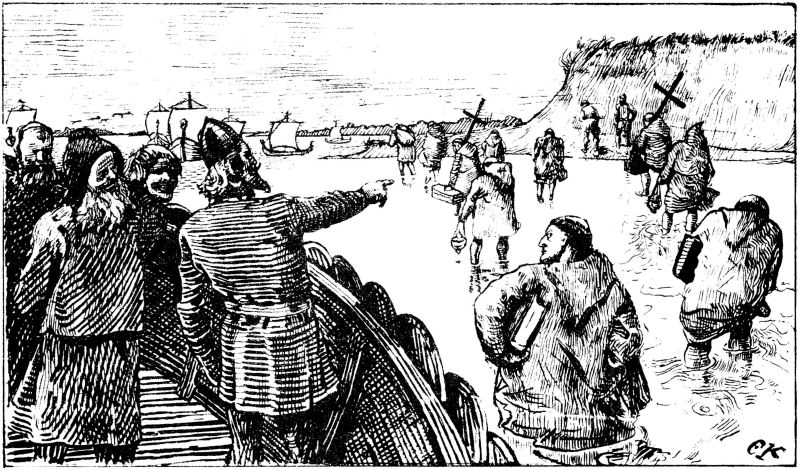
Haakon Jarl commands the clergymen to return ashore Christian Krogh (1899)

Haakon became jarl after his father was killed by King Harald Greycloak's men in 961. Haakon Jarl warred with King Harald for some time, until he was forced to flee to Denmark, where he conspired with Harald Bluetooth against Harald Greycloak.

The two arranged the death of Harald Greycloak around 971, after which Harald Bluetooth invited his foster-son to be invested with new Danish fiefs. Civil war broke out between Haakon Jarl and the surviving brothers of Harald Greycloak, but Haakon proved victorious. Haakon recognised the overlordship of Harald.

Around 973–974, he went to Denmark to help Harald Bluetooth of Denmark in his defense against the Holy Roman Emperor Otto II. Otto's forces successfully opposed an attempt by Harald to throw off the German yoke. After that Haakon paid no taxes to Denmark.

Haakon was a strong believer in the old Norse gods, even after Harald Bluetooth forced him to accept baptism around 975 and assigned him clergymen to take to Norway to spread Christianity. When a favourable wind came for Haakon to leave, he commanded the clergymen to return ashore, and broke his allegiance to Denmark. In 977, Vladimir of Novgorod fled to him, collecting as many of the Viking warriors as he could to assist him to recover Novgorod, and on his return the next year marched against Yaropolk I of Kiev. In 986, a Danish invasion fleet led by the fabled Jomsvikings was defeated at the Battle of Hjörungavágr.

In 995, a quarrel broke out between Haakon and the Trønders just as Olaf Tryggvason, a descendant of Harald Fairhair, arrived. Haakon quickly lost all support, and was killed by his own slave and friend, Tormod Kark, while hiding in the pig sty in the farm Rimul in Melhus. Jarlshola is the location in Melhus thought to have been the hiding place of Haakon Jarl and Tormod Kark on their last night before the infamous murder at Rimul. After his death, Haakon Jarl's two sons Eirik Håkonson and Sveinn Hákonarson fled for protection to the king of Sweden, Olof Skötkonung.

A number of (textually related) sources recount Haakon's predilection for taking women as concubines, whether the daughters of nobles or of commoners; according to Snorri Sturluson: "the jarl had the daughters of powerful men taken and brought home to him, and he slept with them for a week or two and then sent them home, and for that he got much dislike from the kinsmen of the women." (Note: jarl lét taka ríkra manna dœtr ok flytja heim til sín ok lá hjá viku eða tvær, sendi heim síðan, ok fekk hann af því óþokka mikinn af frændum kvinnanna.) This has been suggested to be part of a fertility cult, dedicated to Þorgerðr Hǫlgabrúðr.

== Children ==
- Eric Haakonsson (960s – 1020s), would avenge his father at the Battle of Svolder and then govern Norway with his half-brother, Sveinn Hákonarson
- Sweyn Haakonsson (died c. 1016), co-ruler of Norway
- Aud Haakonsdottir, married the Swedish king Eric the Victorious, according to Yngvars saga víðförla
- Bergljót Haakonsdottir, married Einar Tambarskjelvar
- Sigrid Haakonsdottir, mother of Ivar Hvide, Jarl of Oppland
- Sigurd Haakonsson
- Ragnhild Haakonsdatter
- Erling Haakonsson
- Erland Haakonsson
- Hemming Haakonsson
- Ramvieg Haakonsdatter

== Poets ==
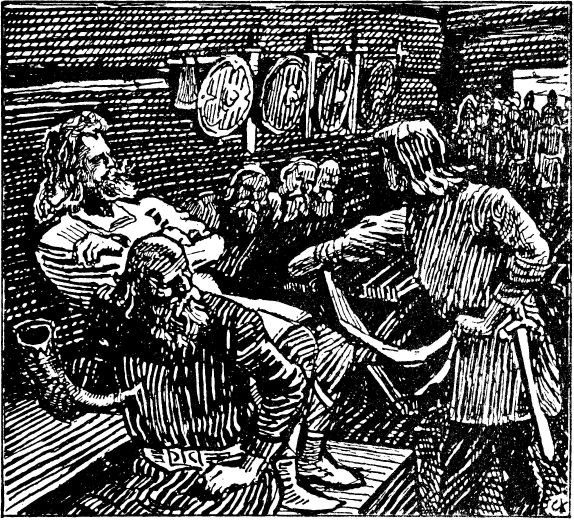
Haakon Jarl received news of victory over the Jomsvikings Christian Krogh (1899)

According to Skáldatal, Haakon had the following poets at his court:

- Eyvindr Finnsson
- Einarr skálaglamm
- Tindr Hallkelsson
- Skafti Þóroddsson
- Þórólfr munnr
- Eilífr Guðrúnarson
- Vigfúss Víga-Glúmsson
- Þorleifr jarlsskáld
- Hvannár-Kálfr

== Korsvikaspillet ==
Haakon Jarl is a central figure in Håkon og Kark which is performed annually at the Korsvikaspillet festival in Korsvika in Trondheim. The play is based on the story of Haakon Jarl and Tormod Kark as portrayed in the Sagas by Snorri Sturluson. The first play was a poetic tableau that was made in connection with the 800-year anniversary of the Lade Church (Lade kirke) in 1989 and repeated two years later. In 1995, Idar Lind wrote a new script. The music is composed by Frode Fjellheim.

== Primary sources ==
Source bases for Haakon Jarl are considerable. He was given coverage in several sagas, including by Snorri Sturluson in Heimskringla, Ágrip af Nóregskonungasögum and more. According to Hallfreðar saga the poet Hallfreðr composed a drápa on the jarl. Several disjoint stanzas by Hallfreðr in Skáldskaparmál are often thought to belong to this otherwise lost poem.

== Oehlenschläger tragedy ==
Haakon Jarl's life also received literary treatment by Danish poet Adam Oehlenschläger, in his tragedy Hakon Jarl, written in six weeks in 1805 during a stay in Halle, after reading Snorri's Heimskringla. The theme is the conflict between paganism and Christianity. There is an English translation by J. C. Lindberg. Oehlenschläger's play later formed the basis for Smetana's symphonic poem Hakon Jarl.

== Notes ==
Haakon Sigurdsson House of Hlaðir Died: 995
Political offices
Preceded by Sigurðr Hákonarson	Jarl of Hlaðir; 962–995	Succeeded by Eiríkr Hákonarson
