= Albani þáttr ok Sunnifu =

Albani þáttr ok Sunnifu, also known as Seljumanna þáttr, is a short tale (þáttr) about the Irish princess Sunniva who, not wishing to marry a heathen king, flees to the Norwegian island of Selje with her brother Albanus and a number of followers. The residents of the island suspect Sunniva and her companions of killing their livestock and ask Jarl Hákon to kill these ‘bandits’. On seeing Jarl Hákon and his men approach, Sunniva and her companions retreat to their caves and pray that God will not allow them to be killed by the evil men. In answer to their prayers, the caves collapse on the group. Their bodies stay buried until discovered by Olaf Tryggvason, who has them exhumed and has a church built in dedication to them. Together with Sörla þáttr, Tóka þáttr Tókasonar, Norna-gests þáttr and Þorsteins þáttr uxafóts, the tale is part of a subgenre of "pagan-contact þættir".

The tale is recorded in Oddr Snorrason's Óláfs saga Tryggvasonar and the later Óláfs saga Tryggvasonar en mesta. Oddr's work was originally composed in Latin and only survives in Old Norse-Icelandic translation. Oddr's work in turn derives from an earlier Latin account, Acta sanctorum in Selio.

Albanus was identified in Norwegian tradition with Saint Alban, to whom the monastery at Selje was dedicated. However, the original dedication to Alban at Selje may not have been to the British saint, but a German saint of the same name.

== Bibliography ==
A full bibliography can be found in Wolf, Kirsten (2013). The legends of the saints in Old Norse-Icelandic prose. Toronto, Buffalo, London: University of Toronto Press. pp. 342–349. ISBN 9781442646216.

=== Óláfs saga Tryggvasonar ===
==== Manuscripts ====
- AM 310 4to
- Stock. Perg. 4to no. 18

==== Editions ====
- Finnur Jónsson, ed. (1932). Saga Ólafs Tryggvasonar af Oddr Snorrason munk. Copenhagen.
- Groth, P., ed. (1985). Saga Olafs konungs Tryggvasonar er ritaði Oddr muncer. Christiania: Grøndahl &Søn. pp. 49–50.
- Guðni Jónsson, ed. (1957). Konunga sögur. Vol. 1/3. Íslendingasaganaútgáfan. pp. 80–85.
- Holtsmark, Anne, ed. (1974). Olav Tryggvasons saga etter AM 310 qv. Oslo: Selskapet til utgivelse av gamle norske håndskrifter.
- Munch, P. A., ed. (1853). Saga Olafs konungs Tryggvasunar: Kong Olaf Tryggvesöns saga forfattet paa latin henimod slutningen af det tolfte arrhundrede af Odd Snorreson. Christiania: Brøgger & Christie. pp. 25–26.

==== Translation ====
- Andersson, Theodore M. (2003). The saga of Olaf Tryggvason by Oddr Snorrason. Islandica. Vol. 52. Ithaca: Cornell University Press. pp. 77–79. ISBN 0801441498.

=== Óláfs saga Tryggvasonar en mesta ===
==== Manuscripts ====
- AM 53 fol.
- AM 54 fol.
- AM 61 fol.
- GKS 1005 fol. (Flateyjarbók)
- Stock. Perg. fol. no. 1 (Bergsbók)

==== Editions ====
- Finnur Jónsson, ed. (1930). Flateyjarbók (Codex Flateyensis: MS No 1005 fol. in the Old Royal Collection in the Royal Library of Copenhagen. Copenhagen: Levin & Munksgaard.
- Lindblad, Gustaf, ed. (1963). Bergsbók: Perg. fol. nr. 1 in the Royal Library, Stockholm. Copenhagen: Rosenhilde and Bagger.
- Ólafur Halldórsson, ed. (1958–61). Ólafs saga Tryggvasonar en mesta. Editiones Arnamagnæanæ, Ser. A. Vol. 1–2. Copenhagen: Munksgaard. pp. 313–322.
- Ólafur Halldórsson, ed. (1982). The great saga of Olaf Tryggvason and Olaf the Saint: AM 61 fol. Copenhagen: Rosenkilde and Bagger.
