= Óláfs saga Tryggvasonar =

Collection of sagas about 10th-century Norwegian king Olaf Tryggvason

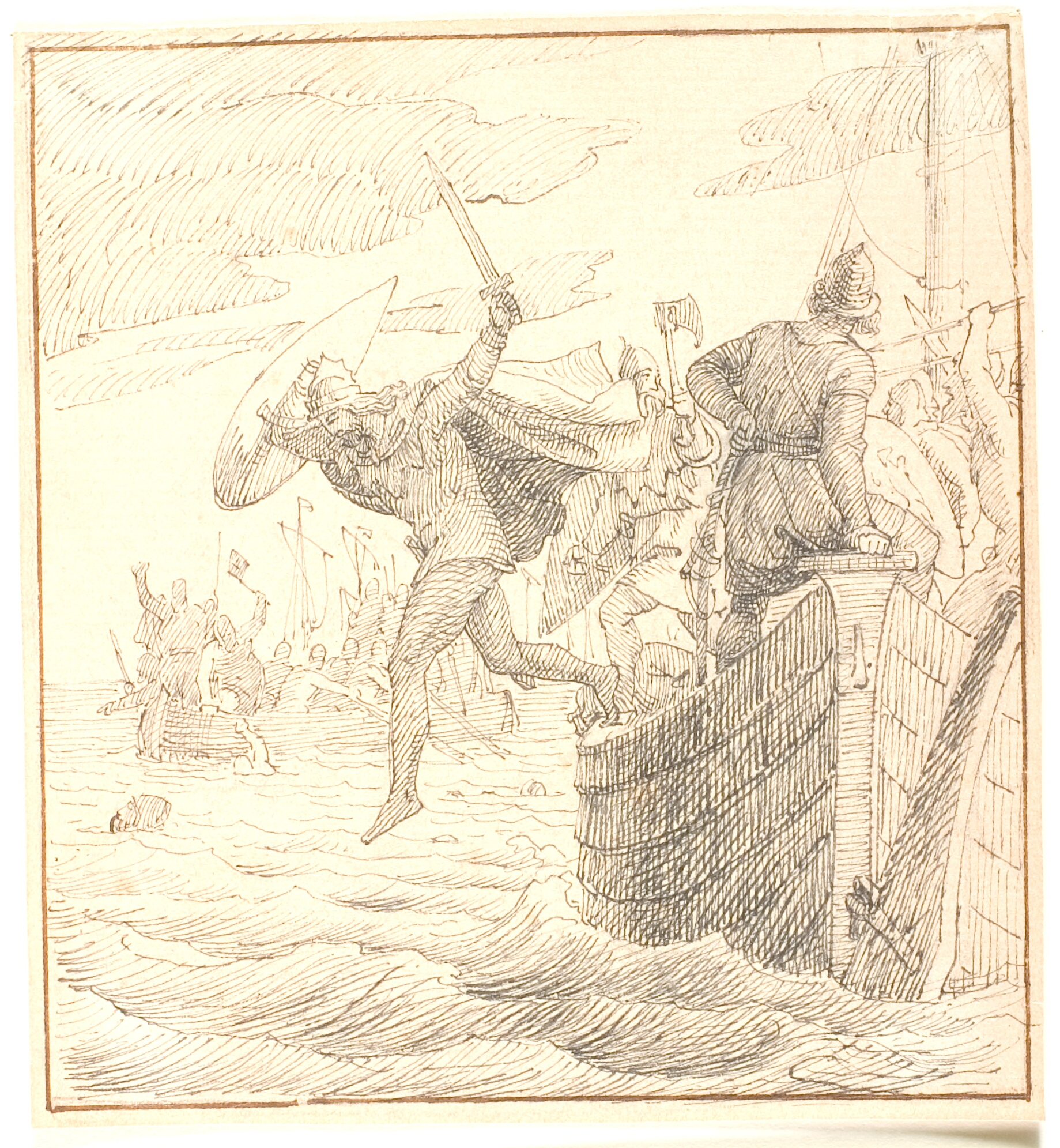
Olaf Tryggvason Jumps Overboard During The Battle of Svolder by Lorenz Frølich

Óláfs saga Tryggvasonar is the name of several kings' sagas on the life of Óláfr Tryggvason, a 10th-century Norwegian king.

Latin lives of Óláfr Tryggvason were written by Oddr Snorrason and by Gunnlaugr Leifsson; both are now lost, but are thought to have formed the basis of Old Norse sagas on his life including in the collection of texts referred to as Heimskringla by scholars. The longest is Óláfs saga Tryggvasonar en mesta (The Greatest Saga of Óláfr Tryggvason), found in the Flateyjarbók, Bergsbók, and other manuscripts.

== Latin ==
=== Oddr Snorrason ===
An account of Óláfr's life was written in Latin in the 12th century by the Benedictine monk Oddr Snorrason. It is considered to be the first full-length Icelandic saga. Oddr made use of previous written works including those of Sæmundr fróði and Ari Þorgilsson as well as Acta sanctorum in Selio and possibly Historia de Antiquitate Regum Norwagiensium. His original work has been lost, but a translation into Old Norse, known as Odds saga munks, is preserved in two nearly complete versions and a fragment of a third. It is difficult to tell how closely the translation reflects the Latin original, but it clearly owes a debt to hagiography, presenting King Óláfr as the apostle to the Norwegians.

=== Gunnlaugr Leifsson ===
Gunnlaugr Leifsson also composed a Latin biography of Óláfr Tryggvason. This work is now lost but it is believed to have been an expansion of that written by his monastic brother, Oddr Snorrason. Snorri Sturluson made use of Gunnlaugr's work when composing his Heimskringla and sections of Gunnlaugr's work were incorporated into Óláfs saga Tryggvasonar en mesta. Some parts are also thought to survive in Vatnsdæla saga.

== Old Norse ==
=== Fagrskinna ===
The saga of Óláfr Tryggvason in the early 13th century Fagrskinna is thought to be based on Oddr Snorrason's.

=== Heimskringla ===
Snorri Sturluson's Heimskringla (c. 1230s) includes an Óláfs saga Tryggvasonar.

=== Óláfs saga Tryggvasonar en mesta ===
Óláfs saga Tryggvasonar en mesta also known as Mesta or the Greatest Saga of Óláfr Tryggvason, is an extended biography of Óláfr Tryggvason compiled around 1300. A version is contained in Flateyjarbók, compiled c. 1390.

It contains detail on Óláfr's conversion to Christianity and of his efforts to convert Norway, including many stories, among them that of the skald Hallfreðr vandræðaskáld. It builds on Snorri Sturluson's saga in Heimskringla and also on Snorri's Óláfs saga helga, with increased narrative detail, including information from both Oddr Snorrason and Gunnlaugr Leifsson's Latin lives, and other works including many þættir, or tales. The writer included from Oddr's account that Óláfr did not die at the Battle of Svolder, but lived to present King Ethelred of England with a book recounting his life and that of seven "other saints".

== See also ==
- Óláfsdrápa Tryggvasonar, poem in the Bergsbók
- The Saga of King Olaf, by Henry Wadsworth Longfellow
