= Grœnlendinga þáttr =

Grœnlendinga þáttr refers to two separate tales (þættir) found in Flateyjarbók:

- Grœnlendinga þáttr (I) ('The Tale of the Greenlanders') – Short story about the exploration of Vinland by Leif Erikson and later Norse explorers.
- Grœnlendinga þáttr (II) ('The Tale of the Greenlanders') or Einars þáttr Sokkasonar ('The Tale of Einarr Sokkason') – Short story set in Greenland, concerning Bishop Arnaldr and the fight over a recently deceased merchant's property.
