= Hulda-Hrokkinskinna =

History of Norwegian kings from 1035 to 1177

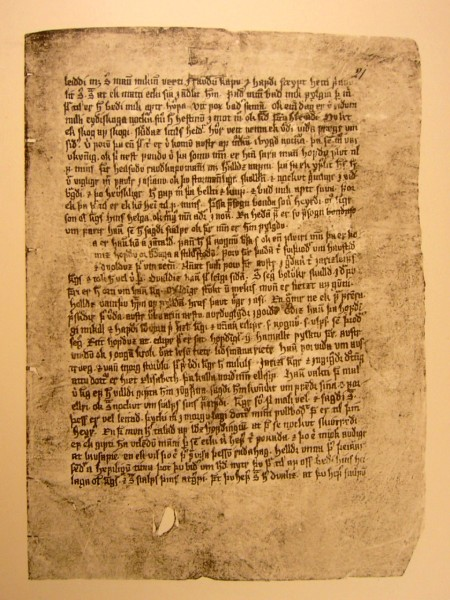
Hulda-Hrokkinskinna

Hulda-Hrokkinskinna is one of the kings' sagas. Written after 1280, it relates the history of the Norwegian kings from Magnús góði, who acceded to the throne in 1035, to Magnús Erlingsson, who died in 1177.

The saga is based on Snorri Sturluson's Heimskringla but supplemented by prose and poetry from a version of Morkinskinna which is no longer extant. Hulda-Hrokkinskinna is especially valuable in places where the preserved Morkinskinna manuscript is defective. It preserves eight verses of skaldic poetry found nowhere else by the poets Arnórr Þórðarson, Þjóðólfr Arnórsson, Bölverkr Arnórsson and Þórarinn stuttfeldr.

The saga is preserved in two manuscripts. Hulda ("the hidden manuscript") or AM 66 fol. is an Icelandic manuscript from the last part of the 14th century. It consists of 142 leaves while the first six (the first quire) are lost. Hrokkinskinna ("wrinkled parchment") or GKS 1010 fol. is an Icelandic manuscript from the beginning of the fifteenth century. Its first 91 leaves contain the text of Hulda-Hrokkinskinna while its last four leaves, added in the 16th century, contain an incomplete version of Hemings þáttr Áslákssonar. The text of Hulda is better than that of Hrokkinskinna.

Hulda-Hrokkinskinna contains a number of þættir.

- Þorgríms þáttr Hallasonar
- Hrafns þáttr Guðrúnarsonar
- Hreiðars þáttr
- Halldórs þáttr Snorrasonar
- Auðunar þáttr vestfirzka
- Brands þáttr örva
- Þorsteins þáttr sögufróða
- Þorvarðar þáttr krákunefs
- Sneglu-Halla þáttr
- Odds þáttr Ófeigssonar
- Stúfs þáttr
- Gísls þáttr Illugasonar
- Ívars þáttr Ingimundarsonar
- Gull-Ásu-Þórðar þáttr
- Þinga þáttr

The text of Hulda-Hrokkinskinna was printed in the sixth and seventh volumes of Fornmanna sögur in 1831 and 1832. As of 2006, the saga has not been published again. The Danish scholar Jonna Louis-Jensen has done extensive work on Hulda-Hrokkinskinna. In 1968, she published a facsimile edition of Hulda and in 1977 a critical analysis of the saga. She has almost completed a new critical edition of the saga.
