= Icelandic annals =

Chronological records of Iceland

Icelandic annals are chronological manuscript records of events mainly of the thirteenth and fourteenth centuries in and around Iceland, though some, like the Oddverjaannáll and the Lögmannsannáll reach the fifteenth century, and the Gottskálks annáll even reaches the seventeenth.

Icelandic annals include:

- Annales vetustissimi or Forni annáll (ca. 1310)
- Konungsannáll, also Annales regii or Þingeyraannáll (ca. 1300–1328)
- Skálholtannáll (ca. 1362), including the Skálholtfragmentet (ca. 1360–1380)
- Lögmannsannáll (1362–1390), including its continuation, Nýi annáll (ca. 1575–1600)
- Flateyjarannáll (ca. 1387–1395)
- Gottskálksannáll (ca. 1550–1660)
- Resensannáll or Annales Reseniani (ca. 1700)
- Oddaverjaannáll (ca. 1540–1591)
