= Ísleifs þáttr biskups =

Ísleifs þáttr biskups (The Tale of Bishop Ísleifr) is a short Old Norse-Icelandic narrative which recounts two episodes from the life of Ísleifr Gizurason, the first bishop of Iceland. The first episode recounts Ísleifr's meeting with St Ólafr in Norway. Ísleifr is introduced to Ólafr by Brandr Vermundarson, who gives Ísleifr a cloak previously gifted to him by the king. The second part of the narrative gives an account of Ísleifr's marriage to Dalla Þorvaldsdóttir.

The þáttr is preserved in Flateyjarbók, where it is interpolated in Óláfs saga helga, in AM 753 fol. no. 5, a now-fragmentary 15th-century vellum manuscript, and AM 554h α 4to., a 17th-century paper copy of AM 753 fol. no. 5.

== Bibliography ==
=== Manuscripts ===
- GkS 1005 fol. (Flateyjarbók) - ca. 1400
- AM 75e fol. no. 5 - 15th century
- MS AM 554h α 4to. - 17th century

=== Editions ===
- Finsson, Hannes (1773). Kristni-saga, sive Historia Religionis Christianæ in Islandiam ntroductæ, nec non Þattr af Isleifi Biskupi, sive Narratio de Isleifo Episcopo. Hafniae [Copenhagen]. pp. 130-141.
- Sigurðsson, Jón; Vigfússon, Guðbrandur (1858–1878). Biskupa sögur. Vol. 1. Copenhagen: Møller. pp. 51-56.
- Vigfússon, Guðbrandur; Unger, C. R. (1860–1868). Flateyjarbók: En Samling af norske Konge-Sagaer med indskudte mindre Fortællinger om Begivenheder i og undenfor Norge samnt Annaler. Vol. 2. Christiania [Oslo]: Malling. pp. 140-142.
- Vigfusson, Gudbrand; York Powell, F. (1879). An Icelandic Prose Reader. Oxford: Clarendon. pp. 148-149. [only includes the account of Íseifr's marriage to Dalla Þorvaldsdóttir]
- Kahle, B. (1905). Kristnisaga, Þáttr Þorvalds ens viðfǫrla, Þáttr Ísleifs biskups Gizurarsonar, Hungrvaka. Altnordische Saga-Bibliothek 11. Halle: Niemeyer. pp. xxii, 83–86.
- Egilsdóttir, Ásdís (2002). "Ísleifs þáttr byskups". Biskupa sögur II. Íslenzk fornrit XVI. Reykjavík: Hið Íslenzka fornritafélag. ISBN 9979-893-16-8.

=== Translations ===
- Finsson, Hannes (1773). Kristni-saga, sive Historia Religionis Christianæ in Islandiam ntroductæ, nec non Þattr af Isleifi Biskupi, sive Narratio de Isleifo Episcopo. Hafniae [Copenhagen]. pp. 130-141. [Latin translation]
- Leith, Mary Charlotte Julia (1894). The Stories of Thorwald the Far-farer and Bishop Isleif. London: Masters. pp. 27–30.
- Letih, Mary Charlotte Julia (1895). Stories of the Bishops of Iceland. London: Masters. pp. 27–30. [Reprint of the above]
- Vigfusson, Gudbrand; York Powell, F (1905). Origines Islandicae: A Collection of the More Important Sagas and Other Native Writings Relating to the Settlement and Early History of Iceland. London: Clarendon. pp. 595-596.
- Loth, Agnete (1989). To islandske bispekrøniker. Odense: Odense Universitetsforlag. [Danish translation]
