= Tale of the Greenlanders =

Tale of the Greenlanders may refer to:

- Grœnlendinga saga
- Grœnlendinga þáttr (I)
- Grœnlendinga þáttr (II)/Einars þáttr Sokkasonar
