= Brandkrossa þáttr =

Brandkrossa þáttr (The Tale of Brandkrossi) is a short Old Norse tale (þáttr) which serves as a prologue to Droplaugarsona saga. Whereas Droplaugarsona saga details the descendants of Helgi Droplaugarson, Brandkrossa þáttr focuses on the forebears of his enemy Helgi Asbjarnarson, including his father Asbjorn, son of Hrafnkel, the subject of Hrafnkels saga. Although beginning with Hrafnkel, the author of Brandkrossa þáttr does not appear to have known Hrafnkels saga and used a version of Landnámabók as a source instead. The þáttr takes its name from Brandkrossi, an ox owned by Grímr, ancestor of the sons of Droplaug.

The þáttr falls into two part, the second of which is more fantastic. One day Grímr's ox Brandkrossi flies into a rage and swims out to sea. Grímr travels to Norway where he meets Geitir, whose father was a troll. Grímr marries Geitir's daughter Droplaug, and it is revealed that it was Geitir who caused Brandkrossi to disappear. Geitir sends Grímr away with many gifts including the hide of Brandkrossi stuffed with grain. A version of this episode is told in Fljótsdæla saga and has parallels with the giant episodes in Kjalnesinga saga and Hálfdanar þáttr svarta.

The þáttr survives in paper manuscripts, the earliest from the 17th century, all of which stem from a now lost manuscript. Finlay suggests that as Brandkrossa þáttr is likely to have been associated with Droplaugarsona saga in manuscripts, the source for these paper copies is probably AM 162c fol, a single leaf which contains a fragment of Droplaugarsona saga.

== Bibliography ==
=== Manuscripts ===
- JS 435 4to
- Thott 1768 4to
- AM 164k fol

=== Editions ===
- Gudbrand Vigfusson; Powell, F. York (1905). "Helgana saga". Origines Islandicae: A collection of the more important sagas and other native writings relating to the settlement and early history of Iceland. Vol. 2. Oxford: Clarendon Press. pp. 533–536.
- Jóhannesson, Jón (1950). "Brandkrossa þáttur". Austfirðinga sögur. Íslenzk fornrit. Vol. XI. Reykjavík: Hið íslenska fornritafélag. pp. 183–191. ISBN 9979-893-11-7.

=== Translations ===
- Gudbrand Vigfusson; Powell, F. York (1905). "Helgana saga". Origines Islandicae: A collection of the more important sagas and other native writings relating to the settlement and early history of Iceland. Vol. 2. Oxford: Clarendon Press. pp. 533–536.
- Bachman, W. Bryant Jr. (1992). "The Story of Brandkrossa". Forty Icelandic Tales. Lanham, Maryland; London: University Press of America. pp. 277–282. ISBN 0-8191-8499-3.
- Waggoner, Ben (2010). Sagas of Giants and Heroes. New Haven, Connecticut: Troth Publications. pp. 65–73. ISBN 978-0-578-05933-4.
