= Þiðranda þáttr ok Þórhalls =

Þiðranda þáttr ok Þórhalls ("the story of Þiðrandi and Þórhall") or Þiðranda þáttr Síðu-Hallssonar ("the story of Þiðrandi, son of Hall of Sida") is a short tale (or þáttr) preserved within the Saga of Olaf Tryggvason in Flateyjarbók. It tells how Þiðrandi, Hall of Sida's virtuous and humble eighteen-year-old son, ignores the warning of his father's friend Þórhall spámaðr (Thorhall Seer or the Prophet) at a Winter Nights feast that a spámaðr is fated to die, and that in particular something terrible will happen if anyone goes outside that night; he responds to the third summons at the door, thinking it shameful that guests should be ignored, whereupon he sees nine women in black with drawn swords riding into the homefield from the north and nine women in light clothes and on white horses riding from the south, and is killed by those in black. Þórhall interprets them to Hall as the fylgjur of his family, or dísir, the black-clad ones angry at the impending change of faith in Iceland and the light-clothed willing but as yet unable to defend Þiðrandi. Later, Þórhall is again staying with Hall and wakes smiling because he has seen through the window that the hills have opened and the living creatures, great and small, are preparing to move out in anticipation of the coming of Christianity.

== Sources ==
- Flateyjarbók, ed. Guðbrandur Vigfússon, Carl Rikard Unger, 3 vols., vol. 1 Christiania: Mallings, 1860, "Ólafs Saga Tryggvasonar" ch. 335, "Fra Þiðranda," pp. 419–21
- "Þiðranda þáttur ok Þórhalls" on is.wikisource (modernized Icelandic)
