= Hallar-Steinn =

Icelandic poet

Hallar-Steinn (Old Norse: [ˈhɑlːɑr-ˌstɛinː]; Modern Icelandic: [ˈhatlar-ˌsteitn̥]) was an Icelandic poet active around the year 1200. He is best known for the poem Rekstefja, preserved in Bergsbók and Óláfs saga Tryggvasonar en mesta. A few other disjoint verses by him are also known, quoted in Skáldskaparmál, Laufás-Edda and the Third Grammatical Treatise.

Rekstefja (O.N.: [ˈrekˌstevjɑ]; M.I.: [ˈrɛkˌstɛvja]) traces the career of King Óláfr Tryggvason from his upbringing in Russia to his fall at Svöldr. It consists of 35 dróttkvætt verses. The poem's name derives from its refrain (Old Norse stef) which consists of three lines divided between three contiguous verses. The poem proclaims itself to be the third drápa on Óláfr Tryggvason, referring to two earlier ones by Hallfreðr vandræðaskáld and the unknown Bjarni. The poem is technically accomplished and makes use of complex combinations of kennings. It is influenced by the works of Arnórr jarlaskáld and Einarr Skúlason and has many similarities with Óláfsdrápa Tryggvasonar, preserved in the same manuscript.

No biographical information on Hallar-Steinn has come down to us. His name may be derived from the farm-name Höll in Þverárhlíð in Borgarfjörður. He was identified by some early commentators with the 11th century court poet Steinn Herdísarson but this is rejected by modern scholars.
