= Þáttr =

Form of Norse short story

The þættir (Old Norse singular þáttr, literally meaning a "strand" of rope or yarn) are short stories written mostly in Iceland during the 13th and 14th centuries.

The majority of þættir occur in two compendious manuscripts, Morkinskinna and Flateyjarbók, and within them most are found as digressions within kings' sagas. Sverrir Tómasson regards those in Morkinskinna, at least, as exempla or illustrations inseparable from the narratives that contain them, filling out the picture of the kings' qualities, good and bad, as well as adding comic relief.

== Íslendinga þættir ==
The short tales of Icelanders or Íslendinga þættir focus on Icelanders, often relating the story of their travels abroad to the court of a Norwegian king.

List of short tales:

- Albani þáttr ok Sunnifu
- Arnórs þáttr jarlaskálds
- Auðunar þáttr vestfirzka
- Bergbúa þáttr
- Bolla þáttr Bollasonar
- Brandkrossa þáttr
- Brands þáttr örva
- Draumr Þorsteins Síðu-Hallssonar
- Egils þáttr Síðu-Hallssonar
- Einars þáttr Skúlasonar
- Eiríks þáttr rauða
- Geirmundar þáttr
- Gísls þáttr Illugasonar
- Grœnlendinga þáttr (I)
- Grœnlendinga þáttr (II)/Einars þáttr Sokkasonar
- Gull-Ásu-Þórðar þáttr
- Gunnars þáttr Þiðrandabana
- Halldórs þáttr Snorrasonar inn fyrri
- Halldórs þáttr Snorrasonar inn síðari
- Hallfreðar þáttr vandræðaskálds
- Hauks þáttr hábrókar
- Hrafns þáttr Guðrúnarsonar
- Hreiðars þáttr
- Hrómundar þáttr halta
- Íslendings þáttr sögufróða
- Ívars þáttr Ingimundarsonar
- Jökuls þáttr Búasonar
- Kjartans þáttr Ólafssonar
- Kristni þáttr
- Kumlbúa þáttr
- Mána þáttr skálds
- Odds þáttr Ófeigssonar
- Orms þáttr Stórólfssonar
- Óttars þáttr svarta
- Rauðs þáttr hins ramma
- Rauðúlfs þáttr
- Rögnvalds þáttr ok Rauðs
- Sneglu-Halla þáttr
- Steins þáttr Skaptasonar
- Stefnis þáttr Þorgilssonar
- Stjörnu-Odda draumr
- Stúfs þáttr inn meiri
- Stúfs þáttr inn skemmri
- Svaða þáttr ok Arnórs kerlingarnefs
- Sveins þáttr ok Finns
- Þiðranda þáttr ok Þórhalls
- Þorgríms þáttr Hallasonar
- Þorleifs þáttr jarlaskálds
- Þormóðar þáttr
- Þorsteins þáttr Austfirðings
- Þorsteins þáttr forvitna
- Þorsteins þáttr Síðu-Hallssonar
- Þorsteins þáttr skelks
- Þorsteins þáttr stangarhöggs
- Þorsteins þáttr sögufróða
- Þorsteins þáttr tjaldstœðings
- Þorsteins þáttr uxafóts
- Þorvalds þáttr tasalda
- Þorvalds þáttr víðförla
- Þorvarðar þáttr krákunefs
- Þórarins þáttr Nefjólfssonar
- Þórarins þáttr ofsa
- Þórarins þáttr stuttfeldar
- Þórhalls þáttr knapps
- Ævi Snorra goða
- Ögmundar þáttr dytts (also known as Gunnars þáttr helmings)
- Ölkofra þáttr

== Legendary þættir ==
- Ásbjarnar þáttr Selsbana
- Helga þáttr ok Úlfs
- Helga þáttr Þórissonar
- Norna-Gests þáttr
- Ragnarssona þáttr
- Sörla þáttr
- Tóka þáttr Tókasonar
- Völsa þáttr
- Þorsteins þáttr bæjarmagns

== Other þættir ==
- Brenna Adams byskups
- Eindriða þáttr ok Erlings
- Eymundar þáttr hrings
- Eymundar þáttr af Skörum
- Hálfdanar þáttr svarta
- Haralds þáttr grenska
- Haralds þáttr hárfagra
- Hemings þáttr Áslákssonar (two versions)
- Hróa þáttr heimska
- Ísleifs þáttr byskups
- Knúts þáttr hins ríka
- Orkneyinga þáttr
- Otto þáttr keisara
- Ólafs þáttr Geirstaðaálfs
- Styrbjarnar þáttr Svíakappa

== Translations ==
- Waggoner, Ben (2010). Sagas of Giants and Heroes. New Haven, CT: Troth Publications. ISBN 978-0578059334. (Tale of Halfdan the Black, 1–11; Tale of Hauk High-Breeches, pp. 11–20; Tale of Jokul Buason, pp. 53–64; Tale of Brindle-Cross, pp. 65–72)
