= Grega saga =

Old Norse chivalric saga

Grega saga is an Old Norse chivalric saga known only from a manuscript that survives as a single leaf: AM 567 XXVI 4to. As it has no known exemplar, it is considered to be an original Old Norse composition. The saga uses motifs found in Ívens saga and Þiðreks saga: a grateful lion becomes Grega's companion and kills three giants. The leaf was written by Magnús Þórhallsson, who worked on Flateyjarbók with Jón Þórðarson.
