= Annales vetustissimi =

Medieval Icelandic manuscript

Annales vetustissimi (from Latin "most ancient annals"), also known as Forni annalli, Forniannáll, or Forni annill is a medieval Icelandic manuscript. It was written until the 14th century; its content spans the birth of Christ until the year 1318. It is archived as manuscript AM 415 4.º (c. 1310). Annales Vetustissimi contains an entry in 1285 that corresponds to one in Flateyjarannáll which has been interpreted as a clear reference to the Americas.

== Bibliography ==
Eldbjørg Haug, The Icelandic Annals as Historical Sources, 1997
