= The Tale of Halldor Snorrason II =

Tale from Icelandic sagas

The Tale of Halldor Snorrason II (Old Norse: Halldórs þáttr Snorrasonar inn síðari; Icelandic: Halldórs þáttur snorrasonar hinn síðari) is the second Icelandic þættir of Halldor Snorrason. A friend and naval commander of King Harald, ancestor of Snorri Sturluson and son of Snorri the Godi, Halldor Snorrason II tells the tale of the conflict between him and King Harald. The text is found in the Morkinskinna.

== Plot synopsis ==
Halldor Snorrason is a friend of King Harald since before his reign, when he was in Constantinople's Varangian Guard. Halldor enters into the service of King Harald after he takes kingship. The tale begins as Halldor wishes to travel home to Iceland but is too poor. King Harald gifts him a ship. When Halldor is unable to staff the ship, King Harald lies about war breaking out with King Sweyn II of Denmark to allow Halldor to recruit men for his journey.

He sails for Iceland and returns a year later. King Harald later insults Halldor's drinking abilities and his devotion to the king as an attempt to disguise the aging alcohol tolerance of a fellow follower, Thorir the England-Trader. Halldor is once again insulted, at Yule, when bribed bell-ringers force a breach of etiquette, for which Halldor is forced to sit in straw and drink a forfeit-cup. He refuses initially, but King Harald eventually forces Halldor after he insults the king. Halldor later that evening accuses the king of payment in impure silver.

After Yule, King Harald commands Halldor to join him on his ship, which he crashes while King Harald attempts to confute Halldor's orders. Halldor threatens to leave the kings service, but Bard, a fellow companion and voice of reason, is able to convince Halldor to say if the king grants him his payment in pure silver and his own ship, rewards well above the Halldor's social status.

The owner of the ship, Svein, disapproves of the king's orders and steals it back. Halldor regains control of the ship. King Harald purchases the ship from Harald to give back to Svein to end the conflict. All but one half a gold mark is paid. As spring approaches, Halldor wishes to leave King Harald, but the king will not pay the half mark owed. Halldor wakes the king and queen, with sword drawn at his throat, demanding the gold. Harald suggests that he come back tomorrow and he'll have the money. Refusing the offer, Halldor demands the queen's ring. Harald suggest that he get a scale so that the ring can be weighed. The queen insults his stinginess and gives Halldor the ring.

Halldor flees to Iceland. The following season, he receives a message to rejoin the king's court stating that "he will have a higher place than any man of low birth". Halldor interprets this as a reference to a hanging and refuses.

== Interpretations and implications ==
=== Icelandic Norwegian relations ===
Although the þættir has been used to argue the link between the Icelandic and Norwegian identity, Throughout the tale Halldor is treated as, and definitively referred to as, a man of low birth, despite being the son of one of the most powerful Icelandic families. This suggests that Norwegians thought Icelanders of low status.

=== Characterization of King Harald ===
The tale states directly, King Harald distrusted Halldor because of his strength of character, especially when he was commanding other men. This suggests that King Harald was either envious or mistrustful of him. The þættir has been used to further characterize King Harald, specifically his erratic views on money.

=== Halldor Snorrason’s legacy ===
It has been suggested that Halldor's close relation with King Harald resulted in the passing of family traditions, about the ruler, from generation to generation, providing the basis of Snorri Sturluson's knowledge of King Harald resulting in King Harald's saga as we know it.
