= The Tale of the Story-Wise Icelander =

Íslendings þáttr sögufróða (The Tale of the Story-Wise Icelander) is a very short þáttr about a young Icelandic storyteller at king Haraldr Sigurðarson's court. This þáttr, which may have been written at the end of the 13th century, was preserved in the Morkinskinna, Hulda and Hrokkinskinna manuscripts.

A young Icelander was given the job of entertaining the members of king Haraldr Sigurðarson's hirð by telling them sagas. He fulfilled his task very well and was rewarded. But as jól approached, he got sad. The king soon found out why: the Icelander had told all the stories he knew but one, which related Haraldr's expeditions abroad, that he did not dare to tell. But the king ordered him to tell it during jól feast. After hearing it, the king said that he had appreciated the saga, which was faithful to the events. He asked him how he knew it. The Icelander answered that he had learnt it from Halldórr Snorrason, who had been one of Haraldr's travelling companions.

It was suggested that Íslendings þáttr sögufróða may have been included in Morkinskinna in order to authenticate the account of Haraldr's travels abroad.
