= Konungsannáll =

Icelandic manuscript

Konungsannáll (from Old Norse, King's Annals, or Latin Annales Islandorum regii), also known as Þingeyraannáll, is a medieval Icelandic manuscript written around the middle of the 14th century. The Icelandic annals are used as a chronological reference for Árna saga Þorlákssonar, the saga of Bishop Árni Þorláksson.

Konungsannáll is preserved as manuscript GKS 2087 4.º (c. 1300–1328).

== Bibliography ==
- Heinrich Buergel Goodwin (1904), Konungsannáll, "Annales Islandorum regii": Beschreibung der Handschrift, Laut- und Formenlehre, als Einleitung zu einem diplomatarischen Abdruck des Cod. reg. 2087, 4te, Gamle samling der Kgl. bibliotek zu Kopenhagen, Druck von R. Oldenbourg (ed.)
- Eldbjørg Haug, The Icelandic Annals as Historical Sources, 1997
