= Grœnlendinga þáttr (II) =

Medieval Icelandic tale

Grœnlendinga þáttr ('The Tale of the Greenlanders') or Einars þáttr Sokkasonar ('The Tale of Einarr Sokkason') is a short medieval Icelandic tale (þáttr). It is preserved in the manuscript Flateyjarbók, towards the end of the second half of the manuscript which was written by Magnús Þórhallsson. The author of the tale itself is unknown. The tale takes place in Greenland, but unlike Grœnlendinga þáttr (I), it makes no mention of Vinland.

In the tale, Einarr Sokkason brings a priest, Arnaldr, to Greenland from Norway to be Bishop of Greenland. Around this time, a Norwegian merchant named Arnbjörn sets off for Greenland, but is wrecked and his ship later found in a firth. Arnbjörn’s kinsmen sail to Greenland and request his recovered property. The bishop refuses this, leading to feud between the two groups. A battle occurs in which men from both sides are killed, including Einarr Sokkason.
