= The Tale of Thorstein Shiver =

The Tale of Thorstein Shiver (Icelandic: Þorsteins þáttur skelks) is an Icelandic þáttur (pl. þættir) about the conversion of the Nordic countries to Christianity. The þáttur tells the humorous tale of Thorstein Thorkelsson's encounter with a demon and how he earns his nickname. The þáttur is contained in the Flateyjarbók. The story's status as a þáttur has been questioned.

== Plot synopsis ==
After refusing an order from King Olaf not to go to the bathroom at night alone, Thorstein finds a demon in the restroom. Thorstein engages it in conversation, asking the demon's name. The demon claimed to be Thorkel the Thin, who supposedly died on the battlefield against a king named Harald Wartooth. Thorstein then asks “Who fares best in Hell?”. The demon answers Sigurd Fafnisbani, who is both a kindler and kindling of the flames of Hell. Thorstein asks “Who fares the worst”. The demon answers Starkad the Old who is submerged up to his ankles in fire, face first. He cries the loudest of everyone in Hell. Thorstein asks the demon thrice to replicate the Starkad's cry. Each time the demon is louder, and Thorstein wraps more of his clothes around his head. Each time Thorstein passes out. After the third cry, the church bell rings, and the demon runs off. It is revealed that asking the demon to replicate the cry was an attempt to wake the others, which succeeded as King Olaf awoke and rang the bell. When asked if he was scared, Thorstein responds stating he was not scared but he shivered once. He was then nicknamed Thorstein Shiver.

== Interpretations and implications ==
=== Hell's reality ===
It has been argued that the purpose of the story is to confer, in the eyes of the pagans, that hell is real. Nordic paganism view on Hel was radically different than the Catholic interpretation of Hell, as a place of torture. It has been suggested that the demon's description of the torture of the famous pagan heroes depicts hell as both a place of active torment, and where all pagans will suffer despite their actions.

=== Nordic hero dichotomy ===
It is suggested that there are in fact two distinct hero types in the sagas. Those who embrace traditional (from the 9th-10th century) pagan values who are violent, strong, powerful and always win, and those who embrace more modern (from the 13th century) values who are wise, even tempered and bring peace. The differing punishments between Starkad and Sigurd has been suggested to be a self-acknowledgment of the difference.

=== Depictions of Olaf Tryggvason ===
Olaf Tryggvason is depicted as protecting those who trust in him, from the devil. King Olaf was in the process of converting the Nordic Countries to Catholicism in many of the sagas. The Tale of Thorstein Shiver has been used to express the "happy necessity of the conversion" attitude depicted towards Olaf and Christianity in the sagas, both as a good thing and none-optional. The story and other þættir have been used to portray the changing views of Olaf as an all-powerful ruler to, as Christianity becomes more established, God as the all-powerful one.

=== Draugr ===
There are those who suggest that the demon is in fact a Draugr, a mythological Nordic animated corpse. As such, the tale can be argued as bridging the gap between pagan and Christian cultures by depicting and incorporating classical Nordic folk-monsters as true catholic demons. A similar interpretation has been given to the Nordic Puki, a small demon-like creature.

=== The boy who learned fear ===
"The Story of the Youth Who Went Forth to Learn What Fear Was" has been argued to be based on or strongly influenced by this þáttur.
