= Flatey, Breiðafjörður =

Island in Breiðafjörður, Iceland

Flatey
- Location within Iceland

Geography
- Location: Breiðafjörður
- Coordinates: 65°22′34″N 22°54′43″W
- Area: 0.5 km^{2} (0.19 sq mi)

Administration
- Iceland
- Constituency: Northwest
- Region: Vestfirðir
- Municipality: Reykhólahreppur

Demographics
- Languages: Icelandic
- Ethnic groups: Icelanders

Additional information
- Time zone: WET (UTC+0)

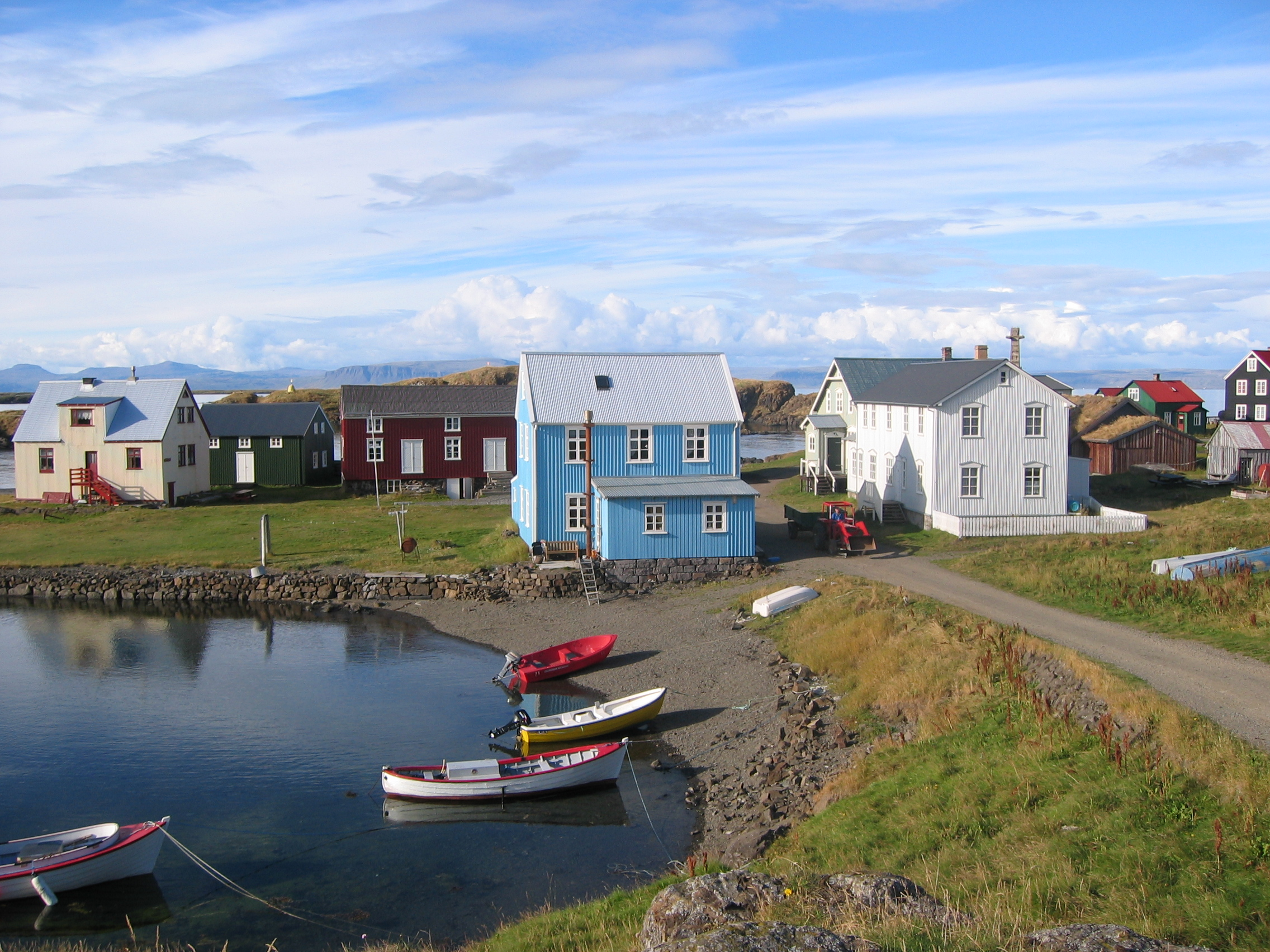
The village in Flatey

Flatey (Icelandic pronunciation: [ˈflaːtˌeiː]) is an island of the western islands, a cluster of about forty large and small islands and islets located in Breiðafjörður on the northwestern part of Iceland. Flatey and its surrounding islands are believed to have formed under the weight of a great glacier during the previous Ice age. In terms of size, Flatey is some two kilometers long and about one kilometer wide, of which most is flat land (hence its name, meaning "flat island" in Icelandic), with scarcely any hills to be found.

== Population ==
The island is seasonally inhabited; most houses there are occupied only during summer. In winter, the island's total population is as many as six people. In the past, Flatey was one of the main cultural centres of Iceland, with its no-longer existing monastery (founded in 1172) standing on the highest point of the island as its beacon of knowledge. In the middle of the 19th century, Flatey was still a cultural and artistic centre and doubled as hub of commerce for the northwest, having received its town charter from the Danish crown in 1777.

From 1777 and on until around the latter part of the last century, Flatey enjoyed a healthy growth of its population and was for a long time, relative to size, massively populated.

Due to social change and changes of production and ensuing change of values and demands in the work place, its steady population has dwindled down to the minimum needed to support the community. During the summer and holidays, the community multiplies in size due to an influx of second home owners, regular domestic visitors and foreign tourists.

== Geography ==
The island has only a single road, which leads from the ferry dock to the so-called "old village", which consists of some restored and traditionally-painted old houses of the island's original inhabitants. There is also the old harbour, from where besides visitors and inhabitants travelling to and fro, the island's sheep are taken over to the mainland for slaughter. Besides sheep, most of Flatey's natural life consists of various kinds of mostly migratory birds, especially Atlantic puffins.

Flatey also has a church, built in 1926. The church's interior is painted with scenes of the island life, made by the Catalan painter Baltasar Samper in the 1960s in return for free accommodation when he was visiting the island. The island also contains the oldest and smallest library in Iceland, established in 1864. This library was once home to the Flatey Book, the largest of medieval Icelandic manuscripts.

== See also ==
- Flateyjarbók
