= Hreiðars þáttr =

Hreiðars þáttr heimska or the Tale of Hreiðarr the Fool is one of the short tales of Icelanders. It tells of Hreiðarr, an apparently mentally disabled Icelandic man who travels to Norway in the time of the joint rule of the kings Magnús góði and Haraldr harðráði. Hreiðarr befriends Magnús with his eccentric behaviour but incurs the wrath of Haraldr when he kills one of his courtiers.

The story is preserved as a part of Morkinskinna and its derivative, Hulda-Hrokkinskinna, but it may originally have existed as a separate written work. It is believed to be among the oldest stories of its kind, perhaps originally composed around 1200 and no later than the mid-13th century. The language archaisms are a feature that characterises Hreiðarr's speech particularly, implying an intentional attempt on the side of the author to giving Hreiðarr a 'rustic' feel. Although the story is realistic and plausible, it is believed to be fictitious.

Hreiðarr's character is portrayed as a strong-minded Icelander who refuses to entirely conform to the social conventions of the Norwegian court. In this, his personal story could be seen as reflecting the collective experience of Icelanders abroad. While Hreiðarr has been discussed in the context of intellectual disability, it is also a likely interpretation that his actions reflect that of a prototype for court jester, or trickster.
