= Hallfreðar saga =

Icelandic saga

Hallfreðar saga vandræðaskálds (Icelandic pronunciation: [ˈhatl̥frɛðar ˈsaːɣa ˈvantrai̯ðaˌskau̯lts], Old Norse pronunciation: [ˈhalːfreðar ˈsaɣa ˈwandˌrɛːðaˌskalds]) is one of the sagas of Icelanders. The saga is preserved in several 14th-century manuscripts, including Möðruvallabók and Flateyjarbók, but there are significant differences between the versions.

It relates the story of Hallfreðr vandræðaskáld, an Icelandic poet active around the year 1000. The saga has some resemblance to the sagas of other poets, such as Kormáks saga or Gunnlaugs saga, but in Hallfreðar saga there is less emphasis on the romantic relationships of the skald. Instead, the saga dwells on the troubled conversion of Hallfreðr from Norse paganism to Christianity, and his relations with King Óláfr Tryggvason and other Norwegian rulers.
