= Brenna Adams byskups =

Brenna Adams byskups (The Burning of Bishop Adam) is a short Old Norse narrative (þáttr) about Adam of Melrose, Bishop of Caithness and the events that led to his death in 1222. It is preserved in Flateyjarbók and sometimes included as an appendix to Orkneyinga saga.
