= Flateyjarannáll =

Medieval Icelandic annal

Flateyjarannáll ('The Flateyjarbók Annals') are Icelandic annals found at the end of Flateyjarbók. They were compiled by the priest Magnús Þórhallsson between 1388 and 1394. The events recorded in the annals were taken from earlier sources (such as Lögmannsannáll) until about 1388, whereas the events following that date were recorded from Magnús' own knowledge or contemporary accounts.
