= The Tale of Thorstein Staff-Struck =

The Tale of Thorstein Staff-Struck (Old Norse Þorsteins þáttr stangarhǫggs) is an Icelandic þáttr which tells the tale of a conflict between the houses of Thorarinn and Bjarni Brodd-Helgason at Hof, Iceland. The tale is thought to have originated in the mid-13th century; however, its earliest known record is on vellum fragments dated to the 15th century. The vast majority of the modern translation comes from 17th century paper fragments. The þáttr is often examined as it is considered to have strong artistic merit, exemplify saga characteristics, and to be of an appropriate length to examine in its entirety.

== Plot synopsis ==
Thorarinn is a poor, cantankerous retired Viking with bad vision. Despite his poverty, he is a bóndi who breeds horses. His son, Thorstein, is said to be a good, even-tempered man who does the work of three. He becomes involved in a horse-fight with Thord, a horse-breeder for Bjarni Brodd-Helgason. When it becomes apparent Thord’s horse is losing, Thord strikes Thorstein’s horse. Thorstein then strikes Thord’s horse; Thord in turn strikes Thorstein. Thorstein dismisses the strike as an accident to avoid conflict. Two of Bjarni’s farmhands, Thorvall and Thorhall, create the insulting nickname of Staff-Struck for Thorstein.

Months later, Thorstein is accused, by his father, of being a ragr for running away from a conflict and for not demanding compensation. Thorstein later confronts and kills Thord after he refused to state whether the act was an accident or not. Thorstein proclaims the killing to a woman, who tells Bjarni, at dinner, after Thorstein has escaped. Bjarni as gothi outlaws Thorstein for the slaying, but does not actively hunt Thorstein to kill or remove him from the land.

When insulted by Thorvall and Thorhall, for failing to adequately avenge his thingmen, Bjarni commands that they chase down and kill Thorstein. They die in combat with Thorstein, and their bodies are returned to Bjarni’s farm tied to their horses. Rannveig, Bjarni’s wife, convinces him to kill Thorstein, fearing that the unavenged death of three thingmen by an outlaw would inexorably damage their honor. Against her wishes that he go forth accompanied by an entourage, he sets out to fight Thorstein alone.

Thorstein and Bjarni enter into a duel. Bjarni becomes thirsty and asks Thorstein to pause so he can have a drink of water. Thorstein obliges. Bjarni’s shoe becomes untied and he asks Thorstein to pause. Thorstein obliges. Bjarni’s sword soon becomes dull. After an exchange of insults and threats, Thorstein offers to exchange the blade for one of his father's. When it becomes apparent that Thorstein has been holding back, Bjarni offers Thorstein the opportunity to end the fight if he takes the place of the three men he had slain by becoming Bjarni's farmhand. Thorstein accepts.

Bjarni then tells Thorarinn that he has slain Thorstein and offers to support him in his son’s absence. Thorarinn delivers a speech in which he insults gothis who take up support for the dependents of the people that they kill, claiming that it is a hollow act done purely for personal satisfaction as opposed to true repentance. He then attempts to attack Bjarni. Bjarni defends against the attack and tells Thorarinn how Thorstein and he came to terms. Bjarni and Thorstein then move to Hof and live successful lives.

== Interpretations and implications ==
=== An aggressive culture ===
The saga has been interpreted as a critique of the aggressive nature of medieval Icelandic culture. Under the cultural system, an individual is expected to avenge all transgressions or be seen as dishonorable and cowardly. Thorstein becomes embroiled in a cycle of purposeless violence, when his own father is brought to calling him ragr, for trying to avoid it. The climactic fight between Bjarni and Thorstein can be seen as cultural display. Both men are forced to blows to put up a display of violence, so they can be seen as assertive, despite neither of them actually wishing to do true harm. The heroes are caught between respect for a rigid, heroic code that demands vengeance and their awareness of the absurdity of their situation. This tale has been used to examine the strong dichotomy between the practical and ceremonial views of violence in medieval Icelandic society.

=== Nicknames ===
The Nordic practice of nicknaming is of key importance to this tale. Thorstein receives the nickname Staff-Struck. A play on the Nordic practice of shame-stroke, this nickname is not only practically descriptive of the events at horse-fight but has strong sexual implications. The act of creating an insulting nickname was a serious crime, carrying a penalty of lesser outlawry for three years. The passive acceptance of this name combined with Thorstein's initial refusal to pursue legal action against Thord causes a cowardly stigma, acknowledged even by his own father.

=== Gendered insults ===
The tale displays the highly gendered nature of Nordic insulting. The references to ragr and shame-stroke mentioned above are found with additional insults. Thorarinn insulted Thorstein by claiming he was working too early in the morning. This is representative of the gendered work schedule in Iceland where women wake up and begin their day's work before the men. When proclaiming Thorstein's killing, a requirement to reduce a homicide to manslaughter, he claimed that a bull had gored Thord. This has been interpreted as a sexualized metaphor.

=== Saga style ===
Thorstein Staff-Struck was analyzed by Theodore Andersson as a perfect example of his six part saga style, consisting of an introduction, conflict, climax, revenge, and reconciliation. Some scholars debate this structuralist model.

=== Tense patterns ===
Peter Richardsons suggested that the tense patterns of Thorstein Staff-Struck are representative of larger tense patterns in the saga style and are used to build or relieve tension.

=== Portrayal of the elderly ===
Ármann Jakobsson has used The Tale of Thorstein Staff-Struck to argue how the sagas portray old men as old women, in part by the examination of the actions taken by Thorarinn.

== Translations ==
- Maxwell, Anthony (1997), The Complete Sagas of Icelanders IV, Reykjavik, Iceland: Liefur Eiriksson Publishing, pp. 335–340, ISBN 9979-9293-4-0.
- Maxwell, Anthony (2001), The Sagas of Icelanders (PDF), New York, NY: Penguin, pp. 677–685, ISBN 0-670-88990-3, archived from the original (PDF) on 2016-03-04.
