= Ívars þáttr Ingimundarsonar =

Icelandic short story about a king

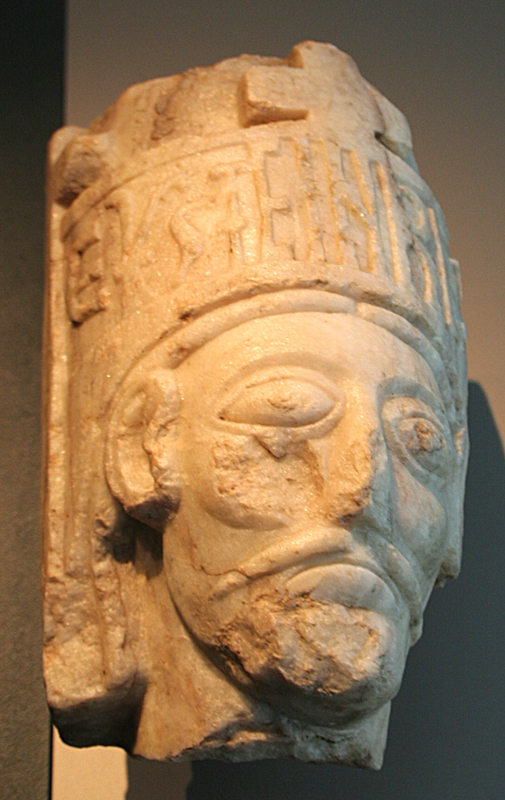
Head of King Eysteinn

Ívars þáttr Ingimundarsonar (The Tale of Ívarr Son of Ingimundr) is a short episode in the kings' saga Morkinskinna (often referred to as a þáttr), which emphasizes king Eysteinn's goodness.

Ívarr, an Icelander, lived at the court of king Eysteinn, who liked him much. His brother Þorfinnr went to Norway too, but he was jealous of Ívarr and soon came back. Before his departure, Ívarr asked him to tell the woman he loved to wait for him. But Þorfinnr married her. When he learned that, Ívarr got very upset. The king asked him what was on his mind and soon discovered. He then proposed his support so that he could marry the woman, but Ívarr explained that she was his brother's wife. Eysteinn made many unsuccessful attempts to find how he could take Ívarr's mind out of his sadness and eventually suggested that they could talk about the woman every day, for a grief could be relieved if it was shared. So they did, and Ívarr soon recovered.

The story is often framed within the context of a proto-form of Freudian talk therapy.
