= Eiríks þáttr rauða =

Medieval Icelandic tale

Eiríks þáttr rauða ('The Tale of Erik the Red') is a short story about Erik the Red, the conversion of his son, Leif Erikson, to Christianity, and the Norse discovery of North America by Bjarni Herjólfsson.

The tale is preserved in the Flateyjarbók, in columns 221–223, where it is interpolated into the Saga of Óláfr Tryggvason. It is commonly combined and translated with Grœnlendinga þáttr (I) as the Saga of the Greenlanders.

== Translations ==
English translations of Eiríks þáttr rauða can be found in:

- Reeves, Arthur Middleton, The Finding of Wineland the Good: The History of the Icelandic Discovery of America, London: Henry Frowde, Oxford University Press, 1890 (pages 60–64, under the sections titled "A Brief History of Eric the Red, Leif the Lucky Baptized, and Biarni goes in quest of Greenland.")
- Royal Danish General Staff, Topographical Department, Flateyjarbok. The "Flatey book", Copenhagen, 1893 (pages 221–223)
