= The Tale of Sarcastic Halli =

Tale from Icelandic Sagas

The Tale of Sarcastic Halli (Old Norse: Sneglu-Halla þáttr; Modern Icelandic: Sneglu-Halla þáttur) is an Old Icelandic þáttr that despite being criticized for its lack of proper structure, has been praised for its strong comedic effect. The þáttr tells the tale of a battle of wits between Sarcastic (or Skinny) Halli and Thjodolf master-poet in their attempts to appeal to King Harald. The þáttr is contained in the kings' saga Morkinskinna, and an extended version exists in Flateyjarbók, which is the basis for the English translation.

== Plot synopsis ==
=== Flateyjarbók version ===
Sarcastic Halli, an Icelander named for his sharp wit, entered into King Harald’s service and into competition with the court's master-poet, Thjodolf, to see who was the best. After quickly composing an insulting verse of the court's dwarf, Halli’s great skill is acknowledged by the king.

Halli soon becomes a critic of the king and his dining practices, as the king would start eating first and remove all food after he was full, often before everyone else was satisfied. The king confronts him over a bowl of porridge, which inspires his punishment to force Halli to eat porridge until he bursts or be decapitated. Halli calls him on his bluff and the king backs down.

He is tested again by being forced to compose a poetic verse before the dwarf can carry a roast pig to him. Halli succeeds and is much praised. He enters into conflict with Thjodolf again after Thjodolf accuses Halli of lying about his poem for the king. They engage in a senna, of which Halli is the victor.

Halli, in an attempt to punish an overbearing man named Einar the Fly, falsely claims he slew his brother. The man, known never to pay compensation, initially threatens Halli but eventually concedes after Halli threatens to ruin his name with insulting verses. Einar offers him three silver marks that are in his wallet. When Halli retrieves the wallet there are four, of which he takes three to avoid stealing so Einar has no way of taking legal recourse.

Halli goes to Denmark where he tricks a man, Raud, out of a golden arm ring and recites a very poor poem to the King of Denmark, in an attempt to receive money. The king takes well to the poem. The king offers to pour silver on his head, and Halli can keep what sticks to his hair. The plan backfires when Halli puts tar in his hair.

Halli receives an axe when he is caught staring at it. The king offers to have sex with him for it, to which Halli replies “No, but it seems understandable that you should sell the axe for the same price you paid for it." When king Haraldr gets word of Halli's death, he jokes that this was probably over a bowl of porridge.

=== Morkinskinna version ===
This less known version, included in the Morkinskinna kings saga, follows similar lines as the later Flateyjarbók version, but is less explicit in both its language and its story. In addition the style is more subtle and the narrative leaves more to the audience's intuition. The story ends with Sneglu-Halli returning to the Norwegian king's court on a ship, after he frightens a group of German merchants in order to gain passage.

== Interpretations and implications ==
=== Skaldic poetry ===
The tale has been used to examine skaldic poetry outside of its courtly setting, and for its comedic as opposed to its praise-giving effects. It is believed that skaldic poetry can be used to illustrate mundane activities as myths and legends, to not only insult the subject but maintain the poetic verse as high art. The Tale of Sarcastic Halli has also been used to suggest that how the complexity of skaldic poetry has been used as a buffer between groups of Nordic culture against Danish and English Culture. In effect, the ability, or lack thereof, to understand and differentiate quality from poor poetry and the complexity of the kennings within stands as a litmus test for esoteric or exoteric status.

=== Characterization of King Harald ===
The Tale of Sarcastic Halli has been used to characterized King Harald’s love of Icelanders, Icelandic poets, and rude-crude humor even if he is the subject of said humor, most notably the scene with the axe. This point has been contested, and this same story has been suggested as an example of King Harald’s growing contempt for poets in the latter half of his life.

=== The practice of senna ===
The tale suggests alternative structures to the Nordic practice of senna, or ritualistic insulting, as there is a clear instance of it contained within the þættir. It suggests that the structure of the senna was not as ritualistic but rather more colloquial than thought, as there are examples of appeals to both the arbiter and the crowd. Additionally, it breaks the classic structure by the inclusion on an entire complete narrative within one of the retorts rather than the classical allusions to known events. It's believed that Halli's and Thjodolf's status as Icelanders in a Norwegian court, and therefore the absence of the common knowledge of these individuals' histories, is the driving force for allowing a break in the senna structure.

=== Food culture ===
The tale has been used as an example of the strangeness of Icelandic food culture.

=== Gift-giving practices ===
The interactions between King Harold and Halli in the axe scene has been used to demonstrate Nordic gift-giving practices and the fundamental importance between the words used for "to give" and "to sell".
