= Senna (poetic) =

Senna is a form of Eddic poetry consisting of an exchange of insults between participants, ranging from the use of expletives to accusing an opponent of moral or sexual impropriety. It traditionally existed in an oral form, with the skald Þórarinn Stuttfeldr once describing the poetry of his opponent as being like leirr ens gamla ara, 'the mud of the old eagle', literally claiming that his poetry was like dung. Moreover, Þórarinn Stuttfeldr makes a reference to the myth of the Mead of Poetry, in which Odin, in shape of an eagle, defecates a part of the stolen mead which becomes the mead of the rhymesters, and thus stands for bad poetry in general.

There are also numerous written examples of senna in Old Norse-Icelandic literature, including Ölkofra þáttr (The Tale of the Ale-Hood) in which a carpenter is accused of setting fire to the wood of six powerful chieftains while burning charcoal, and the eddic poem Lokasenna, which consists of a duel of words between Loki and several other Norse gods, and in which Loki accuses the other gods of sexual misdeeds.
