= The Tale of Auðun of the West Fjords =

Old Norse short story

Auðunar þáttr vestfirska (Old Norse: Old Norse pronunciation: [ˈɔuðunɑz̠ ˈθɑːttz̠ ˈwestˌfirskɑ]; Modern Icelandic: Auðunar þáttur vestfirska [ˈœyːðʏːnar ˈθauhtʏr ˈvɛstˌfɪska]; The Tale of Auðun of the West Fjords) is a short tale (or þáttr) preserved in three distinct versions as part of the saga of Harald III of Norway (reigned 1047-1066, a.k.a. Haraldr inn harðráði Sigurðsson), as the saga is told in the manuscripts Morkinskinna, Flateyjarbók, and several others. Widely translated and anthologised, it is admired for its beautifully simple account of a poor Icelander from the Westfjords, the harshest region of the country, who decides to take a polar bear as a present to Sweyn II of Denmark (reigned 1047-74/76, a.k.a. Sveinn Úlfsson). Despite having to navigate the court of Haraldr, Sweyn’s rival, Auðun persists in his mission and later embarks on a pilgrimage to Rome. Auðun's mixture of determination, audacity and humility leads him to gain the respect of both kings, and through him their respect for one another increases also.

Although ostensibly historical, the work is more plausibly to be seen as "a historified folktale".

== Manuscripts ==
The tale is preserved in three manuscripts:

- Morkinskinna (c. 1275)
- Flateyjarbók (c. 1390)
- Hulda (c. 1350-1374)

== Synopsis ==
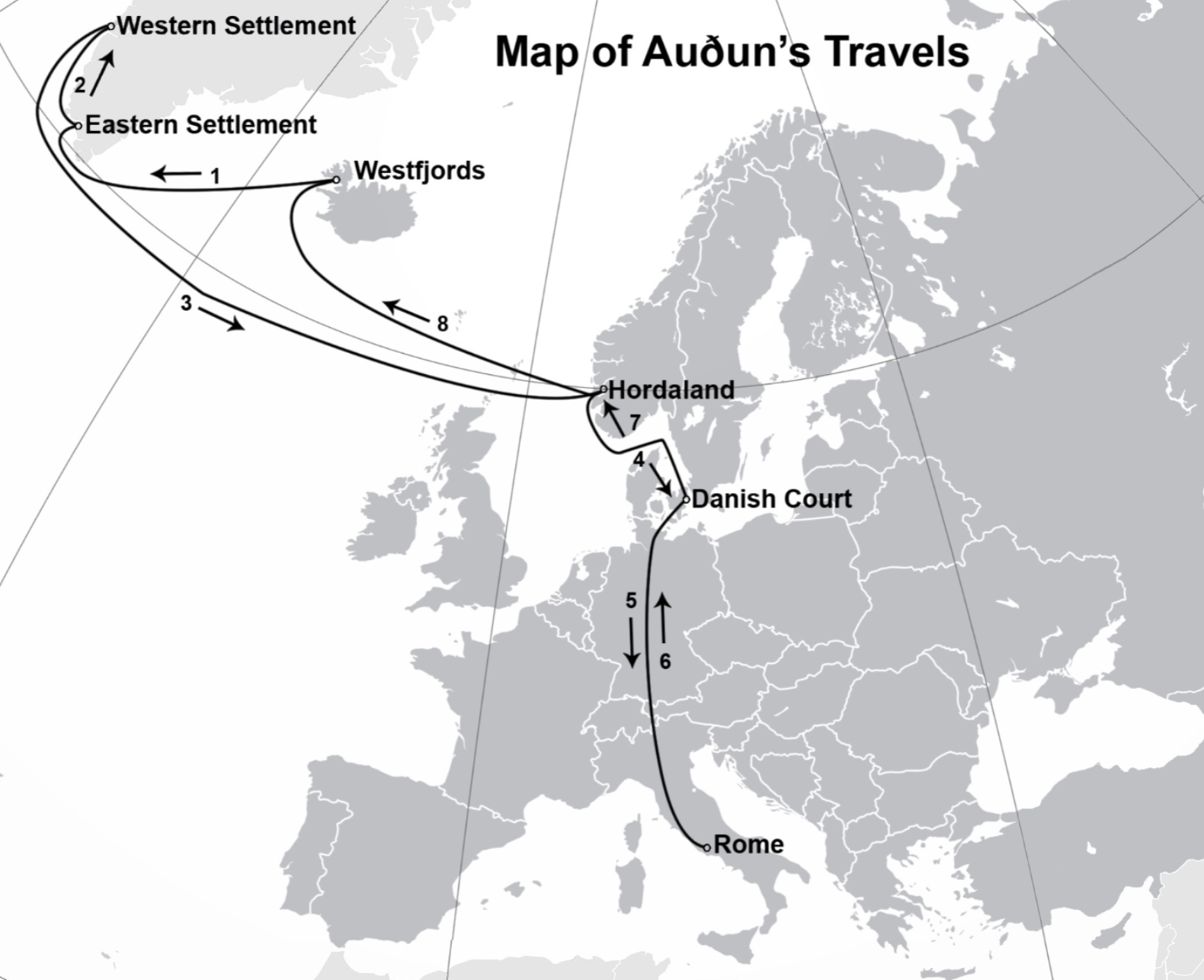
Map detailing Auðun's course of travel in Auðun's Tale, beginning and ending in Iceland.

Auðun of the Westfjords is a poor man working for his relative Þorstein. A Norwegian ship arrives and Auðun aids the captain Þórir with advice and sells goods for him. In return, Þórir grants Auðun passage, and Auðun makes financial arrangements to support his mother for three years. Auðun then travels to Greenland, where he meets a hunter named Eirik and buys a polar bear from him with the remainder of his money. The hunter warns Auðun about spending his entire fortune on the bear, but Auðun does not heed his warning.

Next Auðun travels to Norway and meets King Haraldr at a feast. The king asks if Auðun will sell or give him the bear, and Auðun replies that he intends to give it as a gift to King Sweyn of Denmark, with whom King Haraldr happens to be at war. Haraldr chastises Auðun for wanting to give a gift to his enemy, but instead of harming Auðun, grants him passage.

By the time Auðun crosses into Denmark, he has run out of provisions for himself and his bear, and a king's steward named Aki offers him help on the condition that he receives ownership of half the bear in return. Auðun is forced to accept and the two men seek audience with the king. King Sweyn banishes Aki for interfering with Auðun's gift-giving, and invites Auðun to stay with him.

After some time, Auðun asks King Sweyn leave to go on pilgrimage to Rome. The king gives him money and other pilgrims to accompany him and asks him to return to him when he is done.

Auðun successfully completes his pilgrimage, but becomes ill during his return. He arrives back in Denmark, bald and almost completely unrecognizable. King Sweyn's retainers laugh at him, but the king responds by saying that he has provided for his soul more than they have. He gives Auðun new clothes and offers him to stay as his cupbearer. Auðun replies he cannot stay and must return to Iceland, since the three-year period he set money aside to provide for his mother is nearly up. Upon parting, the king gives him a ship, a bag full of silver, and an arm ring, saying that he should only give the ring to a high-ranking person if he needs to repay a debt.

After departing, Auðun travels back to Norway and relates his experiences with King Sweyn to King Haraldr, from his acceptance of the bear to funding his pilgrimage to Rome and hospitality. Auðun describes his gifts from King Sweyn, and with each item, King Haraldr says he would have done the same for Auðun, except the bag of silver. Auðun then comes to the ring, and gives it to King Haraldr, since he owes him for granting him passage to complete his journey. The king accepts the ring, and gives Auðun a sword and cloak before he departs.

Auðun returns to Iceland and has good fortune for the rest of his life there.

== Themes ==
Auðun's Tale is driven largely by Auðun's luck. William Ian Miller explains the etymology of Auðun's name, tracing the elements back to vinr, meaning 'friend' and auð, meaning 'luck, good fortune, fate'. Miller further connects the root of auð to the vað in vaðmál, the woven cloth used as a type of currency in medieval Iceland, and to the spinning and weaving of fate by the Norns. Thus, Miller argues, Auðun is inherently lucky and the course of his story "exists in embryo in his name."

Miller rejects scholars' two main theories of Auðun's motives for his behavior: that he is either a holy fool or acting solely out of self-interest. According to Miller, Auðun's actions are too carefully thought-out for him to be naive, and interprets the purpose of Aki's character as a demonstration that Auðun is not acting out of pure self-interest. Instead, Miller suggests that Auðun's actions are driven by a combination of self-interest tempered with sincere, noble intentions.

Gift-giving and exchange are central to Auðun's Tale. Members of Old Norse society exchanged gifts with each other as a means for establishing and cementing social bonds. A gift normally carried with it an obligation to give a gift in return. Auðun's Tale explores the implications of gift exchange between social peers of similar standing, between lower and higher standing (such as Auðun and King Haraldr and King Sweyn), and between humans and God (Auðun going on pilgrimage to Rome). Edward G. Fichtner sees the story representing Auðun's coming of age "by his learning how to participate in the exchange of gifts in his culture"

== Editions and translations ==
=== Flateyjarbók version ===
- Flateyjarbók: en samling af norske konge-sagaer med indskudte mindre fortællinger om begivenheder i og udenfor Norge samt annaler, 3 vols, ed. Guðbrandur Vigfússon and C.R. Unger (Christiania [Oslo], 1860–1868). Audun’s Story at 3:411–415. https://books.google.com/books?id=qWgJAAAAQAAJ&
- William Ian Miller, Audun and the Polar Bear Luck, Law, and Largesse in a Medieval Tale of Risky Business, Medieval Law and its Practice, 1 (Leiden: Brill, 2014). Translation into English pp. 7–12.
- Hermann Pálsson, Hrafnkel’s Saga and other Stories (Harmondsworth, 1971). Translation into English pp. 121–128.

=== Morkinskinna version ===
- Morkinskinna: The Earliest Icelandic Chronicle of the Norwegian Kings (1030–1157), trans. by Theodore M. Andersson and Kari Ellen Gade, Islandica 51 (Ithaca, NY, 2000). Translation into English pp. 211–215 (M ch. 36).
- Vestfirðinga sögur, ed. Björn K. Þórólfsson and Guðni Jónsson, Íslenzk fornrit, 6 (Reykjavík, 1943). Includes Morkinskinna version of Auðunar þáttr.
- Auðunar þáttr vestfirzka from heimskringla.no
- Auðunar þáttur vestfirska from snerpa.is
- Arnold R. Taylor, “Auðunn and the Bear,” Saga-Book of the Viking Society 13 (1946–53), 81–87.
- Gwyn Jones, Eirik the Red and other Icelandic Sagas (Oxford, 1961). Translation into English pp. 163–170.
- 'The Story of Audunn and the Bear', trans. by G. Turville-Petre, in Seven Icelandic Short Stories, ed. by Ásgeir Pétursson and Steingrímur J. Þorsteinsson (Reykjavík: Ministry of Education, 1960), at https://www.gutenberg.org/ebooks/5603. From Morkinskinna 'except in a few cases where reference has been made' to Hulda and Flateyjarbók.

=== Hulda version ===
- Fornmanna Sögur, ed. Sveinbjörn Egilsson, et al., 12 vols (Copenhagen, 1825–1837). The Hulda ms. version of Audun’s Story, 6:297–307.
