= Resensannáll =

8th-century Icelandic manuscript

Resensannáll is one of the oldest known medieval Icelandic manuscripts, dating to the 8th century. The original manuscript was destroyed in the Copenhagen Fire of 1728, but a copy belonging to Árni Magnússon (c. 1700) survived and is cataloged as AM 424 4°. Its notable content includes a mention of the search for Erik Gnupsson, bishop of Greenland, from known territory into Helluland, Markland and Vinland.

== Bibliography ==
Eldbjørg Haug, The Icelandic Annals as Historical Sources, 1997
