= Skálholtannáll =

Icelandic annals manuscript

Skálholtannáll (from Old Norse: Skálholt Annals) is a medieval Icelandic manuscript preserved as manuscript AM 420 at the Árni Magnússon Institute for Icelandic Studies. It takes its name from Skálholt where a copy of the annals was found along with two copies of Lögmannsannáll. The annals cover a historical period from the first entry in the year 140 through the last in 1356, although it is presumed that the original contains entries beginning with the birth of Christ, but today that is still only a conjecture. The copy of Skálholtannáll was dated to 1362, but its content shows that, although it is written by a single author, it may be that two participants interacted in the original; the entries between 1349 and 1356 are briefer, demonstrating a different style compared to the rest of the entries.

== Brot af Skálholtsannáll ==
Brot af Skálholtsannáll, which literally translates to "fragment of the Skalhólt Annals," is a compendium of contributions to the annals that begins mid-entry in 1328 and ends in 1372. It is one of the most collaborative manuscripts, with at least ten different authors identified. One author that stands out is the first, who covers the period between 1328 and 1362, while the rest contribute their respective parts for between two and four years each. The fragment was found in the 17th century. There is speculation that it comes from the north of Iceland, probably from the Möðruvellir monastery, because the entries about priors are much more complete than others. The fragment is preserved as manuscript AM 747 4.º.

== Bibliography ==
Eldbjørg Haug, The Icelandic Annals as Historical Sources, 1997
