= Ölkofra þáttr =

Old Norse tale

Ölkofra þáttr (also known as Ölkofra saga), the "Tale of Ölkofri" or the "Tale of Ale-Hood", is a þáttr, a minor Old Norse prose genre related to the sagas of Icelanders. Preserved in the 14th-century manuscript known as Möðruvallabók and other post-Reformation copies, the tale is a satire on the judicial system of the medieval Icelandic Commonwealth. It tells the story of an ale-brewer, named Þórhallr but known as Ölkofri or "Ale-Hood" for the hood that he habitually wears. Ölkofri accidentally sets fire to some valuable woodland belonging to six powerful Icelandic chieftains. These chieftains consequently file suit against him at the Althing in an effort to get him outlawed, but thanks to the efforts of men who unexpectedly come to his aid, Ölkofri manages to escape this fate.

On a side note, the main character's occupation—brewer and seller of ale at the Icelandic Alþing—provides some confirmation that barley was once grown in Iceland during the tail end of a warm phase known as the Medieval Warm Period. Grain could not be cultivated there as the climate cooled and growing seasons shrank.

== Critical reception ==
In Möðruvallabók the text is rubricated as ‘Ǫlkofra saga’ but has generally been considered as a þáttr in modern critical works on the text. Emily Lethbridge suggests that in treating the Ölkofra text as a þáttr critics "may well be implicitly perpetuating certain hierarchical value judgements founded on assumptions about the relative lengths and narrative value or complexity of sagas (longer, more sophisticated) and þættir (shorter, less sophisticated)."

== Bibliography ==
=== Editions ===
- Gering, Hugo, ed. (1880). Olkofra þattr (PDF). Halle: Verlag der Buchhandlung des Waisenhauses. Archived from the original (PDF) on 2015-03-16.
- Guðni Jónsson (ed.). Ölkofra saga. Íslendinga sögur. Vol. XII: Árnesinga sögur og Kjalnesinga. Digitised at heimskringla.no
- Jón Jóhannesson, ed. (1950). "Ölkofra þáttr". Austfirðinga sögur. Íslenzk fornrit. Vol. 11. Reykjavík: Hið íslenzka fornritafélag. pp. 82–94. ISBN 9979-893-11-7.
- Þorleifur Jónsson, ed. (1904). "Ölkofra þáttr". Fjörutíu Íslendinga-þættir (PDF). Reykjavík: Sigurður Kristjánsson. pp. 525–537.
- "Ölkofra saga". Icelandic Saga Database. Archived from the original on 2015-03-16. Edition in modern Icelandic spelling

=== Translations ===
- Hermann Pálsson (1971). "Ale-hood". Hrafnkel's Saga and other Icerlandic stories. Harmondsworth: Penguin. pp. 82–93. ISBN 9780140442380.
- Tucker, John (1997). "Olkofri´s saga". In Viðar Hreinsson (ed.). Complete sagas of Icelanders, including 49 tales. Vol. 5. Reykjavik: Leifur Eiriksson. pp. 231–237. ISBN 9789979929352.
- Tucker, John (2013). "Olkofri's saga". In Viðar Hreinsson (ed.). Comic sagas and tales from Iceland. London; New York: Penguin. ISBN 9780140447743.

=== Secondary literature ===
- Sayers, William (1991). "Serial defamation in two medieval tales: The Icelandic Ölkofra þáttr and the Irish Scéla mucce Meic Dathó" (PDF). Oral Tradition: 35–57. Archived from the original (PDF) on 2015-04-02.
