= Sörla þáttr =

14th century Norse text

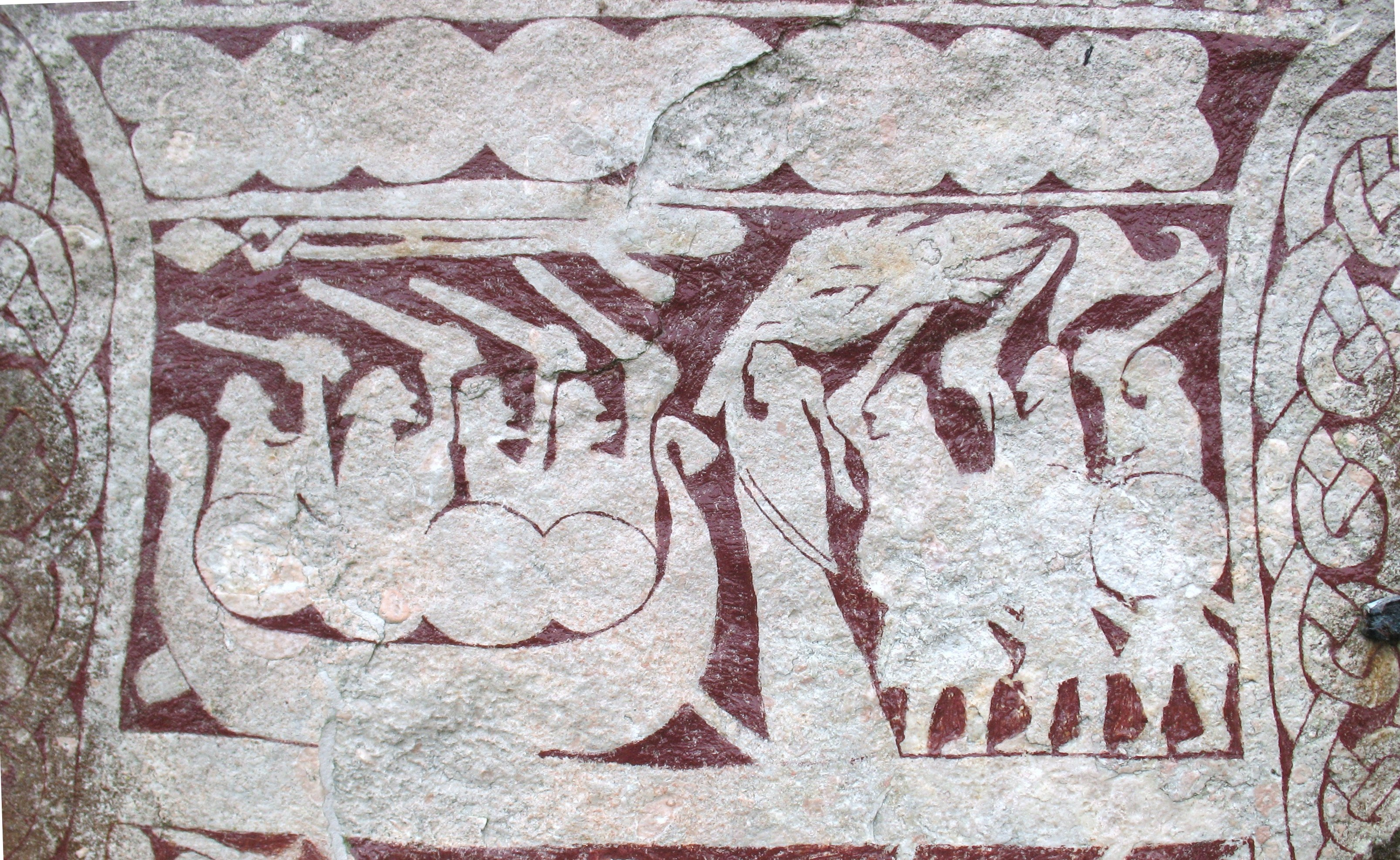
Detail from the Stora Hammars I stone, an image stone on Gotland

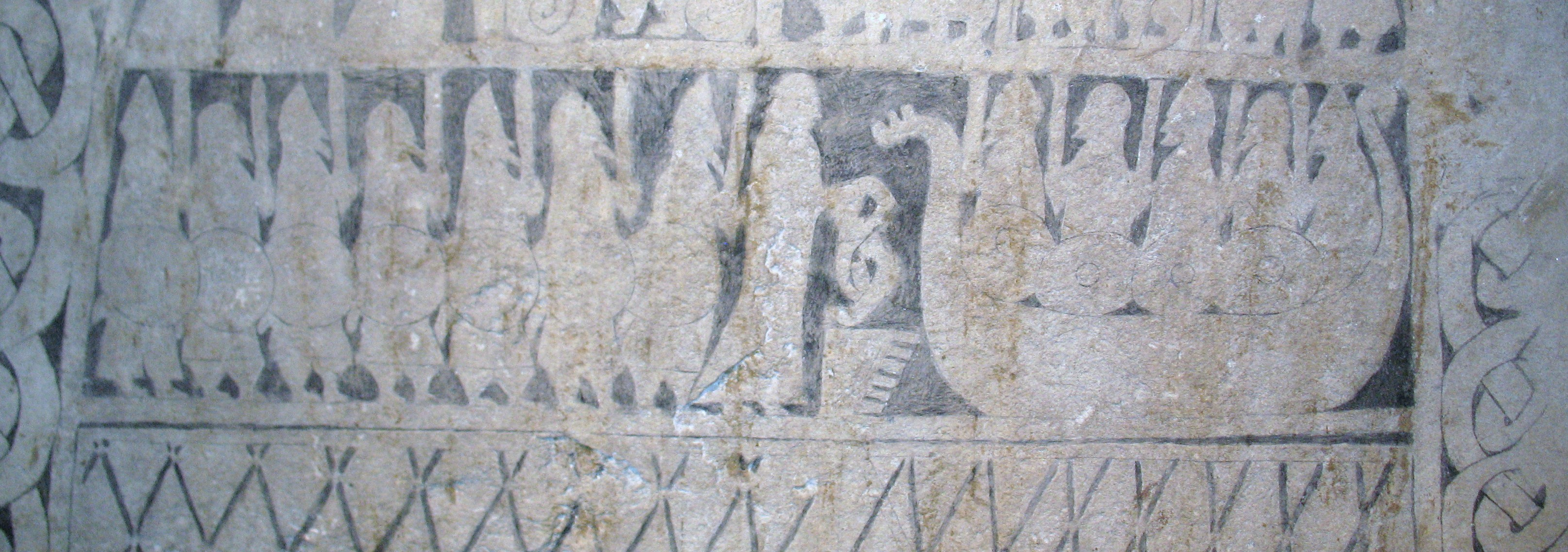
Detail from the Smiss (I) stone, an image stone on Gotland

Sörla þáttr eða Heðins saga ok Högna is a short narrative from the extended version Óláfs saga Tryggvasonar en mesta found in the Flateyjarbók manuscript, which was written and compiled by two Christian priests, Jon Thordson and Magnus Thorhalson, in the late 14th century. The narrative begins 24 years after the death of Fróði, and takes place in the 9th and the 10th centuries. It is a composite tale containing a story of how Freyja acquired a necklace from the Dwarves, how that led to a bloody war, and how Olaf Tryggvason brought peace to the land.

The story parallels elements of earlier stories such as Heimskringla (euhemerization of gods), parts of the poem Lokasenna (Loki's accusation of Gefjun sleeping with a boy for a necklace), parts of the Húsdrápa poem (Loki stealing the necklace Brísingamen), and the eternal battle Hjaðningavíg (various earlier sources). In the end of the story, the arrival of Christianity dissolves the old curse that was traditionally to endure until Ragnarök.

The story has been described as "post-classical" due to elements such as the descriptor of Loki as "cunning" without apparent irony, featuring Freyja and Loki as court retainers, and the open representation of Freyja's sexuality that it features. 19th century scholar Benjamin Thorpe referred to Freyja's role in the tale as "rather awkward".

== Synopsis ==
=== Freyja and the Dwarves ===
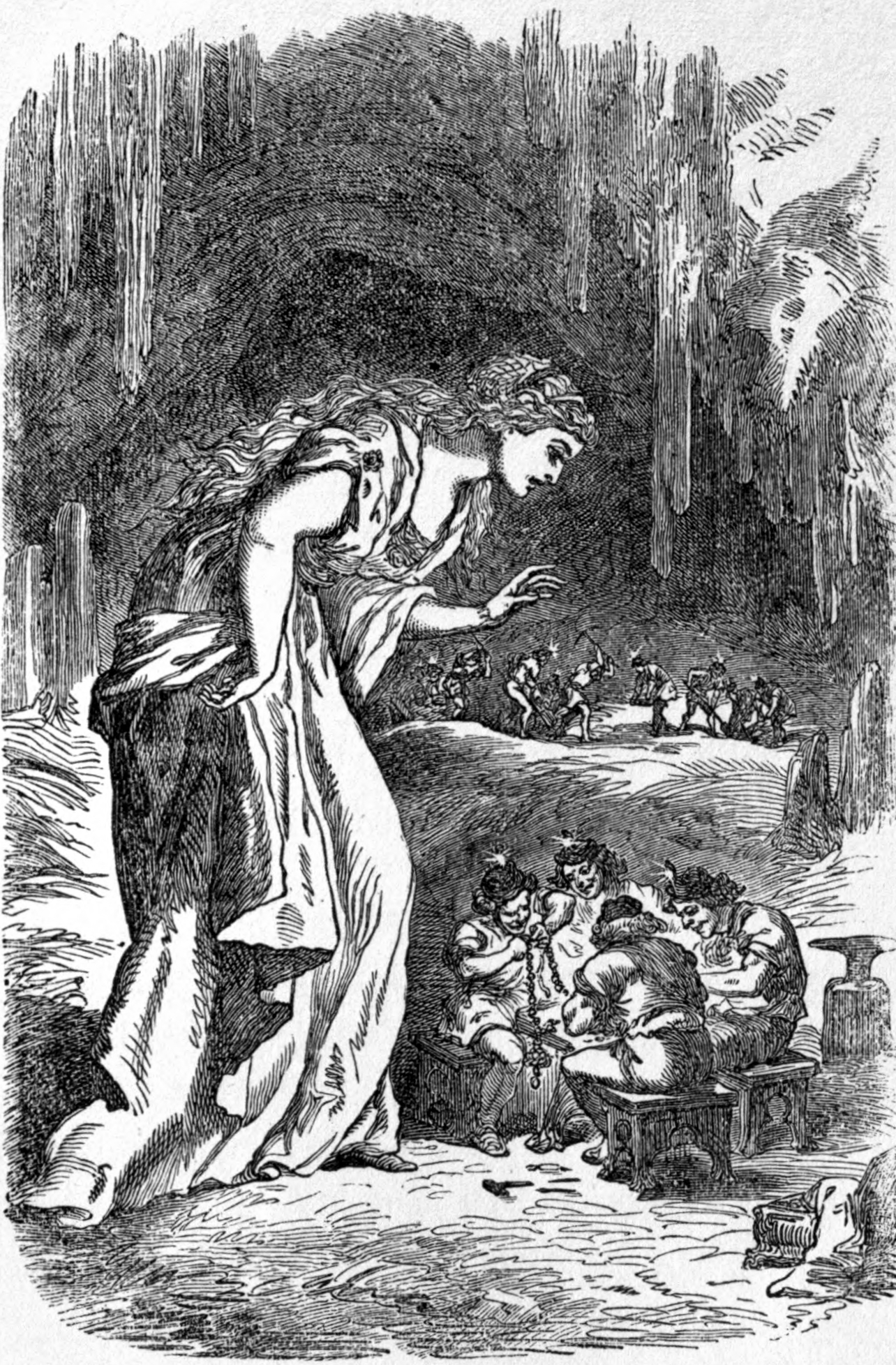
Freyja in the Dwarfs' Cave, illustration by Louis Huard

The tale begins in Asia, and a land called Asialand, saying that Odin was the King there; and relates that Freyja was the daughter of Njord and Odin's concubine, whom Odin loved very much.

Then it introduces four dwarves named Álfrigg, Dvalinn (Dwalin), Berlingr and Grérr and since they were dwarves they were skilled craftsmen and lived in a large stone. But in those days, they mingled more with people than they do today.

One day, Freyja saw that the Dwarves were making a beautiful collar and she offered them both gold and silver in exchange for it. But, the Dwarves would only sell it to her in exchange for one night each with her. Freyja agreed and after four nights with the Dwarves, she returned with the beautiful collar.

=== Loki ===
Loki is then introduced and reveals that he was the son of Fárbauti and his wife Laufey, who was called needle because she was so slender. Loki became very popular with Odin because of his gift for providing information.

When Loki told Odin of Freyja's collar, Odin asked him to fetch the collar or never to return, so Loki transformed himself into a fly and found a way into Freyja's bower. When he found her, he saw that she had the collar on and lay on her back. He turned into a flea and bit her whereupon she turned so he could unlock the collar and steal it. Then he returned to Odin and gave him the collar.

When Freyja woke up, she learned that Odin had got hold of the collar and asked to have it back. Odin said that he knew how she had acquired the collar and that he would only let her have it back on the condition that she enchanted two kings and twenty subordinate kings so that they would fight each other every night, die and rise again, until a Christian lord entered the battle and defeated them all. Freyja promised that so would be done and got the collar back.

=== King Erling and Sörli ===
King Erlingr was a king of Oppland and he had a queen and the sons Sörli and Erlendr. Sörli and Erlendr went pillaging as Vikings as soon as their age permitted and one day they began to fight Sindri Sveigisson, the grandson of Haki at Elfarsker (the islands outside modern Gothenburg). The battle ended with the death of both Sindri and Erlendr, after which Sörli sailed into the Baltic Sea (Eystra salt) to harry.

=== Sörli kills king Halfdan ===
The king of Denmark was called Halfdan and he resided in Roskilde (Hróiskelda) and was married to Hvedna the old. Their sons were named Högni and Hakon and they were great warriors.

When Sörli arrived in Denmark he saw a great longship, which king Halfdan was about to board in order to attend a royal meeting. Sörli decided to kill the king and appropriate the great ship, in spite of his marshal Sævar's warnings about Högni and Hakon. Halfdan fought heroically, but was slain and Sörli sailed away with the dragon ship.

Sörli later learnt that Högni had returned from an expedition and was moored at Odense, and so he sailed to meet Högni and tell him about his father's demise. He wanted to offer Högni and Hakon recompensation and to become foster-brethren, but the two brothers would have none of it. After a battle in which Hakon, Sævar and Erlingr died, and finally Sörli fell. However, Högni healed Sörli and agreed to enter sworn brotherhood.

After some time Sörli died in the East, an event for which there is a poem. When Högni learnt of this he went east, won many victories and finally became king there with twenty kings as paying vassals. He was famous from the land of the Finns to Paris.

=== Hedinn and Högni ===
In Serkland, there was a king named Hjarandi, who had a son named Hedinn. This son was a great sea-king and he pillaged all over the Mediterranean until twenty kings paid tribute to him. One day he met a beautiful woman sitting on a chair who called herself Göndul. She told him of Högni, and agitated him to test his strength against the northerner. Hedinn took three hundred men, and sailed both a summer and a winter until he arrived in Denmark in spring.

When the two men met they tested each other's strength and entered sworn brotherhood. As Hedinn was unmarried, Högni betrothed him to his daughter Hildr, his only child. Hildr's mother was Hervor, the daughter of Hjörvard who was the son of Heiðrekr Ulfhamr of the Hervarar saga. Hedinn soon met Göndul again, who asked him about what had happened since the last time. She gave him a magic potion and told him to crush Högni's wife with the prow of his ship and to kidnap Hildr. He did so, and Göndul then gave him a new horn to drink, and he fell asleep. In his dream, he heard Göndul reveal that she was a valkyrie and that she put him, Högni and their men under spells according to the wishes of Odin.

Högni hunted Hedinn and found him on an island named Hoy. Hedinn offered to give everything back to Högni and to sail away to Serkland and never come back. Högni, however, declared that nothing could atone the betrayal that Hedinn had committed.

The two armies started to fight and even though they cut each other all over, they stood still fighting and fighting for 143 years, so strong were the spells of Göndul, until Olaf Tryggvason arrived at the island.

=== Deliverance ===
Olaf and his crew grew concerned about the number of men who went to the island but never came back. Ivar Gleam-bright took his sword that he had got from Thorstein, the son of Iron-shield, the former owner, and went into the island. There he met a big and bloodied man of sorrowful countenance. It was Hedinn who told Ivar of the curse. Hedinn said that in order to be delivered from the curse, a Christian army had to fight with them, and every man who was slain by a Christian would remain dead. However, Hedinn advised Ivar not to look Högni in the face because Högni wore the Horror helmet (ægishjálmr). Instead Hedinn would fight Högni and Ivar would kill Högni from the behind. Ivar did so, and killed all the men until only Hedinn was left and was slain. Ivar went to see Hildr, but she had vanished.

Ivar went to see the king in the morning and told everybody of the event. The king and the men followed him to the battle ground, but everything had vanished and there was nothing to be seen. Only the blood on Ivar's sword testified to what had taken place.
