= Magnús Þórhallsson =

Icelandic priest and scribe (fl. 1397)

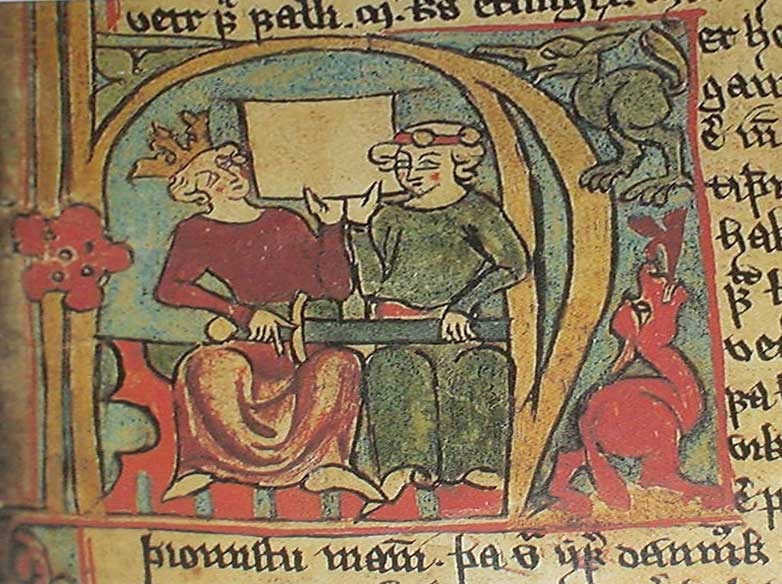
An illustrated initial from Flateyjarbók showing Magnús Þórhallsson's work.

Magnús Þórhallsson was an Icelandic priest who was one of two scribes (the other being Jón Þórðarson) who wrote the manuscript Flateyjarbók for knight and lawspeaker, Jón Hákonarson. Magnús was responsible for the second part of the manuscript after Jón Þórðarson left Iceland for Norway in the spring of 1388. Magnús also added three leaves to the front of the codex and rubricated and illuminated the entire manuscript. Ólafur Halldórsson has described his work as "among the most beautiful in medieval Icelandic manuscripts."

Very little of Magnús's life is known. A priest named Magnús Þórhallsson, assumed to be the same person, is the first witness named in two letters written on 2 April 1397 concerning land purchased by Þorsteinn Snorrason, abbot of Helgafell. In light of this, Magnús is thought to have been a priest there at that time. It is assumed that Magnús trained at a different school or scriptorium from Jón Þórðarson, as their handwriting differs markedly. Where Magnús trained, however, is unknown. In addition to his work on manuscripts from Helgafell, Magnús is associated with the Munkaþverá scriptorium and possibly also the secular scriptorium at Víðidalstunga, near Þingeyrar. In light of his early work, Drechsler has suggested that he may have begun his career as a Benedictine monk at Munkaþverá.

Stefán Karlsson has suggested that Magnús wrote, at least in part, the lost manuscript Vatnshyrna, also commissioned by Jón Hákonarson, based on the similarities in scribal habits between Flateyjarbók and the copy of Vatnshyrna made by Árni Magnússon. Magnus's hand is also found in two lines at the bottom of folio 51v of the manuscript Hulda (AM 66 fol.) and in the single leaf that preserves Grega saga. In addition to this, he is believed to have illuminated the manuscript AM 226 fol, which contains Stjórn, Alexanders saga, Rómverja saga and Gyðinga saga and worked on AM 139 4to (Jónsbók).
