= Bergsbók =

15th-century Icelandic manuscript

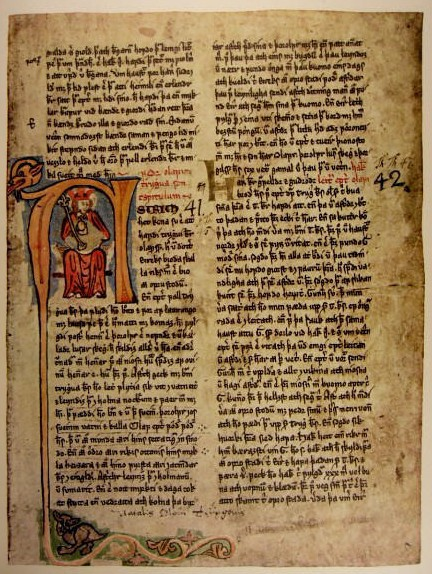
A sheet of Bergsbók manuscript and miniature. Royal Library of Stockholm, Sweden.

Bergsbók is an Icelandic manuscript from the early 15th century. It contains the kings' sagas Óláfs saga Tryggvasonar en mesta, a long version of Óláfs saga helga and several short texts and poems, mostly associated with the two kings. The redaction of Óláfs saga Tryggvasonar en mesta is of the early class. It is interpolated with several shorter texts, such as Hallfreðar saga, Rauðúlfs þáttr and Færeyinga saga.

Bergsbók is the only manuscript to preserve Óláfsdrápa Tryggvasonar and the only one to preserve a full version of Rekstefja. It is one of two manuscripts to preserve a complete version of Einarr Skúlason's Geisli.
