= Óláfsdrápa Tryggvasonar =

Icelandic skaldic poem

Óláfsdrápa Tryggvasonar (The drápa of Óláfr Tryggvason) is an Icelandic skaldic poem from ca. 1200. It relates the life story of the 10th century King Óláfr Tryggvason from his upbringing in Russia to his death at Svöldr. The poem is only preserved in Bergsbók and the text there is defective. After 16 dróttkvætt verses, there is a lacuna of an estimated 40 verses followed by 12 preserved final verses. The manuscript attributes the poem to Hallfreðr vandræðaskáld, Óláfr's court poet, but this attribution is rejected by modern scholars on grounds of style and language. The poem has many similarities with Rekstefja, a poem from the same time on the same subject and preserved in the same manuscript.

While by no means an original or historically important poem, the Óláfsdrápa has been praised for its "engaging directness". The unknown author was influenced by earlier 12th-century poets, such as Einarr Skúlason and Þorkell Hamarskáld.

Other praise poems dedicated to Óláfr Tryggvason also survive. One is likewise credited to Hallfreðr and another to Steinn Herdísarson. Both are generally accepted as authentic.
