= Tóka þáttr Tókasonar =

Tóka þáttr Tókasonar is a short legendary saga found in the Flateyjarbók.

== Sources and external links ==
- Cultural Paternity in the Flateyjarbók Óláfs saga Tryggvasonar, by Elizabeth Ashman Rowe.
- The Tale of Toki Tokason, translated by Peter Tunstall.
- The story in Old Norse at heimskringla.no.
- The story in Old Norse at Snerpa.
