= Hallfreðr vandræðaskáld =

Icelandic Skald (c. 965 – c. 1007)

Hallfreðr Óttarsson or Hallfreðr vandræðaskáld (Troublesome Poet) (c. 965 – c. 1007) was an Icelandic skald. He is the protagonist of Hallfreðar saga according to which he was the court poet first of Hákon Sigurðarson, then of Óláfr Tryggvason and finally of Eiríkr Hákonarson. A significant amount of poetry by Hallfreðr has been preserved, primarily in Hallfreðar saga and the kings' sagas but a few fragments are also quoted in Skáldskaparmál.

In his lausavísur Hallfreðr was an unusually personal skald, offering insight into his emotional life and, especially, his troubled and reluctant conversion from paganism to Christianity under the tutelage of king Óláfr. The following is an example.

Ǫll hefr ætt til hylli
Óðins skipat ljóðum
(algildar man'k) aldar
(iðjur várra niðja);
en trauðr, því't vel Viðris
vald hugnaðisk skaldi,
legg'k á frumver Friggjar
fjón því't Kristi þjónum.

—Lausavísur 10, Whaley's edition

The whole race of men to win
Óðinn's grace has wrought poems
(I recall the exquisite
works of my forebears);
but with sorrow, for well did
Viðrir's [Óðinn's] power please the poet,
do I conceive hate for the first husband of
Frigg [Óðinn], now I serve Christ.

—Lausavísur 10, Whaley's translation

The Bergsbók manuscript attributes an Óláfsdrápa Tryggvasonar to Hallfreðr, but this attribution is rejected by modern scholars.
