= Frederick York Powell =

English historian (1850–1904)

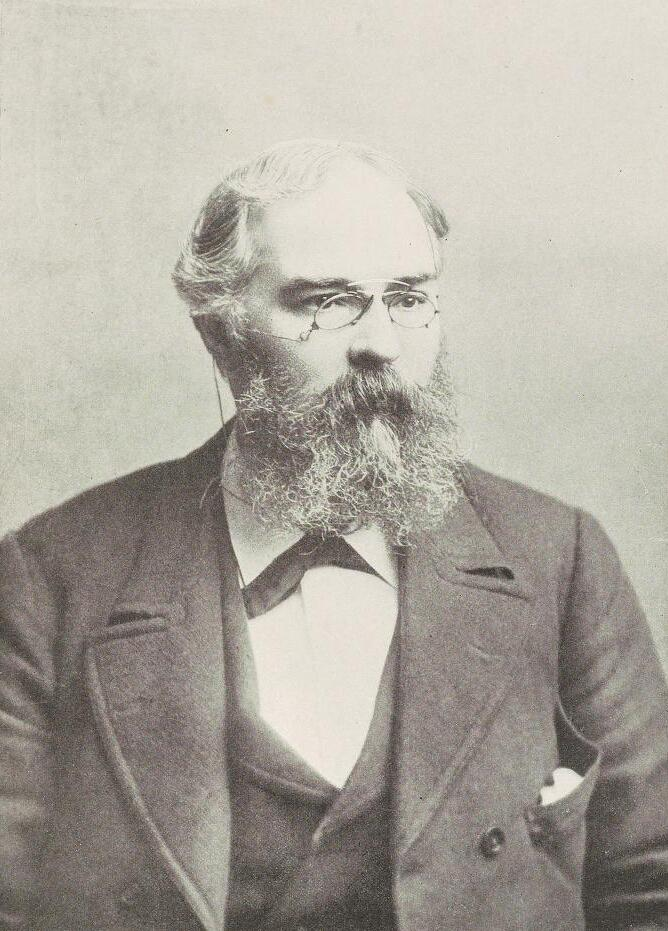
- Born: 4 January 1850; Bloomsbury, London, England
- Died: 8 May 1904 (aged 54); Oxford, England
- Other name: York Powell
- Title: Regius Professor of Modern History

Academic background
- Education: Christ Church, Oxford
- Influences: Guðbrandur Vigfússon

Academic work
- Discipline: History
- Institutions: Oriel College, Oxford
- Notable students: Charles A. Beard; R. B. Merriman
- Influenced: Percy Dearmer

Frederick York Powell (4 January 1850 – 8 May 1904) was an English historian and scholar.

== Biography ==
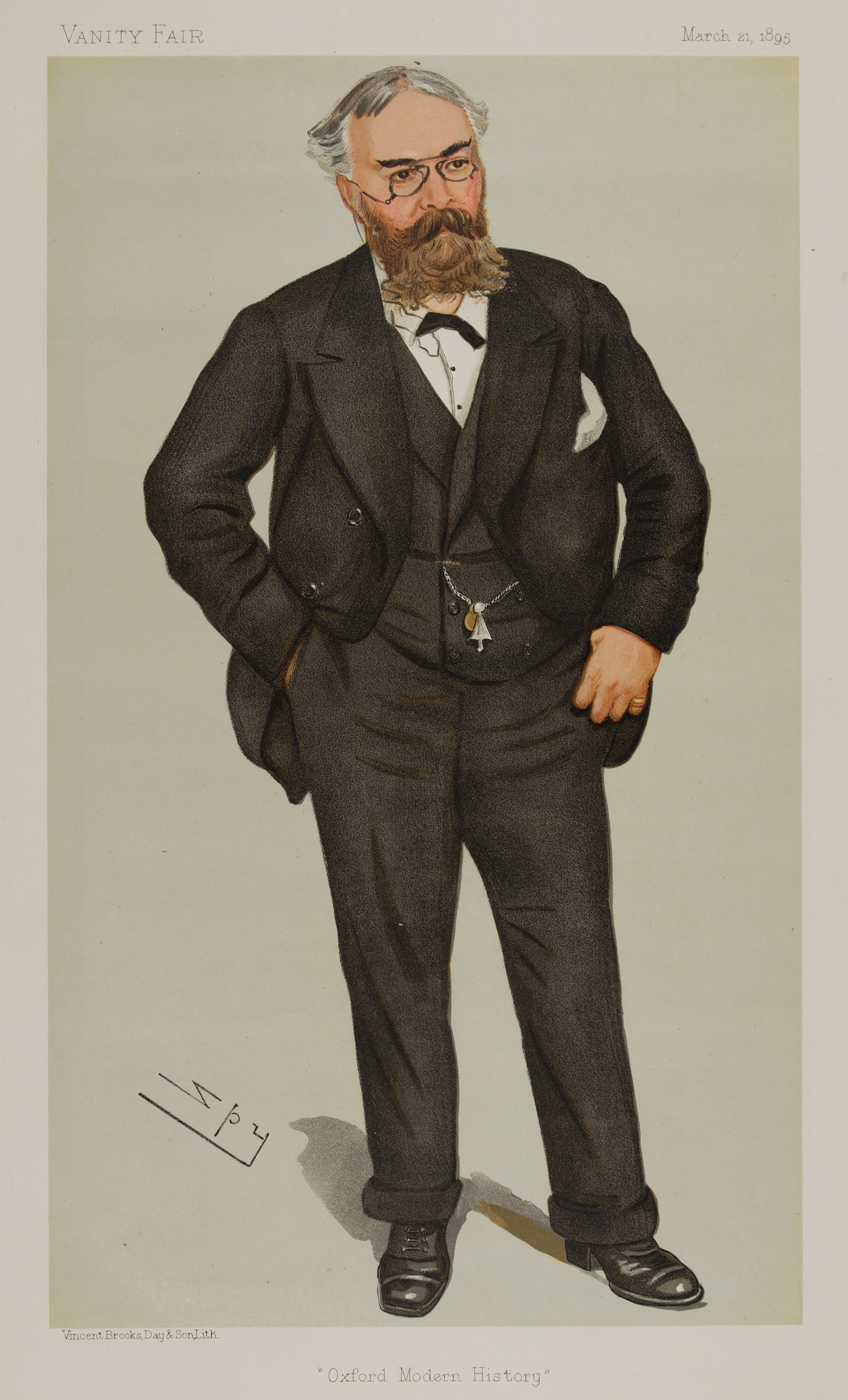
Powell as caricatured by Spy (Leslie Ward) in Vanity Fair, March 1895

He was born on 4 January 1850 at 43 Woburn Place, Bloomsbury, London, the son of Frederick Powell, a commissariat merchant, and his wife Mary Powell, daughter of Dr James Powell. He was educated at the Manor House School at Hastings, and Rugby School. He matriculated at the University of Oxford in 1868 as an unattached student, the following year joining Christ Church, where he took a first-class degree in law and modern history in 1872. Whilst at Oxford, he was a member of the exclusive Stubbs Society.

Powell was called to the bar at the Middle Temple in 1874.

He became law-lecturer and tutor of Christ Church, fellow of Oriel College, delegate of the Clarendon Press, and in 1894 he was made Regius Professor of Modern History in succession to James Anthony Froude. In June 1901 he received an honorary doctorate (LLD) from the University of Glasgow during celebrations for the university's 450th jubilee.

Powell died on 8 May 1904 at Staverton Grange, Banbury Road, Oxford, and was buried in Wolvercote. Part of his collection of artefacts were deposited at the Pitt Rivers Museum.

== Associations ==
Powell took an interest in French poetry, and Paul Verlaine, Stéphane Mallarmé, and Emile Verhaeren all lectured at Oxford under his auspices. He was also a connoisseur in Japanese art. In politics his sympathies were with the oppressed of all nationalities; he had befriended refugees after the Commune, counting among his friends Jules Vallès the author of Les Réfractaires; and he was also a friend of Stepniak and his circle.

Powell was a member of the Folklore Society and became its president in the year that he died. The society's journal, which had published his papers, printed an obituary by Edward Clodd.

== Works ==
Powell's contributions to history were not extensive, but he was a particularly stimulating teacher. He had been attracted in his school days to the study of Scandinavian history and literature, and he was closely allied with Professor Guðbrandur Vigfússon (d. 1889), whom he assisted in his Icelandic Prose Reader (1897), Corpus Poeticum Boreale (1887), and Origines Islandicae (1905), and in the editing of the Grimm Centenary papers (1886).

== Family ==
Powell married in 1874 Florence Batten (née Silke). She died in 1888. They had a daughter, Mariella.

Academic offices
Preceded by James Anthony Froude	Regius Professor of Modern History at the University of Oxford; 1894–1904	Succeeded by Charles Harding Firth
