= Brands þáttr örva =

Brands þáttr örva (The Tale of Brand the Generous) is a very short þáttr which tells how king Haraldr Sigurðarson put Brandr Vermundarson's generosity to the test. It may have been written at the end of the 13th century.

Brandr, who was nicknamed "the Generous" (inn örvi), came from Iceland to Norway. The skald Þjóðólfr Arnórsson, who was Brandr's friend, had praised him to king Haraldr, saying "that it was not clear that any other man was better suited to be king of Iceland because of his generosity and outstanding personal qualities". Haraldr then told Þjóðólfr to ask Brandr for his coat. Brandr gave it without a word. The king next asked for his axe inlaid with gold and Brandr gave it, still without uttering a word. He finally asked for his tunic. Brandr, still silent, gave it but kept one sleeve. The king said that Brandr must have cut off the sleeve of his tunic because he thought that the king had only one hand—the hand that takes, not the other hand that gives. Admitting that Brandr was wise and magnanimous, he offered him honours and presents.
