= Flateyjarbók =

Medieval Icelandic manuscript

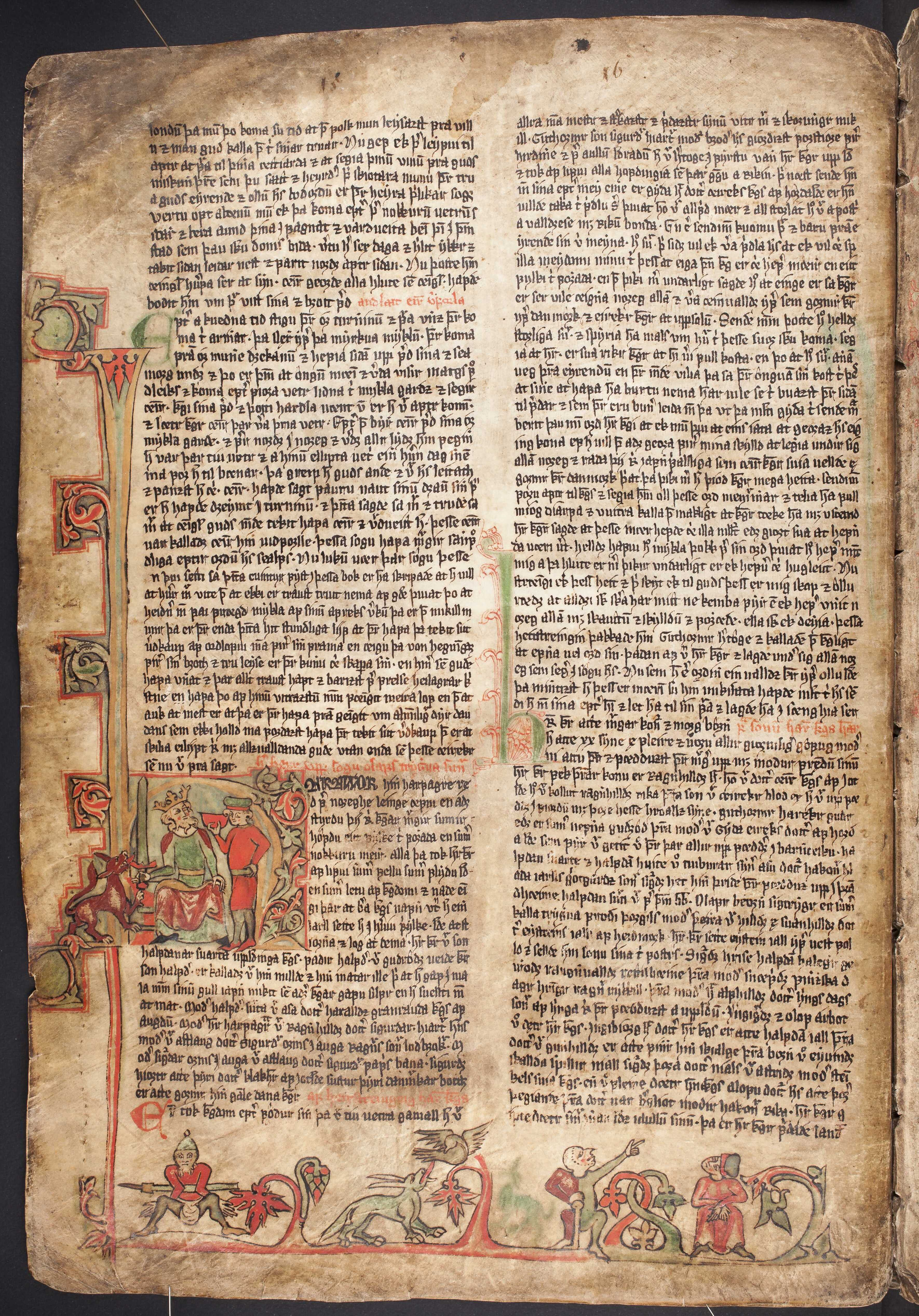
Illustrated page of Flateyjarbók, containing the end of Eiríks saga víðförla and the start of Ólafs saga Tryggvasonar.

Flateyjarbók (Icelandic pronunciation: [ˈflaːtˌeiːjarˌpouːk]; "Book of Flatey") is an important medieval Icelandic manuscript. It is also known as GkS 1005 fol. and by the Latin name Codex Flateyensis. It was commissioned by the knight and lawspeaker, Jón Hákonarson, and produced by the priests and scribes Jón Þórðarson and Magnús Þórhallsson.

== Description ==
Flateyjarbók is the largest medieval Icelandic manuscript, comprising 225 written and illustrated vellum leaves. It contains mostly sagas of the Norse kings as found in the Heimskringla, specifically the sagas about Olaf Tryggvason, St. Olaf, Sverre, Hákon the Old, Magnus the Good, and Harald Hardrada. But they appear here expanded with additional material not found elsewhere (some of it being very old) along with other unique differences. Most—but not all—of the additional material is placed within the royal sagas, sometimes interlaced. Additionally, the manuscript contains the only copy of the eddic poem Hyndluljóð, a unique set of annals from creation to 1394, and many short tales not otherwise preserved such as Nornagests þáttr ("the Story of Norna Gest").

Especially important is the Grœnlendinga saga ("History of the Greenlanders"), giving an account of the Vinland colony with some differences from the account contained in Eiríks saga rauða ("History of Eirík the Red"). Here also are preserved the only Icelandic versions of the Orkneyinga saga ("History of the Orkney Islanders") and Færeyinga saga ("History of the Faroe Islanders").

== History ==
From internal evidence the book was being written in 1387 and was completed in 1394 or very soon after. The first page states that its owner is Jón Hákonarson and that the book was scribed by two priests. One of them, Jón Þórðarson, scribed the contents from the tale of Eiríkr the Traveller down to the end of the two Olaf sagas and the other, Magnús Þórhallsson, scribed the earlier and later material and also drew the illustrations.

Further material was inserted towards the end of the 15th century.

The manuscript first received special attention by the learned in 1651 when Bishop Brynjólfur Sveinsson of Skálholt, with the permission of King Frederick III of Denmark, requested all folk of Iceland who owned old manuscripts to turn them over to the Danish king, providing either the original or a copy, either as a gift or for a price. Jon Finnsson, who resided on Flatey ('Flat Island') in the fjord of Breiðafjörður on the northwest coast of Iceland, was then the owner of the book which was already known as the Flateyjarbók. At first Jon refused to release his precious heirloom, the biggest and best book in all of Iceland, and he continued to refuse even when Bishop Brynjólfur paid him a personal visit and offered him five hundreds of land. Jon only changed his mind and bestowed the book on the bishop just as the bishop was leaving the region.

The manuscript was given as a present from Bishop Brynjólfur to King Frederick III in 1656, and placed in the Royal Library of Copenhagen. In 1662, the bishop presented the king with a second medieval manuscript, the Codex Regius (Konungsbók eddukvæða). It and Flateyjarbók survived the Copenhagen Fire of 1728 and the Second Battle of Copenhagen in 1807 and were eventually repatriated to Iceland in 1971 as Icelandic national treasures. They are preserved and studied by the Árni Magnússon Institute for Icelandic Studies.

== Contents ==
Flateyjarbók consists of the following texts:

- Geisli – a religious poem on St. Olaf II of Norway
- Ólafs ríma Haraldssonar – a poem on St. Olaf in the rímur style, the earliest such poetry
- Hyndluljóð
- A short piece from Gesta Hammaburgensis Ecclesiae Pontificum
- Sigurðar þáttr slefu
- Hversu Noregr byggðist
- Genealogies of Norwegian kings
- Eiríks saga víðförla
- Ólafs saga Tryggvasonar (en mesta), including:
  - Saga of the Greenlanders, consists of:
    - Eiríks þáttr rauða
    - Grœnlendinga þáttr (I)
  - Færeyinga saga
  - Jómsvíkinga saga
  - Otto þáttr keisara
  - Fundinn Noregr
  - Orkneyinga þáttr
  - Albani þáttr ok Sunnifu
  - Íslands bygging
  - Þorsteins þáttr uxafóts
  - Sörla þáttr
  - Stefnis þáttr Þorgilssonar
  - Rögnvalds þáttr ok Rauðs
  - Hallfreðar þáttr vandræðaskálds
  - Kjartans þáttr Ólafssonar
  - Ögmundar þáttr dytts
  - Norna-Gests þáttr
  - Helga þáttr Þórissonar
  - Þorvalds þáttr tasalda
  - Sveins þáttr ok Finns
  - Rauðs þáttr hins ramma
  - Hrómundar þáttr halta
  - Þorsteins þáttr skelks
  - Þiðranda þáttr ok Þórhalls
  - Kristni þáttr
  - Svaða þáttr ok Arnórs kerlingarnefs
  - Eindriða þáttr ilbreiðs
  - Orms þáttr Stórólfssonar
  - Hálfdanar þáttr svarta
  - Haralds þáttr hárfagra
  - Hauks þáttr hábrókar
- Ólafs saga helga, including:
  - Fóstbrœðra saga
  - Orkneyinga saga
  - Færeyinga saga
  - Nóregs konungatal
  - Haralds þáttr grenska
  - Ólafs þáttr Geirstaðaálfs
  - Styrbjarnar þáttr Svíakappa
  - Hróa þáttr heimska
  - Eymundar þáttr hrings
  - Tóka þáttr Tókasonar
  - Ísleifs þáttr biskups
  - Eymundar þáttr af Skörum
  - Eindriða þáttr ok Erlings
  - Ásbjarnar þáttr Selsbana
  - Knúts þáttr hins ríka
  - Steins þáttr Skaptasonar
  - Rauðúlfs þáttr
  - Völsa þáttr
  - Brenna Adams byskups
- Sverris saga
- Hákonar saga Hákonarsonar
- An addendum to Ólafs saga helga by Styrmir Kárason
- A saga of King Magnus the Good and King Harald Hardrada of the Morkinskinna type
- Hemings þáttr Áslákssonar
- Auðunar þáttr vestfirzka
- Sneglu-Halla þáttr
- Halldórs þáttr Snorrasonar
- Þorsteins þáttr forvitna
- Þorsteins þáttr tjaldstæðings
- Blóð-Egils þáttr
- Grœnlendinga þáttr (II) (not to be confused with the first Grœnlendinga þáttr)
- Helga þáttr ok Úlfs
- Játvarðar saga helga – Saga of King Edward
- Flateyjarannáll

== Gallery ==
Illustrations
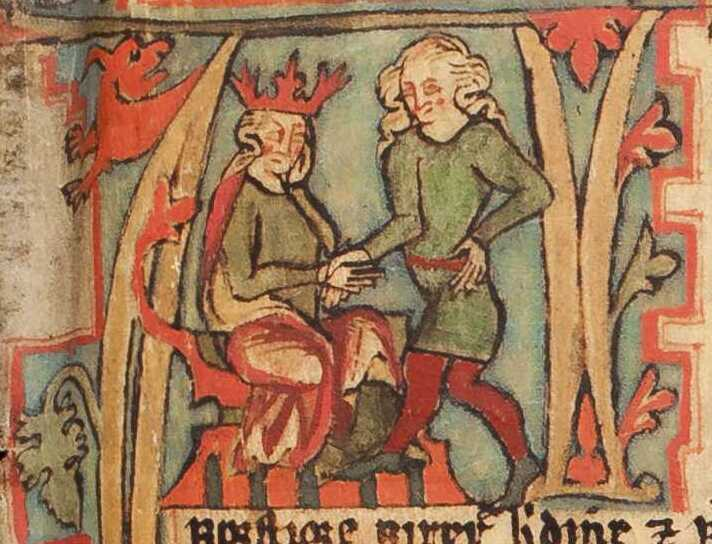
Harald Fairhair receives Norway out of his father Halfdan the Black's hands.

== Modern translations ==
Flateyjarbók is currently [when?] being translated into English by the Saga Heritage Foundation of Norway. The translator is Alison Finlay, professor of Medieval English and Icelandic Literature at Birkbeck, University of London. A Norwegian edition, translated by Edvard Eikill and comprising six volumes, was completed in 2019.

== Editions and translations ==
=== Editions ===
- Flateyjarbók, ed. by Guðbrandur Vigfússon and C.R. Unger: volume 1 (1860), volume 2 (1862), volume 3 (1868), also digitised at Heimskringla.no (diplomatic edition)
- Flateyjarbók, [ed. by Sigurður Nordal], 4 vols (Akranes: Flateyjarútgáfan, 1944–45) (normalised Old Norse spelling)

=== Translations ===
- Waggoner, Ben (2010). Sagas of Giants and Heroes. New Haven, CT: Troth Publications. ISBN 978-0578059334. (Tale of Halfdan the Black, pp. 1–10; Tale of Hauk High-Breeches, pp. 11–20)
- Flatøybok (in Norwegian). Translated by Edvard Eiki. Stavanger, Norway: Saga Bok. 2014–2019. ISBN 978-82-91640-99-0.
