= Óláfs saga Tryggvasonar en mesta =

Saga by Gunnlaugr Leifsson

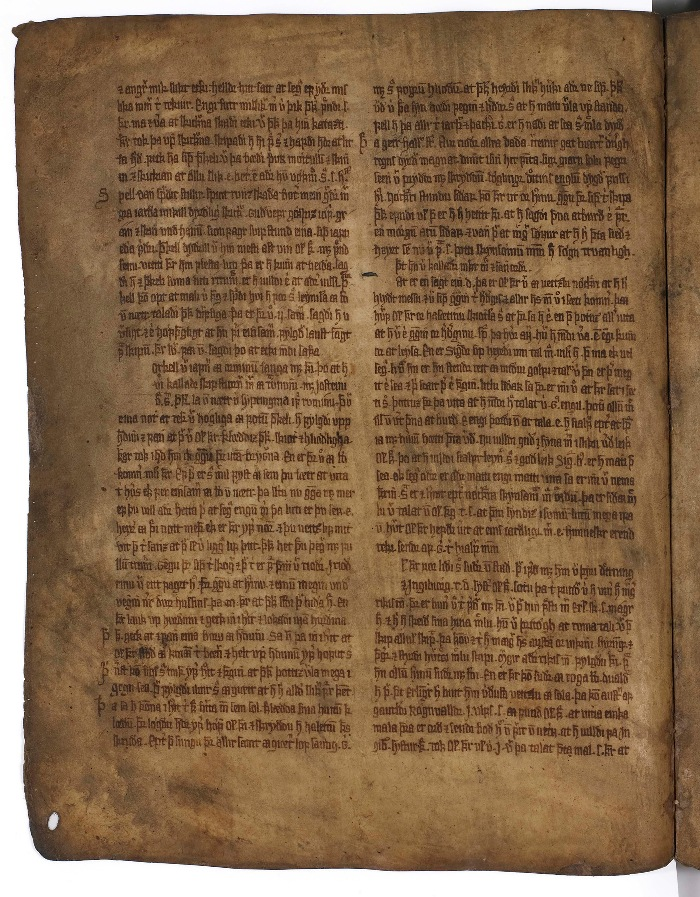
Óláfs saga Tryggvasonar AM 61 fol, bl. 64v

Óláfs saga Tryggvasonar en mesta or The Greatest Saga of Óláfr Tryggvason is generically a hybrid of different types of sagas and compiled from various sources in the fourteenth century, but is most akin to one of the kings' sagas. It is an extended biography of King Óláfr Tryggvason and relates in detail the conversion to Christianity of Óláfr Tryggvason and Hallfreðr vandræðaskáld. Composed around 1300 it takes Óláfs saga Tryggvasonar in Snorri Sturluson's Heimskringla as its base but expands the narrative greatly with content from the previous biographies of the king by Oddr Snorrason and Gunnlaugr Leifsson as well as less directly related material.

The saga is preserved in a number of manuscripts which can be divided into two groups; an earlier redaction preserved in the manuscripts AM 53 fol., AM 54 fol., AM 61 fol., Bergsbók and Húsafellsbók. The second group is a later redaction preserved in AM 62 fol. and Flateyjarbók.

The saga incorporates a number of þættir and shorter sagas, some preserved nowhere else.

== Manuscripts ==
- AM 53 fol.
- AM 54 fol.
- AM 61 fol.
- GKS 1005 fol. (Flateyjarbók)
- Stock. Perg. fol. no. 1 (Bergsbók)

== Editions ==
- Finnur Jónsson, ed. (1930). Flateyjarbók (Codex Flateyensis: MS No 1005 fol. in the Old Royal Collection in the Royal Library of Copenhagen. Copenhagen: Levin & Munksgaard.
- Lindblad, Gustaf, ed. (1963). Bergsbók: Perg. fol. nr. 1 in the Royal Library, Stockholm. Copenhagen: Rosenhilde and Bagger.
- Ólafur Halldórsson, ed. (1958–61). Ólafs saga Tryggvasonar en mesta. Editiones Arnamagnæanæ, Ser. A. Vol. 1–2. Copenhagen: Munksgaard. pp. 313–322.
- Ólafur Halldórsson, ed. (1982). The great saga of Olaf Tryggvason and Olaf the Saint: AM 61 fol. Copenhagen: Rosenkilde and Bagger.

== See also ==
- Óláfs saga Tryggvasonar, for other versions of the king's saga
- Óláfsdrápa Tryggvasonar, poem in the Bergsbók
