= Grœnlendinga þáttr (I) =

Medieval Icelandic tale

Grœnlendinga þáttr ('The Tale of the Greenlanders') is a short story about the exploration of Vinland in North America by Leif Erikson and later Norse explorers, including Thorvald Eiriksson, Thorfinn Karlsefni, and Freydís Eiríksdóttir.

The tale is preserved in the Flateyjarbók, in columns 281–288, where it is interpolated into the Saga of Óláfr Tryggvason. It is commonly combined and translated with Eiríks þáttr rauða as the Saga of the Greenlanders.

== Translations ==
English translations of Grœnlendinga þáttr (I) can be found in:

- Reeves, Arthur Middleton, The Finding of Wineland the Good: The History of the Icelandic Discovery of America, London: Henry Frowde, Oxford University Press, 1890 (pages 64–78)
- Royal Danish General Staff, Topographical Department, Flateyjarbok. The "Flatey book", Copenhagen, 1893 (pages 281–288)
