= Guðbrandur Vigfússon =

Icelandic scholar

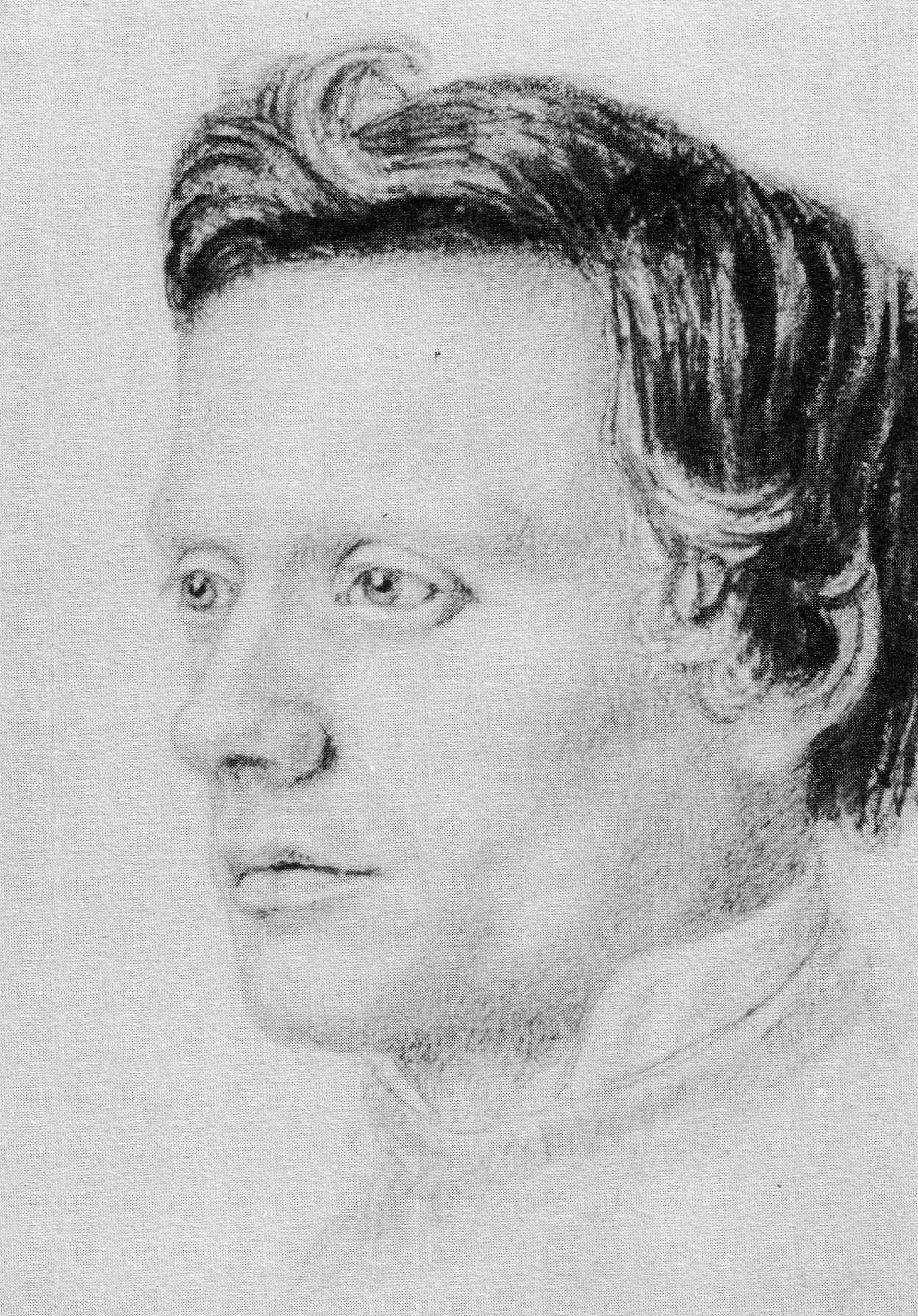
A portrait of Guðbrandur Vigfússon by Sigurður málari.

Guðbrandur Vigfússon, known in English as Gudbrand Vigfusson, (13 March 1827 – 31 January 1889) was one of the foremost Scandinavian scholars of the 19th century.

== Life ==
He was born into an Icelandic family in Breiðafjörður. He was brought up, until he went to a tutor's, by his kinswoman Kristín Vigfússdóttir, to whom, he records, he owed not only that he became a man of letters but 'almost everything.' He was sent to the old school at Bessastaðir and (when it moved there) at Reykjavík. In 1849, already a fair scholar, he came to Copenhagen University in the Regense College, where as an Icelander, he received four-years free boarding under the Garðsvist system.

After his student course, he was appointed stipendiarius by the Arna-Magnaean trustees, and worked for fourteen years in the Arna-Magnaean Library. He later said that he knew every scrap of old vellum and of Icelandic written paper in that whole collection.

In 1866, he settled in Oxford, which he made his home for the rest of his life. He held the office of Reader in Scandinavian at Oxford University, a post created for him, from 1884 until his death. He was made a Jubilee Doctor of Uppsala in 1877, and received the Danish Order of the Dannebrog in 1885.

Guðbrandur died of cancer on 31 January 1889. He was buried in St. Sepulchre's Cemetery, Oxford, on 3 February 1889.

== Work ==
He was an skilled judge of literature, reading most European languages well and being acquainted with their classics. His memory was noted, and if the Eddic poems had ever been lost, he could have written them all down from memory. He spoke English well, with a strong Icelandic accent. He wrote a distinctive and clear hand, in spite of (or because of) the thousands of lines of manuscript copying he had done in his early life.

His Tímatal (written between October 1854 and April 1855) laid the foundations for the chronology of Icelandic history. His editions of Icelandic classics (1858–1868), Biskupa sögur, Bárðar Saga, Fornsögur (with Mobius), Eyrbyggia Saga and Flateyjarbók (with Carl Rikard Unger) opened a new era of Icelandic scholarship. They can be compared to the Rolls Series editions of chronicles by William Stubbs, for the interest and value of their prefaces and texts.

He spent the seven years 1866–1873 on the Oxford Icelandic-English Dictionary, often denoted by the shorthand "Cleasby-Vigfusson", the best guide to classic Icelandic, and a monumental example of single-handed work. The end-product was more a product of Guðbrandur Vigfússon's undertaking than Cleasby's, and is characterized as his most important legacy.

His later series of editions (1874–1885) included Orkneyinga Saga and Hákonar Saga, the great and complex mass of Icelandic historical sagas known as Sturlunga, and the Corpus Poeticum Boreale, in which he edited the entire body of classic Scandinavian poetry. As an introduction to the Sturlunga, he wrote a complete, concise history of the classic Northern literature and its sources. In the introduction to the Corpus, he laid the foundations of a critical history of the Eddic poetry and Court poetry of the North in a series of well-supported theories.

His little Icelandic Prose Reader (with F. York Powell) (1879) furnishes a path to a sound knowledge of Icelandic. The Grimm Centenary (1886) gives good examples of the range of his historic work, while his Appendix on Icelandic currency to Sir G. W. Dasent's Burnt Njal is a methodical investigation into an intricate subject.

As a writer in his own tongue, he once gained a high position by his Relations of Travel in Norway and South Germany. In English, as his Visit to Grimm and his powerful letters to The Times show, he had attained no mean skill. His life is mainly a record of well-directed and efficient labor in Denmark and Oxford.

== Literature ==
- Hans Fix: Gudbrand Vigfusson, Hugo Gering, and German Scholarship: Or, A Friendship Destroyed. in Frederic Amory in Memoriam. Old Norse-Icelandic Studies, edd. John Lindow & George Clark. Berkeley - Los Angeles: North Pinehurst Press 2015, S. 269–302. ISBN 978-0692520161
