= Morkinskinna =

Old Norse saga written around 1220

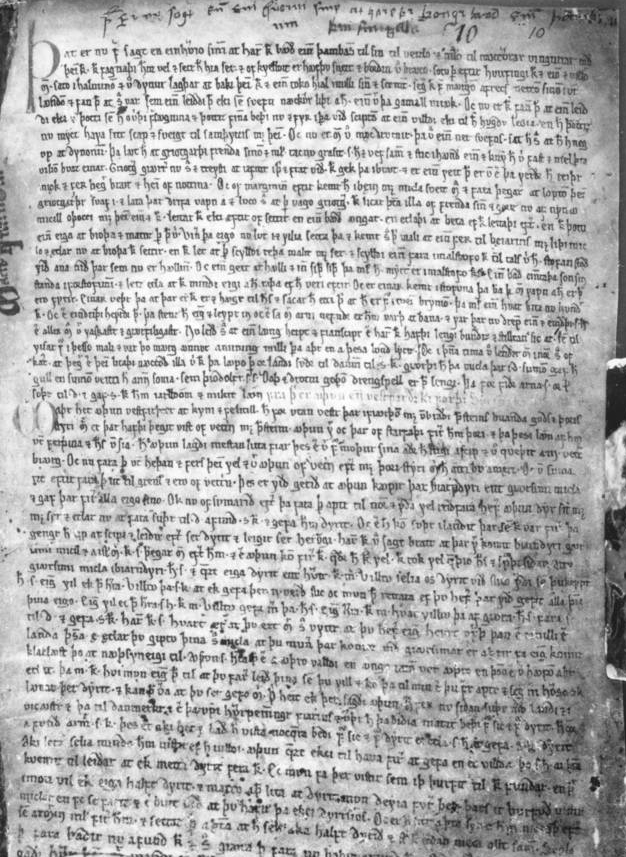
A folio of Morkinskinna manuscript

Morkinskinna is an Old Norse kings' saga, relating the history of Norwegian kings from approximately 1025 to 1157. The saga was written in Iceland around 1220, and has been preserved in a manuscript from around 1275.

The name Morkinskinna means "mouldy parchment" and is originally the name of the manuscript book in which the saga has been preserved. The book itself, GKS 1009 fol, is currently in the Royal Danish Library in Copenhagen. It was brought to Denmark from Iceland by Þormóður Torfason (Tormod Torfæus) in 1662.

The saga was published in English in 2000 in a translation by Theodore M. Andersson and Kari Ellen Gade.

== Contents ==
The saga starts in 1025 or 1026 and in its received form, ends suddenly in 1157, after the death of King Sigurðr II. Originally, the work may have been longer, possibly continuing until 1177, when the narratives of Fagrskinna and Heimskringla, which use Morkinskinna as one of their sources, end. Apart from giving the main saga, the text is lavishly interspersed with citations from skaldic verse (about 270 stanzas) and includes a number of short Icelandic tales known as þættir. The following is an overview of the chapters in Morkinskinna, chronologically subdivided by the reigns of the kings of Norway:

=== Magnús I (r. 1035-1047) ===
1. Here begins the saga of Magnús and Haraldr [his uncle]
2. Concerning Sveinn
3. Concerning King Magnús's feasts
4. Concerning King Magnús
5. Concerning the declaration of war against Magnús and concerning the Duke
6. King Magnús in Jutland
7. King Magnús's stay in Jutland
8. How King Haraldr set sail when he came to Skáney
9. Concerning Haraldr's travels
10. Concerning Norðbrikt [=Haraldr]'s travels
11. Concerning a declaration of war
12. Concerning the raids of Norðbrikt and jarl Gyrgir
13. Haraldr's journey to Jerusalem
14. Concerning King Magnús's meeting with Haraldr
15. The slandering of Þorkell
16. Concerning King Magnús
17. How King Magnús bestowed a jarldom on Ormr
18. On the dispute between the kings
19. Concerning the kings
20. Concerning Þorsteinn Hallsson
21. Concerning the kings
22. The good counsels of King Haraldr
23. Concerning King Magnús and Margrét
24. Hreiðars þáttr ["The tale of Hreiðarr"]
25. How the kings harried and how the king's mother granted a captive his life
26. King Magnús dies [1047]
27. Haraldr's thingmeeting
28. King Magnús's funeral voyage

=== Haraldr III (r. 1047-1066) ===
29. Haraldr's thingmeeting
30. Halldórs þáttr Snorrasonar
31. [On King Haraldr's campaign in Denmark]
32. Concerning King Haraldr
33. Concerning the disagreement between the king and Einarr Þambarskelfir
34. Concerning an Icelander
35. Concerning King Haraldr's wise counsels
36. How Auðunn from the Westfjords brought King Sveinn a bear [Auðunar þáttr vestfirzka]
37. Concerning King Haraldr and the Upplanders
38. Concerning King Haraldr and Brandr örvi (the Open-Handed)
39. Concerning King Haraldr
40. Concerning the storytelling of an Icelander [Íslendings þáttr sögufróða]
41. Concerning Þorvarðr krákunel's gift of a sail to King Haraldr
42. Concerning King Haraldr and Hákon
43. Sneglu-Halla þáttr.
44. [The king encounters a man in a boat]
45. [Concerning King Haraldr and a dear friend of Tryggvi Óláfsson]
46. [Concerning Gizurr Ísleifsson]
47. Concerning Stúfr enn blindi
48. Concerning Oddr Ófeigsson
49. How it came about that King Haraldr journeyed to the West
50. The treachery against King Haraldr
51. Óláfr Haraldsson's return to Norway
52. The death of King Harold Godwinson [1066]

=== Óláfr III (r. 1067-1093) ===
53. The saga of King Óláfr kyrri "the Quiet"
54. Concerning King Óláfr and the Kráku-karl (Crow Man)

=== Magnús III (r. 1093-1103) ===
55. The Saga of King Magnús berfœttr
56. Concerning King Magnús and Sveinki Steinarsson
57. Concerning King Magnús's harrying
58. Concerning King Magnús
59. Concerning King Magnús's death

=== Sigurðr I, Óláfr and Eysteinn I (r. 1103-1130) ===
60. The beginning of the rule of King Magnús's sons
61. The story of King Sigurðr's adventures
62. Concerning the gifts of Emperor Kirjalax (Alexius I Komnenos)
63. Concerning King Sigurðr's feast
64. Concerning King Eysteinn
65. Concerning King Eysteinn and Ívarr
66. Concerning the king's genealogies
67. Concerning King Sigurðr's dream
68. The dealings of King Eysteinn and Ingimarr with Ásu-Þórðr
69. The death of King Óláfr Magnússon [1115]
70. An account of legal dealings between King Sigurðr and King Eysteinn (Þinga saga)
71. The contest of the kings
72. Concerning Þórarinn stuttfeldr
73. Concerning the death of King Eysteinn [1123]
74. Concerning King Sigurðr and Óttarr
75. Concerning King Sigurðr and Erlendr
76. Concerning Haraldr gilli
77. Concerning King Sigurðr and Áslák hani (Rooster)
78. Concerning King Sigurðr
79. Concerning the bet between Magnús and Haraldr
80. Concerning King Sigurðr and Bishop Magni
81. The Death of King Sigurðr [1130]

=== Haraldr IV (r. 1130-6) and Magnús IV (r. 1130-5, 1137-9) ===
82. Concerning Haraldr and Magnús
83. The gifts of King Haraldr to Bishop Magnús
84. The story of Sigurðr slembidjákn
85. Concerning Sigurðr slembir
86. The slaying of King Haraldr [by Sigurðr slembidjákn in 1136]
87. Concerning King Sigurðr slembir

=== Sigurðr II (1136-1155) ===
88. Concerning King Haraldr's sons
89. Concerning Sigurðr
90. Concerning King Sigurðr slembir
91. King Ingi's letter
92. Concerning Sigurðr slembir
93. Concerning King Sigurðr slembir
94. The slaying of Óttarr birtingr
95. [no title]
96. Concerning King Sigurðr
97. Concerning King Eysteinn
98. The slaying of Geirsteinn
99. [no title]
100. Concerning the death of King Sigurðr [1155]

== Primary sources ==
- Finnur Jónsson (ed.). Morkinskinna. Copenhagen: Samfund til udgivelse af gammel nordisk litteratur, 1932. Available online from Septentrionalia.
- Ármann Jakobsson and Þórður Ingi Guðjónsson (eds.). Morkinskinna I-II. Íslenzk fornrit 23–24. Reykjavík: Hið íslenzka fornritafélag, 2011.
- Andersson, Theodore Murdock and Kari Ellen Gade (trs.). Morkinskinna: The Earliest Icelandic Chronicle of the Norwegian Kings (1030-1157). Islandica 51. Ithaca: Cornell University Press, 2000. With introduction. ISBN 0-8014-3694-X
