= Einar Ragnarsson Kvaran =

Icelandic engineer, teacher, genealogist and writer

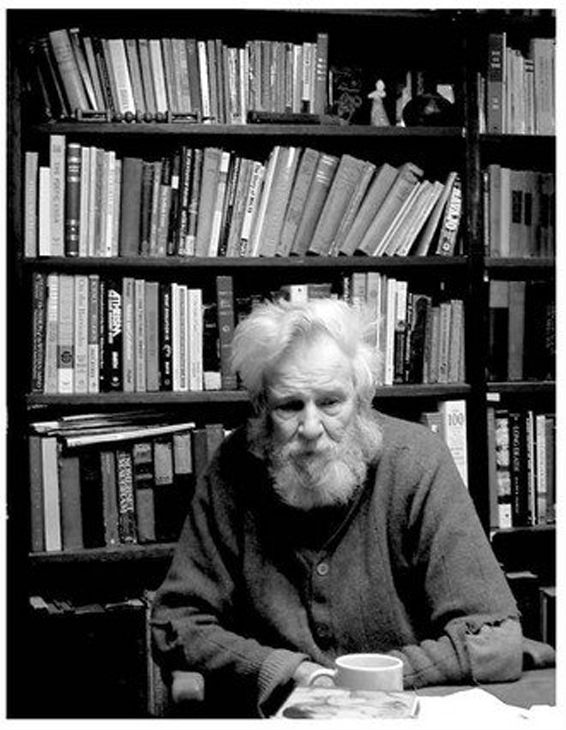
Einar at home, age 89

Einar Ragnarsson Kvaran (November 19, 1920 – December 13, 2012) was an Icelandic engineer, teacher, genealogist and writer. He lived in America much of the latter part of his life and was the author of the Our Ancestors newspaper series.

== Early life ==
Einar was born in Reykjavík, Iceland, the son of Ragnar Einarsson Kvaran and Thorunn Kvaran and the grandson of Hannes and Ragnheidur Hafstein and Einar Hjörleifsson Kvaran and Gíslína Gíslinadóttir. During his childhood the family moved to Gimli, Manitoba, Canada and then to Árborg, where his father was the minister of the Unitarian Church from 1930 to 1933 and the publisher of the Icelandic newspaper Morgunblaðið.

After his family returned to Reykjavík in 1933, Einar attended Menntaskólinn í Reykjavík, one of the oldest institutions in Iceland, founded in 1056, where he was the Inspector Scholae in 1940. His grandfather, Hannes Hafstein, had been the school's first Inspector Scholae in 1879.

Following his graduation he attended the University of California at Berkeley in the United States, where he graduated in 1945 with a degree in Marine Engineering. While at that school he met and married Clara Caldwell (Note: (July 15, 1922 - May 11, 2016)) on October 21, 1944, and after finishing his studies returned to Iceland, where he was employed at the Icelandic State Herring and Meal Factory in Siglufjörður. His first three sons were born there.

== United Nations career ==
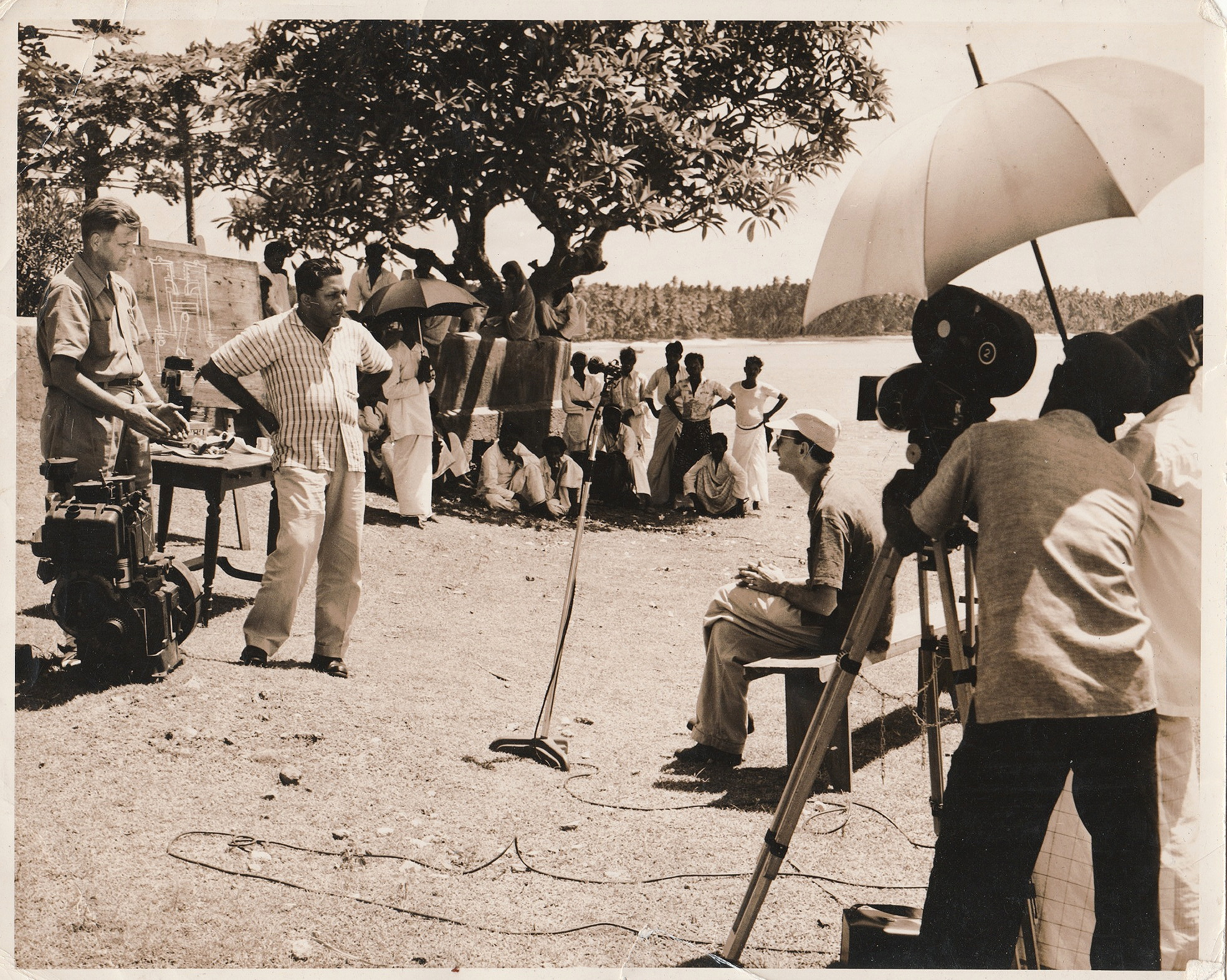
Einar, far left, being filmed by a United Nations film crew, Sri Lanka, ca. 1956

In 1952 Einar was employed by the Food and Agriculture Organization of the United Nations and was posted to Sri Lanka (at that time, "Ceylon") where his fourth son was born. This was followed by postings in the Philippines, Indonesia, Malta and finally at FAO headquarters in Rome, Italy.

== Later life ==
He retired in 1980 and moved to Pueblo, Colorado, US to be with his wife's family. There, in 1997 he became a US citizen. "I wanted to vote ... I'm from Iceland. About the time we were having elections here, they were having elections in Iceland. I realized that I was more interested in the presidential elections here than in Iceland. That pushed me towards citizenship." While in Colorado he worked for the Volunteer Income Tax Assistance program, helping people file their tax forms. Einar and Clara became a fixture at the Pueblo Meals on Wheels program.

When Steve Nawrocki, director of the program "said goodbye to Meals on Wheels drivers Einar and Clara Kvaran," he wondered "how many volunteers it would take to replace them. The two have delivered meals to homebound Puebloans for 17 years calling off for only a few vacations and the occasional surgery. They have been around longer than I have. It is volunteers like them that make a program like this possible."

After twenty years in Pueblo he moved again, to Sun City, Arizona. He was a member of the Association of Former International Civil Servants.

During the 1990s Einar, who had a lifelong interest in genealogy, began contributing articles about "famous" Icelanders of the past, all of whom were ancestors and relations, to Lögberg-Heimskringla, an Icelandic and English newspaper published in Winnipeg, Manitoba, Canada. The paper was created by joining two Icelandic newspapers, both co-founded in the 1880s by his grandfather, Einar Hjörleifsson.

Before he died Einar requested that some of his ashes be spread in the Hvalvatn area, where he spent summers as a youth serving as a fishing guide and a horse handler. He died on December 13, 2012.

== Selected publications ==
- The Mechanization of the Inshore Fisheries and the relationship to Fisheries Development in Ceylon, The Development of Ceylon's Fisheries (A Symposium), Printed From Bulletin of the Fisheries Research Station, Ceylon, Vol. 17, No.2, Printed at the Government Press Ceylon, 1965
- The Effect of Labor Costs on Investment and Management Patterns in the Fishing Industry, Food and Agriculture Organization of the United Nations, International Conference on Investment in Fisheries, Rome, Italy, 1969
- Marine Fisheries Potential in the Philippines and South East Asia, Marine Science Seminar, Xavier University, June 17–20, 1971, Cagayan de Oro, Philippines, pp 45–54

=== Lögberg-Heimskringla publications ===
Einar published a series of articles entitled Our Ancestors about significant Icelanders of the past, populating it with figures such as "Killer Glumur", "Unnur the Deepminded", "Olafur Peacock", "Ulfur the Cross-eyed", "Thorstein the Handsome", "Thorkell Badmouth" and Ketill the flat-nosed.

In the introduction to the Our Ancestors series Einar describes it as not "a history of Iceland" but "more like a family photo album from which most of the snapshots have been lost".

- Ari Magnusson. (Note: Lögberg-Heimskringla, February 24, 1989 p.6)
- 14th century custom adopted. (Note: Lögberg-Heimskringla, March 31, 1989 p.7)
- Melkorka. (Note: Lögberg-Heimskringla, April 7, 1989 p.7)
- Floki Viltharson. (Note: Lögberg-Heimskringla, April 21, 1989 p.6)
- Thorbjorg Olafsdottir. (Note: Lögberg-Heimskringla, May 12, 1989 p.3)
- Bjorn Einarsson. (Note: Lögberg-Heimskringla, May 19, 1989 p.5)
- Thordis Thorbjarnadottir. (Note: Lögberg-Heimskringla, June 2, 1989 p.3)
- Ingolfur Arnarson. (Note: Lögberg-Heimskringla, June 7, 1989 p.6)
- Snorri Sturluson. (Note: Lögberg-Heimskringla, June 23, 1989 p.7)
- Helgi Eyvindsson. (Note: Lögberg-Heimskringla, October 6, 1989 p.5)
- Geirmundur Hjorsson. (Note: Lögberg-Heimskringla, October 13, 1989 p.4)
- Oddi Helgason. (Note: Lögberg-Heimskringla, October 27, 1989 p.7)
- Saemunder Jonsson. (Note: Lögberg-Heimskringla, November 24, 1989 p.2)
- Thorgeir Thorkelsson. (Note: Lögberg-Heimskringla, December 1, 1989 p.3)
- Sturla Thordarson. (Note: Lögberg-Heimskringla, December 8, 1989 p.6)
- Isleifur Gissurason. (Note: Lögberg-Heimskringla, December 15, 1989 p.6)
- Kveldulfur Bjalfason. (Note: Lögberg-Heimskringla, March 30, 1990 p.5)
- Glumur Eyjolfsson. (Note: Lögberg-Heimskringla, January 26, 1990 p.7)
- Eyjolfur Ingjaldsson. (Note: Lögberg-Heimskringla, February 2, 1990 p.6)
- Skallgrimur Kvaldulfsson. (Note: Lögberg-Heimskringla, February 9, 1990 p.8)
- Egill Skallagrimsson. (Note: Lögberg-Heimskringla, April 6, 1990 p.6)
- Asgerdur Bjarnardottir. (Note: Lögberg-Heimskringla, May 11, 1990 p.7)
- Thorgerdur Egilsddottir. (Note: Lögberg-Heimskringla, May 25, 1990 p.6)
- Guthrun Osvifursdottir. (Note: Lögberg-Heimskringla, September 28, 1990 p. 7)
- Haflidi Masson. (Note: Lögberg-Heimskringla, October 12, 1990)
- Unnur Ketilsdottir. (Note: Lögberg-Heimskringla, November 23, 1990 p.4)
- Guthrithur Thorbjarnardottir. (Note: Lögberg-Heimskringla, January 25, 1991 p. 2)
- Einar Eyjolfsson. (Note: Lögberg-Heimskringla, February 1, 1991 p. 3)
- Ari Masson. (Note: Lögberg-Heimskringla, September 13, 1991 p.7)
- Thorstein Olvisson. (Note: Lögberg-Heimskringla, September 20, 1991 p.6)
- Halldor Snorrason. (Note: Lögberg-Heimskringla, December 13, 1991 p.11)
- Olafur Hoskuldsson. (Note: Lögberg-Heimskringla, February 14, 1992 p.7)
- Thorkell Thorgeirsson. (Note: Lögberg-Heimskringla, April 17, 1992)
- Thorkell Thorgeirsson (part 2). (Note: Lögberg-Heimskringla, April 22, 1992, p.7, continued from, previous edition)
- Jon Arason, Ancestor of us all? (Note: Lögberg-Heimskringla, January 22, 1993 p. 2-3)

== See also ==
- List of Icelandic writers
- Icelanders
- Demographics of Iceland
