= Vatnshyrna =

Lost Icelandic manuscript

Vatnshyrna was a major Icelandic saga codex destroyed in the Copenhagen Fire of 1728. It was copied between 1391 and 1395 by Magnús Þórhallsson for Jón Hákonarson in northern Iceland. The codex was first called Vatnshyrna by Arngrímur Jónsson in his 1609 work, Crymogaea, possibly because it was located at that time at Stóra Vatnshorn.

Arngrímur refers to the codex containing the texts of Kjalnesinga saga, Þórðar saga hreðu, and Bárðar saga Snæfellsáss. A large part of the manuscript subsequently became part of Peder Resen's manuscript collection, and in 1675 this portion of the codex passed to Copenhagen University Library. At this point, the manuscript contained the following texts:

- Flóamanna saga
- Laxdæla saga
- Hænsna-Þóris saga
- Vatnsdæla saga
- Eyrbyggja saga
- Kjalnesinga saga
- Króka-Refs saga
- Stjörnu-Odda draumr
- Bergbúa þáttr
- Kumlbúa þáttr
- Draumr Þorsteins Síðu-Hallssonar

Although destroyed in the fire, copies of all these texts, apart from Króka-Refs saga, had been made by Árni Magnússon and Ásgeir Jónsson. Margaret Clunies Ross has suggested that the manuscript's contents represent the compiler's "taste for the marvellous and the supernatural".

A related codex, Pseudo-Vatnshyrna, which was compiled in the same area and at the same time (c. 1390) as Vatnshyrna survives as fragments in AM 445b 4to, AM 445c 4to and AM 564a 4to. It contained at least the following texts:

- Landnámabók (Melabók text)
- Vatnsdæla saga
- Flóamanna saga
- Eyrbyggja saga
- Bárðar saga Snæfellsáss
- Þórðar saga hreðu
- Bergbúa þáttr
- Kumlbúa þáttr
- Draumr Þorsteins Síðu-Hallssonar
- Gísla saga
- Víga-Glúms saga
- Harðar saga ok Hólmverja
