= Ögmundar þáttr dytts =

Short story

Ögmundar þáttr dytts ok Gunnars helmings is an Icelandic þáttr in two parts: the story of Ǫgmundr dyttr, a cousin of Víga-Glúmr, and the adventures in Sweden of a Norwegian called Gunnarr helmingr, who takes advantage of observances in the cult of Freyr.

== Context and date ==
The þáttr occurs in Óláfs saga Tryggvasonar en mesta, a compendious saga of King Olaf Tryggvason composed at the start of the 14th century, and in a shorter form in the Vatnshyrna manuscripts of Víga-Glúms saga, indicating it was composed prior to the mid-13th century.

== Summary ==
While visiting Norway, Ǫgmundr dyttr, an Icelander who is a cousin of Víga-Glúmr from Víga-Glúms saga, accidentally sinks the ship of Hallvarðr, a favourite of Jarl Hákon, who punishes him with an insulting injury. Egged on by Glúmr to avenge himself and restore the family honour, Ǫgmundr returns to Norway two years later, after the heathen jarl has been succeeded as ruler by the Christian King Olaf Tryggvason, and kills Hallvarðr; but first he exchanges cloaks with a Norwegian called Gunnarr helmingr, thereby framing him for the killing. He then returns to Iceland. Gunnarr takes refuge in Sweden, where he finds a young woman who is a cult bride of Freyr about to set out on an autumnal progress through the countryside in a cart with a wooden image embodying her husband. After a blizzard in the mountains causes the rest of the procession to give up, he takes over the task of leading the draft animal pulling the cart. When he sits down in the cart to rest, the woman upbraids him and Freyr attacks him; initially outmatched, Gunnarr recalls the king and Christianity and calls out for divine aid, after which he is able to vanquish Freyr, who is revealed to be a demon, and destroy the wooden image. He then puts on its clothing and decorations and takes Freyr's place in the cart, asking the devotees at each stop for valuable gifts instead of sacrifices and participating in their feasts, both of which please them, and impregnates the woman, which is also taken as very propitious. A good agricultural season ensues. King Olaf sends Gunnarr's brother to bring him back to Norway, and he returns with a fortune and the Swedish priestess, who is baptised Christian.

== Significance ==
Although disparaging of heathenism and the Swedes, the Gunnarr helmingr story is evidence of seasonal processions of a deity in a cart as a fertility ritual, echoing Tacitus' account in Germania of the cult of Nerthus. Such processions may have been particularly part of the worship of the Vanir; the name Nerthus is cognate with that of Freyr's father in Old Norse texts, Njǫrðr. It may also indicate sacred marriage of priestesses with Freyr. Gunnarr's deception has been compared to Nectanebus's subterfuge in the Romance of Alexander, siring Alexander the Great while pretending to be the god Amon, with the implication that it is based on an imported narrative motif rather than on memories of heathen practices, but it differs in that the priestess is not deceived.

The story is one of several "conversion þættir" in the saga that emphasize heathenism as folly and deception by devils. The section on Gunnarr's adventures in Sweden begins with an account of how the Swedes' sacrifices to Freyr and reverence for his statue had empowered the devil to speak to them through it. It is often treated as a loose concatenation of two separate stories, but Joseph Harris has argued that it is "an artistically successful, coherent novella" woven together by "an 'author' of skill and discernment". He and Anne Heinrichs, who pointed to Gunnarr's nickname, which means "half-one", both argue for a unifying theme of identity.
