= Rings in early Germanic cultures =

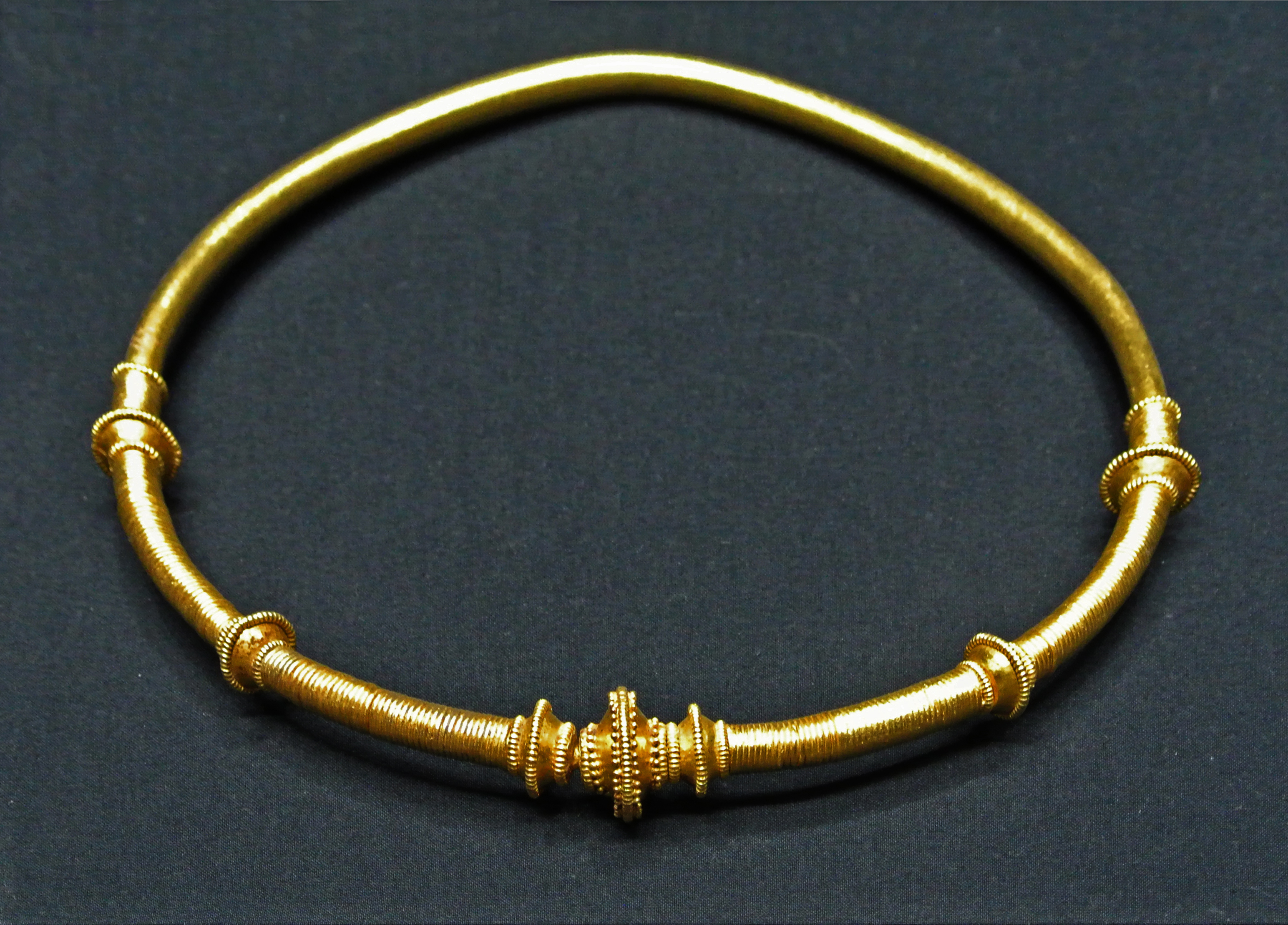
Neck ring with plug clasp from the Treasure of Osztrópataka displayed at the Kunsthistorisches Museum in Vienna, Austria.

Rings held a prominent position in early Germanic cultures, appearing both in archaeology throughout areas settled by Germanic peoples, and in textual sources discussing their practices and beliefs. They are notably associated with the related aspects of wealth, being used as forms of currency in the Early Medieval Period, and swearing sacred oaths, often dedicated to, or witnessed by, the gods. The sacrality of rings is reflected in Germanic mythology and ring bestowal held a central role in maintaining functional relationships between rulers and their retinues. The cultural roles of rings continued to varying extents during and after the Christianisation of the Germanic peoples, such as in gift-bestowal and oath-swearing.

== Archaeological record ==
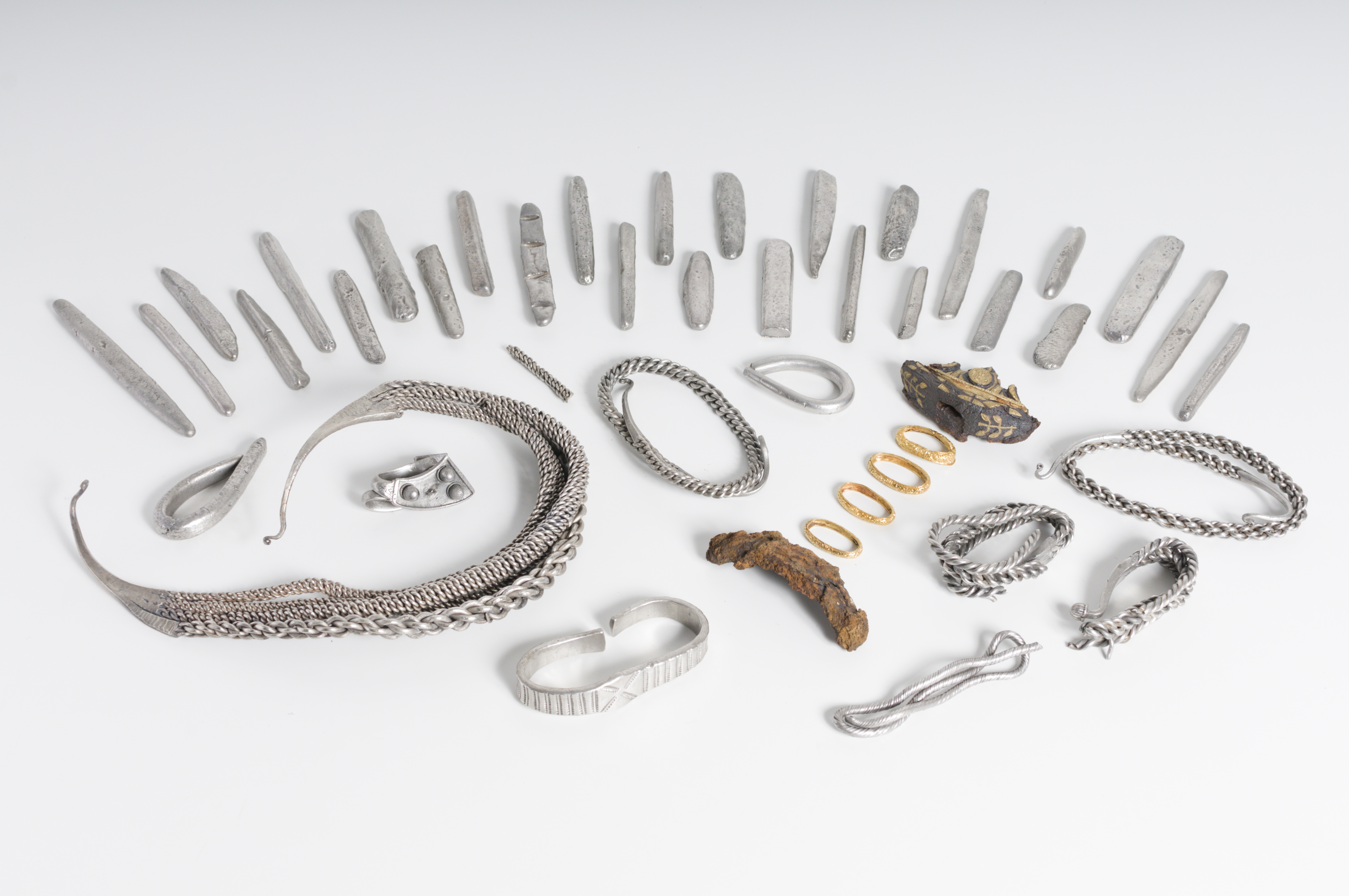
The Bedale Hoard, discovered in Bedale in North Yorkshire in 2012, featuring a number of rings.

Arm, finger and neck rings dating to the Early Medieval Period have been found in hoards throughout Northern Europe, such as the Spillings Hoard in Gotland and the Silverdale Hoard in Lancashire. Artistic styles varied with region and time, with new styles arising through formation of mixed cultural groups, such as the development of Hiberno-Scandinavian forms through the Scandinavian settlement of Ireland.

Rings are also depicted, both in picture stones, often on those relating to the story of Sigurð like the Drävle runestone, and on bracteates dating to the migration era.

Anglo-Saxon runic finger rings have been found in England dating from the 8th–11th centuries CE. Some of the inscriptions can be translated, often denoting ownership, however some do not appear to form words and consequently have been interpreted as magic formulae. Single runes are often used consecutively in multiples of 3. It has been suggested that finger rings were uncommon in England during the 5th–6th centuries CE with both men and women, however their popularity increased in the 10th–11th centuries, when they became relatively more popular among women. These finger rings are typically made of silver or gold, although bronze and lead have also been found, and can have settings for gems or coloured glass; in the case of the Wheatley Hill rings, the settings seem to have been added after the inscription as it partially obscures the runes. Explicitly Christian inscriptions are common, representing approximately one third of total inscriptions, consistent with Exeter Book riddles 48 and 59, however this is lower than the average across all media in England for this period.

== Role ==
=== Wealth ===
==== Integration into trading systems ====
Neck rings are described in Ibn Fadlan's account of the Rus' people, where women wear a number of silver or gold rings, each worth 10,000 dirhams in metal, as a form of portable wealth; the precise value has been suggested to be an exaggeration due to the impracticality of the high weight. Contemporary to this, in Scandinavia and areas with significant Scandinavian influence such as Britain and Ireland, arm and bullion rings were used in the same manner for hacksilver, where they would be cut up and used in financial transactions. These rings often show nicks which are commonly attributed to metal purity checks. The weights of intact arm and neck rings are always multiples of mercantile units, further supporting their usage as a form of wearable currency. Consistent with the Rus' rings being standardised in line with a value of dirhams, in Sweden, weights have been found that are integers of both Scandinavian and Islamic units, suggesting an integration of the trading systems; dirhams have also been found in both England and Scandinavia dating to the Early medieval period, which would have been used as part of the bullion economy or melted down into ingots. Similarly, the economic value of rings is attested on the Prose Edda account of Fróði's Peace when a golden ring is lain down on Jelling heath without being stolen, as a demonstration of the lack of law-breaking in the period.

==== Gifting ====
Giving of rings is a central responsibility of kings in Anglo-Saxon societies, as described in Maxims II:

Sweord sceal on bearme,
drihtlic isern. Draca sceal on hlæwe,
frod, frætwum wlanc. Fisc sceal on wætere
cynren cennan. Cyning sceal on healle
beagas dælan.

— Old English text
Translation:

The sword must be in the lap,
the lordly iron. The dragon must be in the barrow,
aged, proud in treasure. The fish must be in the water,
propagating its kind. The king must wait in the hall,
dealing in rings.

— Modern English Translation

Beowulf describes ring-giving as having a central role in building social cohesion among the retainers of a lord, who is in turn referred to by the kenning "ring-giver". Thanes are given treasures such as rings, and after accepting them enter into an agreement to remain loyal in return; in this practice, the significance for building relations is in the cultural value of the exchange rather than the objective value of the ring, or other treasure, itself. Hrōðgār upholds his responsibility as a king with both deeds and actions, sharing rings during feasts in Heorot. This stands in contrast with Heremod, who did not give rings to retainers while king of the Danes and is given as an example of an unjust and greedy king who was eventually removed from his position for abusing his authority.

The importance of rings as royal cult objects continued after Christianisation of the Anglo-Saxons into the 10th century CE, as attested in the Anglo-Saxon chronicle when an English king is referred to as a generous ring-giver (Old English: beaggifa), a description also used for Jesus in the Old Saxon Heliand. (Note: Here the term used is Old Saxon: bâggeƀon.) The relationship with kings is also seen in the Swedish Svíagriss – an ancestral ring of the Ynglings whose name means "Sweden-piglet". The association between pigs and the Ynglings is also seen in the use of boar helmets and through their claimed descent from Frey, a god closely associated with the animal. Together, this has led to the proposal that the ring represents the totemic connection between the Swedes and boar.

=== Oaths ===
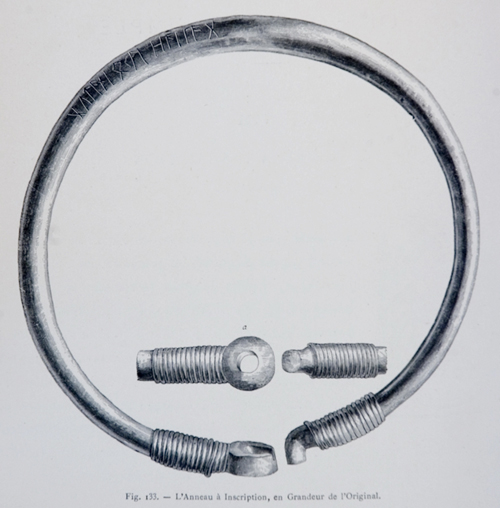
The ring of Pietroassa (drawing by Henri Trenk, 1875).

Related to the concept of swearing allegiance to a ruler in return for a ring, oaths were also sworn upon rings without an exchange of ownership. In Hávamál, Odin describes how he broke a ring-oath (Old Norse: baugeið), and now cannot be trusted. The Anglo-Saxon chronicle records that in 876, the Danes were convinced to swear a peace oath on a holy ring (Old English: hâlgan beage) to King Alfred after his victory at Wareham. Sagas such as Eyrbyggja saga and Víga-Glúms saga describe rings sitting on the altars of North Germanic heathen temples, upon which oaths would be sworn. During blóts, the ring could then be sprinkled with blood from a sacrificed animal. Temple rings varied in size in accounts, from small rings weighing around 50 g, as in Landnámabók, to that described in Eyrbyggja saga at a temple of Thor weighing around 550 g.

In Atlakviða, Atli swears an oath on a ring dedicated to Ullr, while in Landnámabók oaths are sworn on a ring, while calling on the names of Freyr, Njörðr and an unclear god referred to as the 'almighty Ás':

Baugr, tvíeyringr eða meiri, skyldi liggja í hverju höfuðhofi á stalla. Þann baug skyldi hverr goði hafa á hendi sér til lögþinga allra, þeira er hann skyldi sjálfr heyja, ok rjóða hann þar áðr í roðru nautsblóðs þess, er hann blótaði þar sjálfr. Hverr sá maðr, er þar þurfti lögskil af hendi at leysa at dómi, skyldi áðr eið vinna at þeim baugi ok nefna sér vátta tvá eða fleiri. "Nefni ek í þat vætti," skyldi hann segja, "at ek vinn eið at baugi, lögeið. Hjálpi mér svá Freyr ok Njörðr ok inn Almáttki áss sem ek mun svá sök þessa sækja eða verja eða vitni bera eða kviðu eða dæma sem ek veit réttast ok sannast ok helzt at lögum ok öll lögmæt skil af hendi leysa, þau er undir mik koma, meðan ek em á þessu þingi.

— Old Norse text
Translation:

A ring weighing two ounces or more should lie on the stall in every chief Temple, and this ring should every chief or goði have upon his arm at all public law-motes (logthing) at which he should be at the head of affairs, having first reddened it in the blood of a neat which he himself had sacrificed there. Every man who was there to transact any business, as by law provided by the Court, should first take an oath upon that ring and name for the purpose two or more witnesses and repeat the following words: — "I call to witness in evidence, he was to say, that I take oath upon the ring, a lawful one (lögeid) so help me Frey and Niord and the Almighty God, to this end that I shall in this case prosecute or defend or bear witness or give award or pronounce doom according to what I know to be most right and most true and most lawful, and that I will deal lawfully with all such matters in law as I have to deal with while I am at this Thing."

— Modern English Translation

Sacred rings are also attested in East Germanic cultures, such as with the ring of Pietroassa, the Elder Furthark inscription of which has been translated from Gothic as "inheritance of the Goths. I am holy". A letter from Bishop Ambrosius of Milan in the 4th century CE also describes arm rings being worn both by heathen Gothic priests and, to his displeasure, the Gothic Arian priests.

After the Christianisation of the Germanic peoples, the practice retained some importance during the medieval period, where rings were hung on church doors, such as the Forsa Ring from Hälsingland in Sweden that was at a church adjacent to an old thing mound. Outside of Scandinavia, continental sources describing oaths being sworn on church rings from the 9th to 14th centuries CE.

== Mythology and legend ==
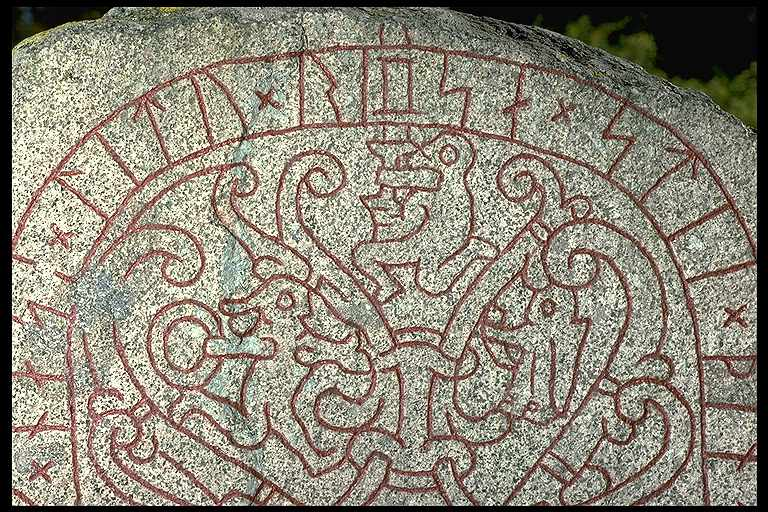
A detail from the early 11th c. Drävle runestone that has been interpreted as Andvaranaut to the left of the picture being held either by Andvari or Atli's messenger Vingi, on the top of the picture, Sigurð slaying Fáfnir, and to the right Sigrdrífa offering him a drinking horn.

In mythological contexts, rings typically reflect their historical roles and are typically important items of high quality craftsmanship, forged by dwarfs, such as Freyja's neck-ring, Brisingamen. The ring Draupnir is told in Skáldskaparmál to have been forged by the dwarfs Brokkr and Sindri, to drip eight equally heavy rings every eight nights. (Note: Medieval accounts describe rings forming every nine nights due to the inclusive counting system common at the time. It has been proposed that it should be thought of as one ring forming every night by typical modern counting.) Accordingly, Draupnir is used in kennings for gold in Skáldskaparmál. Draupnir is typically attributed to Odin however in Skáldskaparmál it is once described as being owned by Baldr, and is lain in Baldr's pyre by Odin according to Gylfaginning. Gesta Danorum also describes a ring owned by Baldr that also brought wealth, and may reflect a shared tradition.

Draupnir has been seen as the mythical counterpart to the temple ring and has been identified on Norwegian bracteates dating from the 5th–7th centuries CE, where it has been proposed to act as a symbol of Odin's power, and to have a role in legitimising the sacred right of kings to rule. Although the precise interpretation of depictions involving rings is not undisputed, their common presence alongside depictions of gods in migration period bracteates and amulets, demonstrates the importance of the symbol to the Germanic peoples.

Great wealth is also associated with Andvaranaut, a ring once owned by the dwarf Andvari and taken by Loki through coercion as weregild for his killing of Ótr. Due to Loki's greed and threats, Andvari places a curse on the ring, along with the rest of the hoard that Loki takes, that it will be the death of whosoever owns it. Throughout the Völsunga saga, curse is fulfilled with the owners of the ring dying, including Otr's father Hreiðmarr, his brother Fáfnir (who becomes a dragon after claiming it) and the hero Sigurð.

== See also ==
- List of named weapons, armour and treasures in Germanic heroic legend
- Magic ring

== Bibliography ==
=== Primary ===
- Crawford, Jackson (2017). The Saga of the Volsungs : with the Saga of Ragnar Lothbrok. Indianapolis: Hackett Publishing Company, Inc. ISBN 9781624666339.
- Orchard, Andy (2011). The Elder Edda : a book of Viking lore. London: Penguin Books. ISBN 9780141393728.
- Scott, Mariana (1966). The Heliand: Translated from the Old Saxon. Vol. 52. University of North Carolina Press. doi:10.5149/9781469658346_scott. ISBN 9781469658346. JSTOR 10.5149/9781469658346_scott.
- Sturluson, Snorri (2018). The Prose Edda. Translated by Brodeur, Arthur Gilchrist. Franklin Classics Trade Press. ISBN 9780344335013.
- Þorgilsson, Ari; Ellwood, Thomas (1898). The Book of the Settlement of Iceland: Tr. from the Original Icelandic of Ari the Learned. T. Wilson.
- "Heliand (Old Saxon)".
- "Landnámabók (Part 4)". heimskringla.com.
- "Maxims II (Old English)". sacred-texts.com.
- "Maxims II (Modern English)". oldenglishpoetry.camden.rutgers.edu.

=== Secondary ===
- Battaglia, Marco (2009). Studi anglo-norreni in onore di John S. McKinnell : he hafað sundorgecynd, In the Beginning Was the Ring:Mythological Echoes and Heroic Allusions in the Origin of the 'Nibelungen Hort' (1st ed.). Cagliari: CUEC. pp. 289–303. ISBN 9788884675279.
- Fee, Christopher (1996). ""Beag & Beaghroden": Women, treasure and the language of social structure in "Beowulf"". Neuphilologische Mitteilungen. 97 (3). Modern Language Society: 285–294. JSTOR 43346397.
- Jarman, Cat (2021). River kings : a new history of Vikings from Scandinavia to the Silk Roads. London: Harper Collins Publishers. ISBN 9780008353117.
- Kovárová, Lenka (2011). "The Swine in Old Nordic Religion and Worldview". Háskóla Íslands.
- Okasha, Elizabeth (2003). "Anglo-Saxon Inscribed Rings" (PDF). Leeds Studies in English: 29–45.
- Riisoy, Anne Irene (2016). "Performing Oaths in Eddic Poetry: Viking Age Fact or Medieval Fiction?". Journal of the North Atlantic. 8 (sp8): 141–156. doi:10.3721/037.002.sp811. ISSN 1935-1933. S2CID 164046653.
- Schichler, Robert Lawrence (1996). "Glæd man at Heorot: Beowulf and the Anglo-Saxon Psalter" (PDF). Leeds Studies in English. 27: 46–68.
- Sheehan, John (2001). Ireland's Viking-age hoards: sources and contacts. Vikingeskibsmuseet. pp. 51–59. ISBN 978-87-85180-42-1.
- Sheehan, John (2011). Bullion rings in Viking Age Britain and Ireland. University of Iceland Press. pp. 393–406. ISBN 978-9979-54-923-9.
- Simek, Rudolf (2008). A Dictionary of Northern Mythology. Translated by Hall, Angela. BOYE6. ISBN 9780859915137.
- "Important Viking hoard highlights the continuing success of the Treasure Act and Portable Antiquities Scheme". The Portable Antiquities Scheme (Press release). 14 December 2011. Archived from the original on 4 January 2012.
- Wessén, Elias; Jansson, Elias Sven B.F. (1953–1958). "Sveriges runinskrifter: IX. Upplands runinskrifter del 4" (PDF) (in Swedish). Stockholm: Kungl. Vitterhets Historie och Antikvitets Akademien. ISSN 0562-8016.
