= Brjáns saga =

Hypothetical early specimen of Old Norse literature

Brjáns saga (also Brjánssaga) is a hypothetical early specimen of Old Norse literature. According to the hypothesis, certain episodes in Njáls saga and Þorsteins saga Síðu-Hallssonar drew on this lost saga.

There is no external evidence of this saga's existence, though it was postulated by the Icelandic scholar Einar Ólafur Sveinsson, who edited Njál's saga in 1954. He believed it could have been written as early as the 1190s, and used by the author of Orkneyinga saga, who wrote in about 1200.

A controversial approach by the Irish academic Donnchadh Ó Corráin has attracted notice. He believed that the likely date of composition of the original Brjáns saga was around 1100, when Magnus Barelegs posed a threat to Irish interests (Clarke et al., 1998, p. 449). He believed that the hypothetical saga was written in Dublin in response to the Cogad Gáedel re Gallaib as the Hiberno-Norse Dubliners' way of saying that they were loyal to the descendants of Brian. He uses a reference to Brian in Þorsteins saga Síðu-Hallssonar as evidence for the saga's existence: "The earl thanked him for his words. After that they traveled to Ireland and fought with king Brian, and there many remarkable events happened at the same time as is said in his Saga."

== See also ==
- Brian Boru
