= Boar helmet =

Boar helmet may refer to:

- Germanic boar helmet
- Boar's tusk helmet
