= Boar helm =

Boar helm may refer to:

- Germanic boar helmet
- Boar's tusk helmet
