= Glúmr Geirason =

Icelandic poet

Glúmr Geirason (Old Norse: [ˈɡluːmz̠ ˈɡɛirɑˌson]; Modern Icelandic: Glúmur Geirason [ˈkluːmʏr ˈceiːraˌsɔːn]) was a 10th-century Icelandic skald. He composed poems about King Erik Bloodaxe and his son King Harald Greyhide.

According to Landnáma and Reykdœla saga Glúmr's father, Geiri, was a Norwegian who settled near Mývatn in the north of Iceland. After a feud with a local farmer, Geiri and Glúmr were forced to leave the area and resettled in Breiðafjörður. Glúmr's wife was Ingunn Þórólfsdóttir, their son Þórðr was the second husband of Guðrún Ósvífrsdóttir.

According to Skáldatal and Fagrskinna Glúmr composed a poem on Erik Bloodaxe where he laid out the king's exploits in many countries. No surviving verse can definitely be assigned to this poem but Finnur Jónsson attributed a two-line refrain found in the Third Grammatical Treatise to it. He also believed that a verse cited in Heimskringla and said to refer to Harald Greyhide was actually a part of the lay on Erik. This has been disputed.

Glúmr's major surviving work is the fragmentarily preserved Gráfeldardrápa, a memorial poem on Harald Greyhide composed shortly after his death (ca. 970). As arranged by Finnur Jónsson the preserved parts start with a half-stanza asking Haraldr's surviving brothers to listen to the poem. Then there are two and a half verse on Haraldr's battles around Scotland and in the east before and after he became king of Norway. This is followed by two verses on his expedition to Bjarmaland and his battles in general, as well as four verses on his last battle and death. One verse expresses the poet's regret for his deceased patron. Finally there is one half-verse which praises the physical prowess of the king and one which expresses the idea that the god Odin lived in the king. A refrain is also preserved.

Aside from the above poems one lausavísa by Glúmr is preserved, composed just after the Battle of Stord.

Finnur Jónsson described Glúmr's verses as very accomplished in form and somewhat old fashioned, surprisingly light and easy-flowing, having few but well-chosen and tasteful kennings. He considered Glúmr a competent poet with a certain originality.
