= Mathias Nordvig =

Danish researcher

Mathias Nordvig is a Danish Scandinavian studies scholar. He specialises in Old Norse literature and culture and has studied the impact of volcanoes in Icelandic literature. Holding a PhD title from Aarhus University, he is an assistant professor and head of Nordic Studies at the University of Colorado Boulder. Nordvig has been involved in modern paganism in Denmark and co-hosted the Nordic Mythology Podcast, which is about topics related to the Viking Age and Nordic mythology.

== Early life and education ==
Mathias Nordvig was born in Denmark and partially grew up in Greenland. With a mother practicing modern asatro—modern paganism of a Nordic variety—he was interested in the Viking Age and Norse mythology from childhood. He studied Scandinavian studies at Aarhus University.

== Academic career ==
Nordvig obtained a doctorate from Aarhus University in 2014 with a dissertation on Viking Age Iceland's relationship to volcanoes and their impact on mythology and literature. The dissertation was the basis for his monograph Volcanoes in Old Norse Mythology: Myth and Environment in Early Iceland, published in 2021 by ARC Humanities Press. Nordvig challenges a common view that the lack of unambiguous references to volcanoes in textual sources means that they left little trace in Viking Age and medieval Icelandic culture. He compares Icelandic culture to other cultures in close proximity to volcanoes and argues that because such cultures tend to personify volcanoes, several passages from Norse mythology recorded in Iceland are likely to be influenced by volcanic eruptions, without being explicitly presented as such. Nordvig argues that the story of Ragnarök in the poem Völuspá is particularly rich in descriptions that resemble volcanic activity, possibly influenced by the Eldgjá eruption of the 930s. Other passages include several verses in the Hallmundarkviða and the creation myth in the Prose Edda, where Nordvig interprets the imagery of fire and ice as attempts to describe phenomena for which Scandinavian settlers in Iceland had no prior vocabulary. Nordvig's thesis was criticised by Jens Peter Schjødt, professor of Nordic religion at Aarhus University, who says Viking Age Icelanders had no reason to hide references to natural phenomena between the lines of poems.

Nordvig's research has covered subjects such as witchcraft and magic in the Nordic region. He has compared Thorkil in the eighth book of the Gesta Danorum to Thor in the Prose Edda, arguing that their stories are derivative of the same myths. He taught in the Nordic Language and Literature division at Aarhus University before he was hired by the University of Colorado Boulder, where he is an assistant professor and head of Nordic Studies.

== Nordisk Tingsfællig ==
Nordvig has practiced modern paganism for most of his life. He was one of the co-founders of the Danish organisation Nordisk Tingsfællig (NTF), which began in 2010 as a small breakout group from Forn Siðr. The NTF was created after a dispute about Forn Siðr's acceptance of what the NTF founders regarded as "intolerant views", something they reject while seeking to be an apolitical but not naive group. Through Nordvig, the NTF criticised what it perceived as a weak spirituality in Forn Siðr, rejecting commonplace influences from Wicca such as standing in a circle during rituals. Nordvig became the main architect behind the group's ritual calendar, which allows for diverse practices and uses processions and evocations of Nordic gods to promote a connection to the physical landscape.

== Public engagement ==
In 2019, Nordvig and Daniel Farrand, owner of the company Horns of Odin, co-founded the Nordic Mythology Podcast, a podcast that aims to provide accurate information about topics related to the Viking Age and Nordic mythology. It participates in a wider community of people interested in Viking-related topics and has included interviews with scholars and coverage of popular culture. Subjects covered have included runic poetry, ghost stories, trolls from a historical perspective, tattoos and debates on social media. After stepping down from his role as co-host of the Nordic Mythology Podcast, but remaining a regular guest, Nordvig launched The Sacred Flame Podcast on 12 February 2023. This podcast is about the relationship between Nordic mythology and contemporary life.

Nordvig has written the books Ásatrú for Beginners: A Modern Heathen's Guide to the Ancient Northern Way (2020), which introduces his views on modern Nordic paganism, and Norse Mythology for Kids: Tales of Gods, Creatures, and Quests (2020). He actively seeks to dispel stereotypes and political appropriations of historical Scandinavian material, which exist in both right-wing and left-wing milieus.

== Selected publications ==
- Ásatrú for Beginners: A Modern Heathen's Guide to the Ancient Northern Way, 2020
- Norse Mythology for Kids: Tales of Gods, Creatures, and Quests, 2020
- Volcanoes in Old Norse Mythology: Myth and Environment in Early Iceland, 2021
