= Almáttki áss =

Norse God

Almáttki áss (the almighty áss "god") is an unknown Norse god evoked in an Icelandic legal oath sworn on a temple ring, mentioned in Landnámabók (Hauksbók 268).

== Attestations ==
The reference in Landnámabók is found in a section describing the old heathen laws for how one should swear legal oaths:

"Nefni ek í þat vætti," skyldi hann segja, "at ek vinn eið at baugi, lögeið. Hjálpi mér svá Freyr ok Njörðr ok inn almáttki Áss sem ek mun svá sök þessa sækja eða verja eða vitni bera eða kviðu eða dæma sem ek veit réttast ok sannast ok helzt at lögum ok öll lögmæt skil af hendi leysa, þau er undir mik koma, meðan ek em á þessu þingi.

—Old Norse text

"I call to witness in evidence, he was to say, that I take oath upon the ring, a lawful one (lögeid) so help me Frey and Niord and the Almighty God, to this end that I shall in this case prosecute or defend or bear witness or give award or pronounce doom according to what I know to be most right and most true and most lawful, and that I will deal lawfully with all such matters in law as I have to deal with while I am at this Thing."

—Modern English Translation

== Theories ==
The identity of this divinity has given rise to much speculation.

=== Thor ===
The identification with Thor is by far the most common. The adjective "almighty" applies particularly well to him (Note: "He is strongest of all the gods and men" according to Snorri Sturluson's Gylfaginning (21).) and he had a prominent position by the time of the settlement of Iceland.

=== Ullr ===
The almáttki áss can be identified with Ullr for in Atlakviða (30) Gudrún mentions the oaths Gunnar sworn by Ullr's ring. Rudolf Simek theorizes that this hypothesis was in contradiction with the insignificance of the cult of Ullr.

=== Odin ===
The expression could also refer to Odin, represented in much of the Old Norse corpus as the most important god of the Norse pantheon.

=== Týr ===
Rudolf Simek also suggested that the almáttki áss might be Týr. Even if this god was little known in Iceland, the oath was a legal one and Týr was historically linked to law (cf. Mars Thingsus).

=== Christianity ===
Finally, as the oath was transmitted by a Christian author, the almáttki áss could have a Christian meaning. John Lindow thus suggested that maybe the author "meant the 'almighty áss' to be a noble pagan anticipation of the new religion that was to come". Régis Boyer shares this opinion, underscoring that the word "almáttki" is nowhere else to be found in a pagan context.

== See also ==
- Regnator omnium deus (Latin 'god, ruler of all'), a deity mentioned by Tacitus in 1 CE as venerated by the Semnones

== Bibliography ==
=== Primary ===
- Þorgilsson, Ari (1898). The Book of the Settlement of Iceland: Tr. from the Original Icelandic of Ari the Learned. Translated by Ellwood, Thomas. Kendal: T. Wilson. OCLC 14111130.
- "Landnámabók (Part 4)". heimskringla.com.

=== Secondary ===
- Livre de la colonisation de l'Islande selon la version de Sturla Þórðarson (Sturlubók). Traduit de l'islandais ancien, annoté et commenté par Régis Boyer. Turnhout: Brepols, 2000. Miroir du Moyen Âge. ISBN 2-503-50997-5.
- Lindow, John. Norse Mythology: A Guide to the Gods, Heroes, Rituals, and Beliefs. New York: Oxford University Press, 2002. ISBN 0-19-515382-0.
- Simek, Rudolf. Dictionary of Northern Mythology. Translated by Angela Hall. Cambridge: D. S. Brewer, 1996. ISBN 0-85991-513-1.
