= Stjörnu-Odda draumr =

Icelandic tale

Stjörnu-Odda draumr (Star-Oddi's Dream) is a þáttr (short Old Norse-Icelandic tale) which recounts the dream-vision of Oddi Helgason, a twelfth-century Icelandic farmer and astronomer. It is considered to be "a literary tour de force and altogether unique in the saga corpus" because of its saga-within-a-dream narrative. The saga records that Oddi dreams that a guest arrives at his home and starts telling a legendary saga set in Götaland; during the course of the dream Oddi steps into this saga and becomes one of its characters:

Now as soon as this man Dagfinn was named in the saga, the story goes that something very strange happened in Oddi's dream. Oddi himself thought he was this man Dagfinn, whereas the guest – the man who was telling the saga – is now out of our saga and out of the dream; and then Oddi thought that he himself could see and perceive everything which came afterwards in the dream. So after this point the dream is to be told just as it seemed to appear to Oddi himself: he thought he was Dagfinn, and that he was getting ready for his journey with Geirvid the king.

The saga is preserved in the manuscript AM 555h 4to, copied by Árni Magnússson in 1686 from the now lost late fourteenth-century codex Vatnshyrna.

== Bibliography ==
=== Editions ===
- Vilmundarson, Þórhallur; Vilhjálmsson, Bjarni (1991). "Stjörnu-Odda draumr". Harðar Saga. Íslenzk fornrit. Vol. 13. Reykjavík: Hið Íslenzka Fornritafélag.
- Modern Icelandic Edition "Stjörnu-Odda draumur". www.snerpa.is.

=== Translations ===
- Taylor, Marvin (1997). "Star-Oddi's Dream". In Hreinsson, Viðar (ed.). The complete sagas of Icelanders : including 49 tales. Vol. 2. Reykjavík: Leifur Eiríksson Publ. pp. 448–459. ISBN 978-9979929352. OCLC 635253470.
- O'Connor, Ralph (2006). "Star-Oddi's Dream". Icelandic histories & romances. Stroud: Tempus Publ. pp. 93–113. ISBN 978-0-7524-2894-9. OCLC 250057069.
