= List of named weapons, armour and treasures in Germanic heroic legend =

| Object or horse | Names in medieval languages | Name meaning | Role/possessor | Notes |
|---|---|---|---|---|
| Andvaranaut | Old Norse: Andvaranautr | The name means "object formerly belonging to Andvari". | A cursed magic ring in the Norse Nibelung legends. | |
| Brinnig (Freise) | Middle High German: Brinnic, Freise | Compare "Brinnig" to MHG brennec ("burning"). Freise comes from MHG vreise, vreissam ("terrible"). | Hildebrand's sword. | |
| Brísingamen | Old Norse: Brísingamen, Old English: Brosinga mene | The name appears to mean "necklace of the Brisings", but the first element is probably related to Norwegian brisa ("to shine") or ON brisingr ("fire"). | In Beowulf, Háma is said to have stolen it from Ermanaric. It is given to Beowulf by Wealhtheow, and Beowulf gives it to queen Hygd. | |
| Dainsleif | Old Norse: Dáinsleif | The name means "Dáin's legacy". The name Dáinn itself means "the one who is dead". | The sword wielded by Högni in the never-ending Hjaðningavíg in the Poetic Edda. It was forged by the dwarves and every time is drawn it has to kill a man. When used it never fails and it wounds never heal. | |
| Eckesachs | Middle High German: Eckesahs, Old Norse: Eckisax | "Sword with a sharp edge", from PGmc *agjō- (sharp-edged) and MHG sahs ("long knife" or "short sword"). Later reinterpreted as "sword of the giant Ecke." | Taken by Dietrich von Bern from the giant Ecke. | In the Þidreks saga, the sword has a serpentine design and is said to look alive. |
| Finnsleif | Old Norse: Finnsleif | The name means "Finn's legacy", but who this eponymous Finn was is unknown. | In Skáldskaparmál, the mail shirt Finnsleif, helmet Hildigölt/Hildisvini and the ring Svíagriss had been in possession of Aðils' (Eadgils) dynasty the Ynglings for generations, but Hrólfr kraki's (Hroðulf) champions demanded them for their lord Hrólfr in return for having helped Aðils win the Battle on the Ice of Lake Vänern. The Swedish king refused. | |
| Gleste | Middle High German: Gleste | From MHG gleste "glow, glitter, gleam". | The sword of Eckehart. | Alpharts Tod |
| Gram/Balmung | Old Norse: Gramr, Middle High German: Balmunc | Gramr means "king" or "warrior" and is connected to the word grimmr meaning "ferocity", "sternness" or "wrath" (cf. folksgrimmr). Balmung is from MHG balme ("rock, rocky cave"), from Latin: palma, meaning "sword found in a cave." | Sigurd/Siegfried's sword. | In the Nibelungenlied, acquired from the giants Nibelung and Schiltung. In Norse tradition, the ancestral sword of the Völsungs. |
| Gullinhjalti | Old Norse: Gullinhjalti, Old English: Gyldenhilt | The name means "Golden-Hilt". | In Beowulf, the giant-sword with which the hero Beowulf slays Grendel's mother. In Hrólfs saga kraka, it is owned by Hrólfr kraki (Hróðulf), who gives it to Hött, who uses it to "kill" the troll that terrorizes the Danes. Bödvar Bjarki had already killed it, but left it to look alive so that Hött could "slay" it. King Hrólfr understands the ruse but keeps the secret, and names Hött Hjalti after the sword. | |
| Helm of Awe | Old Norse: Ægishjálmr, Old Norse: Œgishjálmr | The name means "frightening helmet". | It was Sigurd's helmet (in Gylfaginning 38, Fafnismál 16, 17, 44, and prose, and Reginsmál 14 and prose) that he took from the head of the dragon Fafnir after killing him. According to Snorri, it had previously belonged to Fafnir's father Hreiðmarr. | It could be an influence from the Greek aigis, which also struck fear into everyone who saw it. In Zeus' case it was a shield, and in Athena's a cloak with a gorgon head. The Greek word aigis could thus have become the "helm of awe" through folk etymology because of the similarity with ON œgr which means "terrible". It has nothing to do with the Norse sea giant Ægir. |
| Hildegrim | Middle High German: Hildegrîn, Old Norse: Hildegrímur | Based on *hildi- ("battle") and *grīma ("mask, helmet, hood"). | Dietrich von Bern's shining helmet. | In the Þidreks saga, it was taken by Dietrich from the giants Hilldur and Grímur. In the Eckenlied, it is replaced with Ecke's armor, called "the new Hildegrim". |
| Hildisvíni | Old Norse: Hildisvíni or Hildigǫlt | The name of the helmet Hildisvíni means "battle-swine", and Hildigǫlt means "battle boar". The Swedes wore helmets decorated with boars. Moreover, the Swedish Yngling dynasty were called descendants of the god Freyr whose animal was the boar. The boar was likely their regal insignia. | In the saga tradition, the Swedish king Eadgils (Aðils) had three main treasures: Hildisvíni ("battle swine"), Svíagríss ("boar of the Swedes") and Finnzleif ("Finn's inheritance"). It had first belonged to the Swedish king Onela (Áli), but it was later owned by Eadgils, his nephew and opponent in the dynastic struggle. Bjarkarímur tells that Bjarki (Beowulf's cognate) took the helmet from Onela, as spoil of war, at the Battle on the Ice (mentioned in Beowulf, lines 2391–96). However, Aðals (Eadgils) declared that the king chooses first and took the helmet, which offended Bjarki who had to accept the king's decision. | The name of this helmet "battle swine" recalls the boar helmets mentioned in Beowulf, in the lines 303, 1112, and 1328. |
| Hoard of the Nibelungs | Old Norse: hodd or arfi Niflunga, Middle High German: hort der Nibelunge | | The treasure acquired by Siegfried/Sigurd, taken by the Burgundians, desired by Attila/Kriemhild, and finally sunk in the Rhine. | In the Nibelungenlied, the hoard is inexhaustible (the gold will never run out) and includes a magic wand that grands world domination and a cloak of invisibility (only the latter of which plays a role in the poem). |
| Høking | Old Norse: Hœking | The name is a kenning for "sword". It probably originates in Bjarkamál, the lay of Bödvar Bjarki, where it means the "sword that Hoc owned", and originates in an older lay on the battles in the generation of Healfdene. | The sword Ingeld's son Agnar wielded when he fought Bödvar Bjarki. Bjarki comments that Agnar struck the dented sword over his head and might have hurt him worse if it had been sharper. | It is mentioned in Saxo's Latin translation of Bjarkamál in Gesta Danorum. |
| Hornbile | Middle High German: Hornbîle | The name probably means "sword with a horn grip", the second element bîle means "axe, cutting edge". | One of Biterolf's three swords. | |
| Hrotti | Old Norse: Hrotti | In modern Icelandic it means "long man" and the Old Danish form runte meant "jumping pole". Cf. Hrunting, Beowulf's sword. | When Sigurd had killed the dragon Fafnir and won the treasure, he took a golden byrnie, the Helm of awe, and the sword Hrotti. | Prose Edda |
| Hrunting | Old English: Hrunting | The first element hrunt may mean "long piece of wood", and is related to OE hrinda(n) ("to thrust"), cf. Hrotti. | Unferth's sword that he gives to Beowulf. It is supposed to be invincible but it fails him when he fights Grendel's mother. | Beowulf |
| Laufi, Snirtir | Old Norse: Laufi or Snirtir | The name Laufi, meaning "thin as a leaf", is used in all sources except for Gesta Danorum, where it is called Snirtir, from snerta meaning "to attack". The name is used in later Scaldic works, such Hattalykill and the Þulur of the Edda in the sense "sword". | Bödvar Bjarki's sword with which he killed Ingeld's son Agnar. It is called "German" sword by Saxo because of a mistranslation of ON saxsverð that meant "short sword". It had similar properties to the sword Tyrfing of Hervarar saga and to Dainsleif of the Prose Edda: It could not be unsheathed without causing the death of a man, and it could only be drawn three times by the same owner. Moreover, it should not be rested on its hilt, nor put under a man's head. | It is mentioned in Saxo's Latin translation of Bjarkamál in Gesta Danorum. |
| Limme | Middle High German: Limme | The etymology is uncertain; possibly from MHG limmen ("to growl, to grind the teeth") or PGmc *leuhma- ("to shine, to flash"). | Widige's helmet. | According to Biterolf und Dietleib, the helmet has been made by Wayland. |
| Mal | Middle High German: Mâl | Probably from MHG mâl ("decoration, ornament"), commonly used of ornaments on weapons. | Wolfhart's sword in Rosengarten zu Worms F. | |
| Mimming | Old English: Mimming, Middle High German: Mimminc, Old Norse: Mimungr | Possibly from PGmc *min- ("to remember"). The short vowel makes an association with Mimir unlikely. | Witige's sword, made by Wayland. | In the Waldere, the sword, a gift from Dietrich von Bern to Witige, has come into the hands of Walter of Aquitaine. |
| Nagelring | Middle High German: Nagelrinc, Old Norse: Naglringr | First element OHG nagal, OE nægl, ON nagl ("nail"), a common Germanic name for swords. Possibly means "sword with a ring attached to it." | Háma's (Heime's) sword. | In the Þidreks saga, made by the dwarf Alberich. |
| Nægling | Old English: Nægling | See Nagelring, above. | Beowulf's sword. | The sword breaks while Beowulf fights the dragon at the end of the epic. |
| Refil | Old Norse: Refill | Perhaps meaning "grater" or "strip". | A sword belonging to Regin in Skáldskaparmál. | He owns it just before Fafnir turns into a dragon, and flees with it. |
| Rose | Middle High German: Rôse | MHG rôse ("rose"), indicating "the most excellent." | The sword of Ortnit and Wolfdietrich. | The sword is given to him by Alberich. After Ortnit is killed by the dragon, the sword is found by Wolfdietrich, who kills the dragon with it. |
| Ridil | Old Norse: Riðill | In modern Norwegian (ridel) and Icelandic (riðill) the name means "piece of wood for tying up nets". | The sword Sigurd used to cut out the dragon Fafnir's heart. | Poetic Edda |
| Schrit | Middle High German: Schrit | May be based on OHG scrîtan ("to go", "to stride"). | One of Biterolf's swords. | The sword is forged by the smith Mime (Mimir). |
| Skofnung | Old Norse: Skǫfnungr | Skǫfnungr was a type of weapon, e.g. skǫfnungs-ǫx (an axe). The name is a later form of the word skǫflungr which meant "the skin". | A sword belonging to Hrólfr kraki (Hróðulf) in Hrólfs saga kraka, in which is "bound the souls of twelve berserkers", and its sharpness is unnatural. When Hrólfr and his men flee over the Fýrisvellir with the Swedish king Aðils' (Eadgils) gold, he spreads the gold behind him to occupy the pursuers. Aðils, however, does not stop for gold, and it is only when Hrólfr drops Aðils' treasured ring Svíagriss that the Swedish king tries to pick it up. Hrólfr then cuts off the stooping Swedish king's buttocks with Skofnung. During Hrólf's last battle, it is told that it made a singing sound when it hit bone. After his death, it was buried with him in his mound. | According to Landnámabók, an Icelander named Skeggi pillaged Hrólfr kraki's barrow and there he found Hrólf's sword Skofnungr, Hjalti's axe and Bödvar Bjarki's sword Laufi. Bödvar's corpse rose to fight Skeggi and take back the sword but Skeggi was defended by Hrólfr. Back in Iceland, Skeggi lent the sword to Kormákr Ögmundarson so he could use it in a duel. Later Skeggi's son lent it to his relative Þorkell Eyjólfsson of the Laxdæla saga, the husband of Guðrún Ósvífrsdóttir. Their son Gellir went to Rome on a pilgrimage, but c. 1073 died on his way home in Roskilde, next to Lejre where the sword was found, and was buried there. |
| Svíagriss | Old Norse: Svíagriss | A ring whose name means "Boar of the Swedes". It is most likely an authentic tradition, as the Swedes wore helmets decorated with boars. Moreover, the Swedish Yngling dynasty were called descendants of the god Freyr whose animal was the boar. The boar was likely their regal insignia and the rings had a sacral function. The boar also represented both Sweden and Freyr iconographically. | The Prose Edda and Hrolf kraki's saga relate when Hrólfr kraki had feasted at Eadgils' hall in Uppsala, he and his Danish retinue fled from the wrath of the Swedish king over the Fýrisvellir with a large horn full of treasure that he had been given by his mother Yrsa, the queen of Sweden. When the Swedes get too close, Hrólfr drops gold in his wake making Swedish warriors dismount to collect the gold. King Eadgils urges them to continue the pursuit, but then Hrólfr drops Svíagriss. Eadgils bends down on his horse to take the ring with his spear, but then Hrólfr calls out that he has made the most powerful man in Sweden bend like a pig and cuts Eadgils with his sword wounding him so much that he has to be taken back to his hall. Hrólfr takes the ring and escapes. | The Prose Edda relates that the ring had been passed down through generations, which would make it an old heirloom in the sixth century. Such "boar rings" have been found in Sweden from the fourth c., and most of them in Gotland and Uppland. |
| Tyrfing | Old Norse: Tyrfingr | "Visigoth" (Tervingi), possibly because of the fame of Toledo steel during the Visigothic rule, but transmitted through remaining Visigoths (Tervingi) further east (continental). | A cursed sword that shines like flames, going from the dwarves Durin and Dvalin, who cursed it, to Svafrlami to Arngrim, to Angantyr Arngrimsson, to Hervor, to Heidrek, to thralls, to Angantyr Heiðreksson. | As Svafrlami knew that Dvalinn and Durinn were the most skilled smiths among the dwarves, he commanded them to forge the best sword for him with hilt and grip of gold. It would never rust or fail and pierce iron like cloth, and always make its master victorious. The dwarves did as commanded and forged Tyrfing, but they cursed it so it would cause Svafrlami's death, do three evil deeds and be the death of a man every time it was drawn. |

== Sources ==
- Byock, Jesse (1990). The Saga of the Volsungs: The Norse Epic of Sigurd the Dragon Slayer. University of California Press. ISBN 0-520-23285-2.
- Byock, Jesse (1999). The Saga of King Hrolf Kraki. The Penguin Group. ISBN 014043593X.
- Snorri Sturluson, The Prose Edda. Translated by Byock, Jesse. The Penguin Group. 2005. ISBN 978-0-140-44755-2.
- Cleasby, Richard; Vigfússon, Gudbrand (1874). An Icelandic-English dictionary. Oxford Clarendon Press.
- Dutton, Douglas Robert (2015). An Encapsulation of Óðinn: Religious belief and ritual practice among the Viking Age elite with particular focus upon the practice of ritual hanging 500 -1050 AD (dissertation) (PDF). Centre for Scandinavian Studies The University of Aberdeen.
- Edda, Snorri Sturluson. Translated by Faulkes, Anthony. Everyman. 1995. ISBN 978-0460876162.
- Gillespie, George T. (1973). Catalogue of Persons Named in German Heroic Literature, 700-1600: Including Named Animals and Objects and Ethnic Names. Oxford: Oxford University. ISBN 978-0-19-815718-2.
- The Poetic Edda. Translated by Hollander, Lee M. Texas University Press. 1928.
- Klaeber, Friedrich (2008). Fulk, R.D.; Bjork, Robert E.; Niles, John D. (eds.). Klaeber's Beowulf and The Fight at Finnsburg. University of Toronto Press. pp. 274–277. ISBN 978-0-8020-9843-6.
- Krause, Arnulf (2010). Reclams Lexikon der germanischen Mythologie und Heldensage. Reclam. ISBN 978-3-15-010778-2.
- Olrik, Axel (1919). The Heroic Legends of Denmark. Translated by Hollander, Lee M. New York: The American-Scandinavian Foundation.
- Malone, Kemp (1930). "Ingeld". Modern Philology. 27 (3): 257–276. doi:10.1086/387833. S2CID 224833211.
- Müller, Jan-Dirk (2009). Das Nibelungenlied (3 ed.). Berlin: Erich Schmidt.
- Munch, Victor (1926). Norse Mythology, Legends of Gods and Heroes. New York: The American-Scandinavian Foundation.
- Nerman, Birger (1945). "Svíagríss - konung Adils' guldring" (PDF). Fornvännen.
- Newton, Sam (1993). The Origins of Beowulf and the Pre-Viking Kingdom of East Anglia. Cambridge University Press. ISBN 9780859914727.
- Olson, Oscar Ludvig (1916). "The Relation of the Hrólfs saga kraka and the Bjarkarímur to Beowulf". Publications of the Society for the Advancement of Scandinavian Study. 3 (1): 1–104. JSTOR 40914974.
- Osborn, Marijane; Mitchell, Stephen A. (2007). "The Battle on the Ice". ANQ: A Quarterly Journal of Short Articles, Notes and Reviews. 20 (3): 70–74. doi:10.3200/ANQQ.20.3.70-74. S2CID 162384098.
- Peterson, Lena (2007). Nordiskt runnamnslexikon. Uppsala: Institutet för språk och folkminnen.
- Price, Neil (2020). The Children of Ash and Elm: A History of the Vikings. Allen Lane. ISBN 9780241283981.
- Simek, Rudolf (1993). Dictionary of Northern Mythology. Translated by Hall; Angela. D. S. Brewer. ISBN 0-85991-369-4.
- Sundkvist, Anneli (2001). Hästarnas land, Aristokratisk hästhållning och ridkonst i Svealands yngre järnålder. Institutionen för Arkeologi och Antik Historia, Uppsala Universitet. ISBN 91-506-1471-1.
- The Saga of King Heidrek the Wise (PDF). Translated by Tolkien, Christopher. 1960.
- Pritsak, Omeljan (1981). The origin of Rus'. Harvard University Press. pp. 188–225.
- de Vries, Jan (1962). Altnordisches Etymologisches Worterbuch (2000 ed.). Brill. ISBN 90-04-05436-7.
