= Flóamanna saga =

Icelandic saga

Flóamanna saga ( 'the saga of the men of Flói'), also known as Þorgils saga Ørrabeinsstjúps ('the saga of Þorgils, foster-son of Ørrabeinn') is one of the sagas of Icelanders. The saga has been especially noted for the realistic depiction of the main character's journey to Greenland, which may reflect the author's own experience of such a journey, or an informant's.

== Summary ==
The saga extends across four generations, around the years 870-1020, focusing on the hero Þorgils. Chapters 1-9 and 18 are an account of Þorgils's ancestors based on Sturla Þórðarson's version of Landnámabók. However, the text also contains some motifs more common in the fornaldarsögur, not least because the text draws on Vǫlsunga saga to add to Þorgils's ancestors the legendary heroes Ragnarr Loðbrók, Sigurðr Fáfnisbani, and Óðinn. The narrative begins in Norway, recounting the deeds of Atli and his sons, including their disputes with Ingólfr Arnarson and his foster brother Hjǫrleifr Hróðmarsson. It then tells of Hallsteinn Atlason's migration to Iceland, the setting shifting to south-western Iceland in the Settlement Period.

In his prime, Þorgils is portrayed as a classic hero; one episode, for example, draws on the classic Grettis saga. Aged 16 he returns to his ancestral home of Norway to seek his patrimony there. He travels to the British Isles and gains both a precious sword and a Scottish bride. However, returning to Iceland, he gives this wife to his best friend and marries an Icelandic woman. He converts to Christianity, facing down the threats of the pagan god Þórr, who appears to him in dreams. He then travels to Greenland, aiming to settle there, but is shipwrecked. His companions are afflicted by disease and his wife is killed, and Þorgils must bring up his infant child. His time in Greenland is further curtailed by a fractious relationship with Eiríkr inn rauði. He returns to Iceland via Ireland and Hálogaland and settles down.

In the saga's last section, chapters 29-35, he becomes a stubborn and intractable character. He arguably represents a complex combination of traditional Scandinavian honour-culture with European, spiritually inspired Christian beliefs. In this, the saga may show influence from other sagas such as Eiríks saga rauða and Grænlendinga saga, along with saints' lives. Þorgils remarries and dies at the age of 85.

== Provenance and manuscripts ==
The saga is conventionally dated to around 1300; Richard Perkins argued specifically for a date certainly between 1290 and 1385, favouring a date between 1290 and 1330. He argued specifically that the saga could have been patronised or composed by Haukr Erlendsson.

The saga survives today in at least 67 manuscripts, which attest to two medieval versions of the saga: a longer one, known in scholarship as the M-version (primarily attested in AM 445 b, 4o, with some further material in AM 515, 4to), and a shorter one, known as the X-version, from which almost all the other manuscripts descend. One major X-manuscript was the now lost Vatnshyrna, whose text is preserved in a copy by the priest Ketill Jörundarson (Reykjavík, Stofnun Árna Magnússonar, AM 516 4o), and as annotations by Árni Magnússon to another manuscript, AM 515 4o. The longer M-text probably represents most closely the original form of the saga, but only survives fragmentarily.

== Editions and translations ==
- Bliksrud, Hilde A. (trans.), Sagaen om Floafolket (2014) (bokmål translation)
- Joleik, Albert (trans.), Soga um Torgjils Errabeinstjup eller Floamanna saga (nynorsk translation).
- Mendelssohn, Erich (trans.), Die Leute aus Floi. In: Grönländer und Färinger Geschichten. Jena: Eugen Diederichs Verlag, 1912 (Sammlung Thule - Altnordische Dichtung und Prosa. Thule, Band 13.) (German translation)
- Perkins, Richard (ed.), (1972). An edition of Flóamanna saga with a study of its sources and analogues. Dphil. University of Oxford.
- Þórhallur Vilmundarson and Bjarni Vilhjálmsson (eds), Harðar saga, Íslenzk fornrit, 13 (Reykjavík: Hið Íslenzka Fornritfélag, 1991)
