= Kumlbúa þáttr =

Medieval Icelandic tale

Kumlbúa þáttr (the tale of the cairn-dweller) is a short medieval Icelandic tale (þáttr) set at the end of the twelfth century or the beginning of the thirteenth. It tells the story of Þorsteinn Þorvarðsson who stumbles upon a burial cairn and takes a sword from it. After he returns home he goes to bed and is visited in a dream by the cairn-dweller. The man, who wields a huge pole-axe, demands the return of the sword and threatens Þorsteinn. Þorsteinn's wife wakes him to ask why he is sleeping so poorly but he does not tell her and goes back to sleep at once. The cairn-dweller reappears and declaims a threatening verse. However, Þorsteinn retorts with a more technically proficient verse which 'caps' that of the cairn-dweller who then leaves Þorsteinn. The following day Þorsteinn goes to look for the cairn but cannot find it. He returns home and tells his wife and other people the story.

The text survives in fragmentary form in AM 564a 4to (Pseudo-Vatnshyrna) and in paper copies made by Árni Magnússon of the Vatnshyrna manuscript, which was destroyed in the Copenhagen Fire of 1728. Like Bergbúa þáttr, it is unusual amongst þættir for not being preserved as part of the kings' sagas manuscripts Flateyjarbók and Morkinskinna.

== Critical reception ==
Stephen Mitchell considers Kumlbúa þáttr to be "a story that achieves neither a satisfying nor harmonious conclusion" and one that communicates a message that "there are forces at loose in the world which cannot be countered, whose source of power is unclear, and whose design we do not understand."

== Bibliography ==
=== Editions ===
- Guðni Jónsson (ed.). Kumlbúa þáttr. Íslendinga sögur. Vol. IV: Breiðfirðinga sögur. Digitised at heimskringla.no
- Þórhallur Vilmundarson; Bjarni Vilhjálmsson, eds. (1991). Harðar saga. Íslenzk fornrit. Vol. 13. Reykjavík: Hið íslenzka fornritafélag. pp. 451–455.
- Modern Icelandic edition at snerpa.is

=== Translations ===
- Taylor, Marvin (1997). "The tale of the cairn-dweller". In Viðar Hreinsson (ed.). Complete sagas of Icelanders, including 49 tales. Vol. 2. Reykjavik: Leifur Eiriksson. pp. 443–444. ISBN 9789979929321.
- Waggoner, Ben. "Kumlbúa þáttr: The tale of the cairn-dweller" (PDF). thetroth.org. Archived from the original (PDF) on 2015-06-20.
