= Reykdæla saga ok Víga-Skútu =

Icelandic saga

Reykdœla saga ok Víga-Skútu (Old Norse pronunciation: [ˈræykˌdøːlɑ ˈsɑɣɑ ɔk ˈwiːɣa ˌskuːtu]; Modern Icelandic: Reykdæla saga og Víga-Skútu,) is one of the sagas of Icelanders. The story takes place in the valley of Reykjadalur in northern Iceland in the second half of the 9th century. The saga consists of two parts. The first part principally features Áskell, father of Víga-Skúta; the second part is about Víga-Skúta and his quarrels with his father-in-law Glúmr Eyjólfsson (Víga-Glúmr) after Víga-Skúta marries his daughter and then deserts her.

This saga is the center of debate in relation to the oral origins of the sagas of Icelanders. This is due to its significant use of language that refers to the traditional transmission of this text. Its only extant medieval text witness is the fragmentary late 14th- or early 15th-century Icelandic manuscript AM 561 4to.

== See also ==
- Víga-Glúms saga

== Related reading ==
- Jónas Kristjánsson (1997) Eddas and Sagas: Iceland's Medieval Literature (Reykjavik: Hið íslenska bókmenntafélag. Peter Foote, trans)
- Jesse Byock (1993) Feud in the Icelandic Saga (University of California Press) ISBN 978-0520082595
