= Þórðar saga hreðu =

Icelandic saga

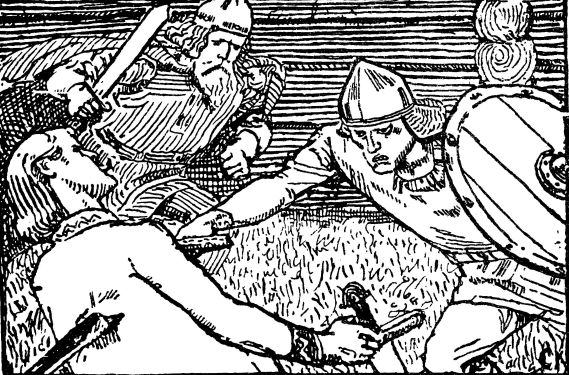
Killing of Sigurd Sleva Christian Krogh's drawing from "Heimskringla". 1899

Þórðar saga hreðu is one of the sagas of Icelanders. The saga dates from about 1350 and takes place at Miðfjörður in the northwest of Iceland in the latter half of the 900s.

The saga tells of Þórðr the Menace (hreða), a Norwegian who is obliged to flee to Iceland with his family after being implicated in the murder of the king's brother. In his new home, Þórðr makes an enemy of the local chieftain, but escapes death several times thanks to his friendship with the chieftain's son.

== Plot Synopsis ==
After his brother Klyppr kills Sigurðr slefa Eiríksson (a brother of Haraldr gráfeldr, King of Norway), the Norwegian hersir Þórðr Þórðarson is forced to flee Norway together with his sister Sigríðr and his other two brothers. The party settles in the Miðfjörður district of Iceland, but Þórðr refuses to defer to the local chieftain, Skeggi Skinna-Bjarnarson (who is also the owner of the famous sword Skofnung), and a simmering tension develops between the two men.

Events take an unexpected turn when Þórðr saves Skeggi's son Eiðr from drowning, and Eiðr subsequently insists on being fostered by Þórðr. Skeggi’s nephew Ásbjǫrn Þorsteinsson then falls in love with Sigríðr, but his chances of winning her hand are apparently dashed when he and Þórðr get into a brawl during a ball-game. Ásbjǫrn, frustrated, goes abroad. While he is away, Þórðr gets into another fight, this time at a Borgarfjörður market. At Eiðr's urging Skeggi intervenes to save Þórðr's life, and in return he asks that Þórðr consent to marry Sigríðr off to Ásbjǫrn. A grateful Þórðr agrees, though only on condition that Ásbjǫrn return to Iceland within three years. Skeggi accepts, and gives Þórðr the nickname hreða ('Menace').

Ásbjǫrn’s brother Ormr then falls in love with Sigríðr as well and asks Þórðr for her hand. Þórðr is unwilling to break his word to Skeggi by agreeing, and advises Ormr to wait until the agreed period of three years has elapsed. Ormr is unwilling to do so and attempts to seduce Sigríðr, prompting Þórðr to kill him. A vengeful Skeggi leads his men to Þórðr’s farm and the two sides square up for a battle, but Skeggi calls off the attack when Eiðr lines up alongside Þórðr.

At Eiðr’s urging Þórðr decides to leave the district for a while, and he lies low at the home of the cowardly old miser Þórhallr and his young wife Ólof Hrólleifsdóttir. Unfortunately for Þórðr, their farm is located close to that of Ǫzurr Arngrímsson, another powerful chieftain and cousin of Ormr. When Ǫzurr learns that his cousin's killer is staying in the vicinity he resolves to catch and kill him. He makes three attempts to kill Þórðr, but none are successful and the third results in his death. The slaying of Ǫzurr galvanises Skeggi into action, and he and his men secretly ride to Þórhallr’s farm and surround it. The cowardly Þórhallr refuses to protect Þórðr, who agrees to surrender to Skeggi provided he is killed at Ǫzurr’s barrow. Just as Skeggi is about to execute Þórðr, Eiðr arrives with Þórðr's brothers - having been tipped off by Ólof - and forces his father to release Þórðr. As Skofnung cannot be sheathed unless it has taken a life, Skeggi vents his anger by using it to kill Þórhallr.

Ásbjǫrn returns to Iceland, and he and Skeggi attack Þórðr on two separate occasions, but both engagements end with the two sides being parted by Eiðr. After the second skirmish, Þórðr, Skeggi and Ásbjǫrn all agree to let Eiðr arbitrate a settlement, and Ásbjǫrn subsequently marries Sigríðr, and a little after that Þórðr marries Ólof. Sǫrli inn sterki, an uncle of Ormr’s, comes to Iceland and challenges Þórðr to single combat; Þórðr kills Sǫrli but is badly wounded. Nevertheless he survives into old age and dies in his bed.

== Other sources ==
- Hagland, Jan Ragnar (2004) Soga om Tord den hardbalne (Stavanger : Erling Skjalgssonselskape) ISBN 8291640211
