= Oddi Helgason =

Icelandic astronomer

Oddi Helgason (c.1070/80 – c. 1140/50), called Star Oddi (Icelandic: Stjörnu-Oddi, Old Norse: Stjǫrnu-Oddi), worked as a farm laborer in the 12th century in northern Iceland and achieved remarkable astronomical knowledge through careful observations. Oddi resumed his work in the Oddatala where he stated the position of the sun for every day of the year in Iceland and calculated the date of summer and winter solstices and their direction giving a useful source of orientation for sailors, since no navigational instruments were used at that time. Oddi features as the protagonist in the fourteenth century Old Norse-Icelandic tale Stjǫrnu-Odda draumr.

== The Oddatala ==
The Oddatala (Icelandic for: Oddi's tale) is the only known written work of Star Oddi. In print, the text is only a couple of pages long divided into three chapters. The first chapter presents the exact date and time of summer and winter solstices with relation to the leap years. In the second chapter, Oddi specifies the sun's position over the year. In the last chapter, the direction of dawn and nightfall through the year is described.

== Historical Circumstances ==
In the eleventh and twelfth century the Julian calendar was introduced; it had to be adjusted to local parameters. Star Oddi's observations made a significant contribution to correctly adapting the Christian calendar. After Oddi's time the role of local, first hand scientific observations lost more and more importance due to growing literacy and acquirement of knowledge from books.
