= Víga-Glúms saga =

13th century Icelandic saga

Víga-Glúms saga (Modern Icelandic pronunciation:) is one of the Sagas of Icelanders. It takes place mostly in and around Eyjafjörður in North Iceland, and recounts the life and fall of Glúmr Eyjólfsson, a powerful man whose nickname, Víga, refers to his propensity for killing people. It is believed to have been written in the first half of the 13th century and one passage may allude to a political scandal of that time.

== Plot ==
Glúm's grandfather, Ingjald, was a son of Helgi inn magri (the Lean), the settler of Eyjafjörður, and farmer at Þverá (later the site of Munkaþverá monastery). Glúmr is the youngest son of his son Eyjólfr, and initially unpromising. After Eyjólfr's death, his second son also dies and soon after that his infant grandson, and the son's wife inherits half the farm; her father, Þorkell enn hávi (the Tall), and his son Sigmundr take the half where the house is and start to encroach on the half where Glúmr and his widowed mother Astrid live. Glúmr goes to Norway to visit his maternal grandfather, the chieftain Vigfúss, who warms to him after he defeats a marauding berserker, and presents him with three family heirlooms, a black cloak, a gold-inlaid spear and a sword, saying that he will prosper as long as he keeps them. Meanwhile, Sigmundr has been pressuring Astrid to leave her land, the boundary fence has been moved, and Þorkell and Sigmund have accused two reliable farmhands of Astrid's of slaughtering two of their cattle, and in settlement of a court case about this, deprived her of her right to farm a famously ever-fertile field, Vitazgjafi, which the two halves of the family had been working in alternate years. (The two carcasses are later found trapped under a snowdrift.) When Glúmr returns, he speaks the first of several skaldic verses about the injustice, beats cattle belonging to Þorkell and Sigmund that are loose on his and his mother's land, and laughs uncontrollably, which we are told he was in the habit of doing when the killing mood came on him. He then goes out to Vitazgjafi when Sigmund is mowing hay there, has Sigmund's wife sew him a replacement fastening for his cloak, then kills Sigmund with the spear.

That winter, Glúmr sees in a dream Vigfúss' personal spirit, (Note: The word hamingja is here used for what is usually called a fylgja - Viga-Glums Saga: With the Tales of Ögmund Bash and Thorvald Chatterbox, tr. John McKinnell, The New Saga Library / UNESCO Collection of Representative Works, Icelandic Series, Edinburgh: Canongate/UNESCO, 1987, ISBN 9780862410841, p. 69, note 1.) a giant woman, walking towards Þverá; she is so large that her shoulders brush the mountains on each side of the valley. Þórarinn of Espihóll, another powerful chieftain in the area, is both Sigmund's father-in-law and another descendant of Helgi the Lean; he reluctantly brings a case against Glúmr at the next Althing, but Glúmr's arguments and supporters prevail and Þorkell is forced to sell his half of the farm to Glúmr for less than half its value and to leave after six months. Before he goes he offers an ox to Freyr at his temple nearby, which the god accepts.

For forty years Glúmr is a powerful man in the district. He marries Halldora and has two sons and a daughter. He arranges the marriages between his cousin Arnórr and Þórgrímr Þórrisson and daughters of the chieftain Gizurr the White. (They were rivals for the same woman; their sons grow up as friends but later become enemies and one kills the other. An itinerant wise woman predicts their enmity.) He punishes his foreman, Ingólfr, for neglect of his duties by framing him for a murder, then clears his name by confessing to it himself, and arranges Ingólfr's marriage to the woman he wanted. However, after Víga-Skúta marries his daughter and then deserts her, Glúmr and he are each able to evade the other by trickery but Glúmr does not achieve revenge; and Glúmr's son Vigfúss' quarrel with Bárðr, which ends with Bárðr being killed by two Norwegian associates of Vigfúss', leads to an irreparable breach between Glúmr and the people of Espihóll. Vigfúss is sentenced to the lesser outlawry, but refuses to leave Iceland within the time specified, and his father shelters him; because the location is sacred to him, this is also an offence against Freyr.

In a battle between Glúmr and his allies (including the fugitive Vigfúss, whom his father hails by another name to conceal his presence) and the men of Espihóll and their allies touched off by Þórgrímr's son killing Arnórr's son, Glúmr himself kills Þórarinn's brother Þorvaldr krókr (Hook); however, he persuades Guðbrandr, the twelve-year-old son of Þorvarðr Ǫrnólfsson, who has stirred up matters between the two families, to claim the death. This is the killing that the other side then decide to prosecute; Glúmr succeeds in evading conviction at the regional assembly and at the Althing the case is settled providing he swears an oath in three temples in Eyjafjörður that he did not do it. Glúmr swears an ambiguous oath on the temple ring, first in the local temple of Freyr. (Note: The Old Norse "at ek vark at þar, ok vák at þar, ok rauðk at þar odd ok egg" means "that I was at that place, and I struck at that place, and at that place I reddened point and edge" but sounds identical to a poetic usage, "at ek varkat þar, ok vákat þar, ok rauðkat þar odd ok egg", which means "that I was not there, and did not strike there, and there I did not redden point and edge" - McKinnell, pp. 119–20 and note 3.)

Glúmr has now given away the cloak and spear given to him by his grandfather Vigfúss, and in a dream he sees his dead kin seeking to intercede for him with Freyr, who however remembers Þorkell's ox and is implacable. He is again prosecuted for the killing of Þorvaldr, and under the settlement reached, is required to give half the Þverá farm to Þorvaldr's son in compensation and to sell the other half and leave once the winter is over. He fails in his attempts to trick the new owner's men, and is finally forced to leave after the new owner's mother informs him that she has carried fire around the land, which constitutes formally claiming it. He farms at Möðruvellir in Hörgárdalur, then in Myrkárdalur, where a landslide destroys part of the farm buildings, and finally at Þverbrekka in Öxnadalur. He is humiliated and thwarted in his attempts to act in a dispute which starts over where a whale carcass should be taken for butchering, and becomes blind in his old age. Three years before his death, he is baptised a Christian. His son Már builds a church at Fornhagi in Hörgárdalur, where he and Glúmr are both buried.

== Manuscripts and dating ==
Víga-Glúms saga is preserved complete only in the mid-14th-century Möðruvallabók and in paper copies deriving from it, most of which are from the 17th and 18th centuries. Two other manuscripts each contain a fragment of the saga: AM 564a (late 14th century) and AM 445c (early 15th century), both parts of the Pseudo-Vatnshyrna. The fragments appear to represent an older, more detailed version of the saga. In the view of Gabriel Turville-Petre, the saga was probably originally written at about the same time as Egils saga, between 1230 and 1240, and the abbreviated version which has survived intact was probably not the work of the Möðruvallabók copyist himself and can be dated to the first half of the 14th century. However, if as has been suggested the Ingólfr episode is an allusion to a 13th-century event, since it draws on other parts of the saga the most likely date would be soon after 1232.

Two sections of the saga appear to be interpolations. The episode featuring Víga-Skúta is also found in a different version in his own saga, Reykdæla saga ok Víga-Skútu; in both sagas it differs stylistically from the rest of the text, so it is likely a þáttr that has been incorporated into them. It is also the only place in this saga where Glúmr is called 'Víga-Glúmr'. The Ingólfr episode which precedes it, with Ingólfr being compelled to test friendship by claiming to have committed murder when in fact he has only killed an animal for whom the person is named (Kálfr: a calf), is reminiscent of a parable found in the early-12th-century Disciplina Clericalis by Petrus Alphonsi; it has also been suggested that it modified this story to allude to an early-13th-century event, the killing of a man called Hafr (which means goat) and the suspicion that it was committed by Sighvatr Sturluson. One of the fragments of the longer version of the saga also contains the story of Ǫgmundr dytt (Bash), which is also told in a different form in the Great Saga of Ólafr Tryggvason; presumably this was also originally an independent þáttr.

== Themes and reception ==
Víga-Glúms saga has been relatively unpopular amongst the Sagas of Icelanders, partly because of Glúmr's unlikeability, partly because it and the other Eyjafjörður sagas are poorly preserved.

Scholars have drawn on the saga for information on hereditary luck; in Fortælling og ære (1993), Preben Meulengracht Sørensen used it as a major example in his examination of honour in the sagas.

In his 1940 edition, Turville-Petre pointed to an implied conflict between the cults of Freyr, with whom Glúmr's family had traditionally been associated in Iceland, and of Óðinn, with whom the spear and cloak given to him by his grandfather Vigfúss can be associated. He suggests that Glúmr can best be seen as an adherent of the philosophy of the Eddic poem "Hávamál", which he characterises as "[more] a mystical atheism than a faith"; for the saga author, Óðinn was not a personal force, while fate and luck were. In his 1964 book on Scandinavian paganism he related the "Hávamál" philosophy to the conversion-era phenomenon of "godless men", who trusted more in luck and their own strength than in the gods. In Nordic Religions in the Viking Age (1999), Thomas DuBois also saw Glúmr as essentially a "godless man", but argued that the sagas are "not simply a Christian colouring of pagan history" but thoroughly Christian narratives which cannot be used to reconstruct Scandinavian paganism; Víga-Glúms saga is one of his three case studies.

== Editions ==
- Þorgeir Guðmundsson and Þorsteinn Helgason, ed. Ljósvetnínga saga, Svarfdæla saga, Valla-Ljóts saga, Vemundar saga ok Vigaskútu, Vígaglúms saga. Íslendinga Sögur 2. Copenhagen: Hið konunglega norræna fornfræðafélag, 1830. OCLC 3004458.
- Guðmundur Þorláksson, ed. Glúma og Ljósvetninga saga. Íslenzkar Fornsögur 1. Copenhagen: Hið íslenzka bókmenntafélag, 1880. OCLC 499617762.
- Valdimar Ásmundarson, ed. Víga-Glúms saga. Íslendinga sögur 19. Reykjavík: Sigurður Kristjánsson, 1897. OCLC 23564932.
- Guðbrandur Vigfússon and F. York Powell, ed. and trans. "Víga-Glúms Saga". in Origines Islandicae: A Collection of the More Important Sagas and Other Native Writings Relating to the Settlement and Early History of Iceland. Volume 2 Oxford: Oxford University / Clarendon, 1905. OCLC 634004219. pp. 431–66.
- Benedikt Sveinsson, ed. Víga-Glúms saga. Íslendinga sögur 19. Reykjavík: Sigurður Kristjánsson, 1924. OCLC 3676279.
- G. Turville-Petre. Viga-Glúms Saga. 1940. 2nd ed. Oxford: Oxford University / Clarendon, 1960, repr. 1967. ISBN 9780198111177.

== Translations ==
- Sir E. Head, tr. Viga Glum's Saga: The story of Viga-Glum. London, 1877. OCLC 561339246.
- Lee M. Hollander, tr. Víga-Glúm's Saga and the Story of Ögmund Dytt. The Library of Scandinavian Literature 14. The American-Scandinavian Foundation. New York: Twayne, 1972. OCLC 573080.
- Alan Boucher, tr. The Saga of Viga Glum. Iceland Review saga series. Reykjavík: Iceland Review, 1986. OCLC 18095095.
- John McKinnell, tr. Viga-Glums Saga: With the Tales of Ögmund Bash and Thorvald Chatterbox. The New Saga Library / UNESCO Collection of Representative Works, Icelandic Series. Edinburgh: Canongate/UNESCO, 1987. ISBN 9780862410841.
  - (revised version) "Killer-Glum's Saga". In: The Complete Sagas of Icelanders, Including 49 Tales. ed. Viðar Hreinsson, Robert Cook et al. 5 vols. Volume 2 Outlaws Warriors and Poets. Reykjavík: Leifur Eiriksson, 1997. ISBN 9979-9293-2-4. pp. 267–314.
- George Johnston, tr. The Schemers & Víga-Glúm: Bandamanna Saga & Víga-Glúms Saga. Erin, Ontario: The Porcupine's Quill, 1999. ISBN 9780889841895.
