= Bergbúa þáttr =

Medieval Icelandic tale

Bergbúa þáttr ('The Tale of the Mountain-Dweller') is a short medieval Icelandic tale (þáttr). It tells of Þórðr and his companion who get lost on their way to church one winter and take refuge in a cave. Once inside, after they have settled down for the evening, they hear noises from the back of the cave. Later they see two huge eyes and hear a voice which recites a poem of twelve stanzas, now known as Hallmundarkviða. The speaker of these verses refers to himself as a giant, and repeats the poem three time across the course of the night. The giant instructs the humans to remember the poem or suffer a forfeit. Þórðr memorises the poem but his companion does not and subsequently dies the following year.

Hallmundarkviða makes many references to volcanic activity, and it has been suggested that it may refer to a specific Icelandic volcanic eruption. Determining which depends on the date of the poem. Bergbúa þáttr was probably written some time in the thirteenth century, but Hallmundarkviða may be considerably older. Guðmundur Finnbogason suggested that it may refer to the 1262 eruption at Sólheimajökull. The name Hallmundarkviða is only attested from 1844 but it has been proposed that the poem refers to the tenth century eruption at Hallmundarhraun.

The text survives in fragmentary form in AM 564a 4to (Pseudo-Vatnshyrna) and in paper copies made by Árni Magnússon of the Vatnshyrna manuscript, which was destroyed in the Copenhagen Fire of 1728. It is unusual amongst þættir for not being preserved as part of the kings' sagas manuscripts Flateyjarbók and Morkinskinna. Kumlbúa þáttr, which is thematically similar to Bergbúa þáttr, was likewise recorded outside of the kings' sagas manuscripts in Vatnshyrna and Pseudo-Vatnshyrna.
