= Þorsteins saga Síðu-Hallssonar =

Icelandic saga

Þorsteins saga Síðu-Hallssonar is one of the sagas of Icelanders from the 13th century. The saga is only partially preserved and features a number of dreams and interpretations. Torstein Side-Hallsson (Þorstein Síðu-Hallssonar) has a series adventures in the Orkney Islands, Ireland, Norway and Iceland during the early 1000s. The story also tells of Torstein participating in the Battle of Clontarf in 1014.

== Plot ==
As the saga is only partially preserved in surviving manuscripts, the first part has been lost. The text resumes with the protagonist Þorsteinn Síðu-Hallsson going abroad, entrusting his goðorð (chieftaincy) to his friend Þórhaddr. Þorsteinn enters the service of Jarl Sigurðr of Orkney and fights at the Battle of Clontarf. Meanwhile in Iceland, Þórhaddr mistreats his son-in-law Haukr.

When Þorsteinn returns to Iceland, Haukr appeals to him for help, and Þorsteinn demands his goðorð back. Þórhaddr refuses, so Þorsteinn forcibly ejects him from the district. Þórhaddr retaliates by slandering Þorsteinn, but then has a series of disturbing dreams in which it is implied that he and his sons will be killed by Þorsteinn, but that Þorsteinn will later be killed by a mere thrall. Soon afterwards, Þorsteinn personally kills Þórhaddr’s three sons, and although the ending of the saga has also been lost, we can assume that he subsequently kills Þórhaddr himself in a second encounter.

Þorsteinn's fate is related in a separate þáttr (a short-story version of a saga) called Draumr Þorsteins Síðu-Hallssonar ('The Dream of Þorsteinn Síðu-Hallsson').

== See also ==
- Draumr Þorsteins Síðu-Hallssonar
