= Draumr Þorsteins Síðu-Hallssonar =

Medieval Icelandic tale

Draumr Þorsteins Síðu-Hallssonar (The Dream of Þorsteinn Son of Síðu-Hallr) is a very short þáttr which tells how Torstein Side-Hallsson (Þorsteins Síðu-Hallssonar) was visited in dreams by three women who warned him that he would soon be murdered. It was written at the end of the 13th century. The Torstein Side-Hallsson Saga (Þorsteins saga Síðu-Hallssonar) has only been incompletely preserved, and it is believed that this short story about Torstein's dream must have originally been part of the lost, more complete saga.

As Torstein was sleeping, three women appeared to him. They warned him that his slave Gilli was willing to avenge for he had been castrated on Torstein's orders. They advised him to kill him but the slave was nowhere to be found. They came back the next two nights and again forecast his death, as well as his son's. The night after, Gilli cut Torstein's throat as he was asleep. He was caught by Torstein's servants, tortured to death and his body was thrown into a fen. The three dream-women (draumkonur) referred to in this tale are very likely to be fylgjur.

== Other sources ==
- Boyer, Régis (trans) (1999) Les Sagas miniatures (þættir) (Paris: Les Belles Lettres) ISBN 2-251-32431-3
