= Joseph C. Harris =

Joseph C. Harris (born 1940) is Francis Lee Higginson Research Professor in English and Research Professor of Folklore at Harvard University.

== Career ==
A scholar of Old English, Old Norse, folklore, and mythology, he earned a B.A. from the University of Georgia in 1961, a B.A. from Cambridge University in 1963 (with the support of a Marshall Scholarship), and his Ph.D. from Harvard in 1969 with a dissertation on Old Icelandic literature (The King and the Icelander: a study in the short narrative forms of Old Icelandic prose). He taught at Stanford and Cornell for thirteen years before returning to Harvard in 1985; he retired in 2012.

Some of his major works include Child’s Children: Ballad Study and Its Legacies (ed. with Barbara Hillers, 2012), ‘Speak Useful Words or Say Nothing’: Old Norse Studies by Joseph Harris (2008), and Prosimetrum: Crosscultural Perspectives on Narrative in Prose and Verse (ed. 1997). Author of over 100 scholarly articles, he also contributed to Seamus Heaney's best-selling translation of Beowulf.

His research has been supported by grants from the Netherlands Institute for Advanced Study, the German Academic Exchange Service, the Fulbright Program, the Guggenheim Foundation, the American Council of Learned Societies, the National Endowment for the Humanities, the Deutsche Forschungsgemeinschaft, and the Rockefeller Foundation. He is a corresponding fellow of the Royal Gustavus Adolpus Academy, Uppsala, Sweden.
