= Kjalnesinga saga =

13th-century Icelandic saga

Kjalnesinga saga (Icelandic pronunciation: [ˈcʰalˌnɛːsiŋka ˈsaːɣa], Old Norse pronunciation: [ˈcʰalˌnɛsɪŋga ˈsaɣa] lit. 'saga of the people of Kjalarnes' (Note: Kjalnesinga is the genitive plural form of Kjalnesingr, the demonym of Kjalarnes.)) is one of the sagas of Icelanders (Íslendingasögur). It is preserved in a parchment manuscript AM 471 4to.

The work concerns historical ages from the ninth to eleventh centuries, and was composed in the fourteenth century, among the last group of sagas composed. The saga is about Búi Andríðsson, his wife Fríðr and his son Jökull Búason. The story takes place in Iceland and Norway. Búi becomes a chieftain of Iceland but dies in a quarrel with his son Jökull. The tale continues with the adventures of Jökull in the short story (þáttr) Jökuls þáttr Búasonar.

== Translations ==
- Waggoner, Ben (2010). Sagas of Giants and Heroes. New Haven, CT: Troth Publications. ISBN 978-0578059334. (Saga of the People of Kjalarnes, pp. 21–52)
