= Germanic boar helmet =

Decorated helmet in Germanic cultures

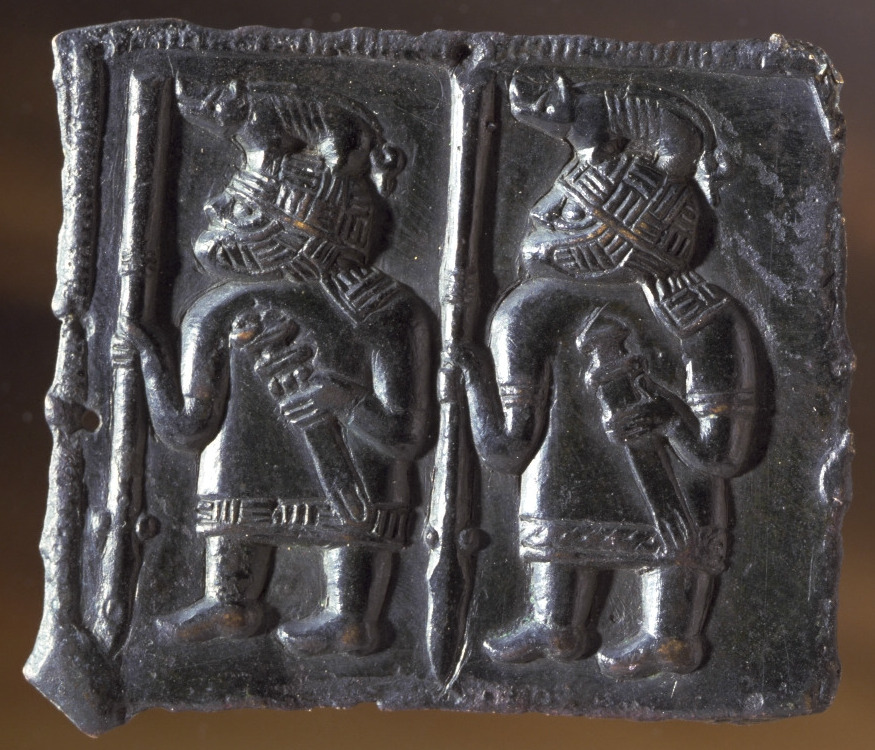
Warriors wearing boar-crested helmets on a Torslunda plate, dated to between the 6th and 8th century CE.

Germanic boar helmets or boar crested helmets are attested in archaeological finds from England, Denmark and Sweden, dating to Vendel and Anglo-Saxon periods, and Old English and Old Norse written sources. They consist of helmets decorated with either a boar crest or other boar imagery that was believed to offer protection in battle to the wearer. They have also been proposed to be a costume for the ritual transformation into a boar, similar to berserkers, and to be associated with Freyr.

== Context ==
=== Roman, Celtic and Baltic ===
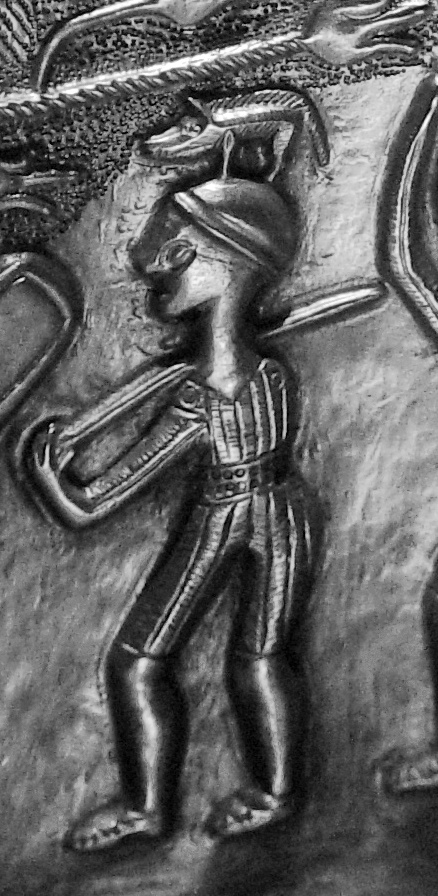
Gundestrup cauldron depiction, dating to between 200 BCE and 300 CE

The boar was an important symbol in prehistoric Europe, where, according to the archaeologist Jennifer Foster, it was "venerated, eulogised, hunted and eaten ... for millennia, until its virtual extinction in recent historical time." Anglo-Saxon and Vendel era boar symbols are preceded by a thousand years of similar iconography, coming after La Tène examples in the fourth century BCE, Gaulish specimens three centuries later, and Roman boars in the fourth century CE. The boar is said to have been sacred to a mother goddess figure among linguistically Celtic communities in Iron Age Europe, while the Roman historian Tacitus, writing around the first century CE, suggested that the Baltic Aesti wore boar symbols in battle to invoke her protection. Four legions, including the twentieth that was stationed in Britain, also adopted the boar as their emblem. The sole unequivocal depictions of boar-crested helmets outside of Germanic sources are on interior plate E of the Gundestrup cauldron, dating to the La Tène period or early Roman Iron Age, which is commonly believed to be Celtic in origin but also has elements suggesting Thracian origin.

=== Germanic ===
Boars had a prominent role for the Germanic peoples and were closely associated with battle. The boar's snout formation was a wedge formation first attested in the 4th century CE, used by the Germanic peoples and named due to its appearance. The formation was also used in the medieval period, as attested in sources such as Knýtlinga saga and Ólafs saga Tryggvasonar. In Gesta Danorum, Book VII, the formation is taught by Odin to Harald Wartooth, who was named due to the tusks he grew to replace two of his teeth that fell out while he was young.

In mythological sources, the boar Saehrimnir is killed each day to feed the einherjar, while Gullinbursti and Hildisvíni are owned by the gods Freyr and Freyja respectively. Both Freyr and Freyja share names with swine, with boars referred to as Vaningi, a name for Freyr, and Freyja as Sýr (sow). In a ritual context, swine are often sacrificed and eaten during blóts (in particular the sonarblót), and are central in some forms of heitstrenging, where the boar is described as being holy. Scholars have proposed the sonarblót was devoted to Freyr, while in the U and H manuscripts of Hervarar saga ok Heiðreks, the link between the god and Heitstrenging is explicit. Guldgubbar finds include figures of swine and their ritual deposition has been linked with Vanir worship.

Boar symbolism and religious practice is closely associated with Sweden, a cultic centre for Freyr, and where it has been suggested to have been a totemic animal. Both the Swedish Yngling royal family and families of Icelandic settlers that can be traced back to Sweden are described as specifically worshiping Freyr and owning boars. A number of Germanic names feature as an element in names related to jǫfurr (derived from Proto-Germanic: *eburaR, wild boar) such as Jǫfurfǫst and Jǫfurbjǫrn, attested in Swedish runic inscriptions, and Eofor, a Geat in Beowulf. In later sources, jǫfurr the meaning of 'boar' and has been predominantly replaced by 'ruler' or 'prince'. This transition has been proposed due to the association between boar helmets and nobility.

Despite the numerous associations between boars and the Vanir, Freyr and Freyja, the boar also has symbolism in its own right and is not always linked with the gods.

== Archeological record ==
=== Helmets and fragments ===
Both boar-crested helmets and crest fragments dating to the Anglo-Saxon period have been discovered in England such as the Benty Grange helmet found in Derbyshire, dating to the 7th century CE. Boars also feature on the eyebrow terminals of the Sutton Hoo helmet which shares features both with other Anglo-Saxon and Vendel-era helmets, and has been suggested to have been made in Sweden. It has been proposed that a post-Roman introduction of a Germanic tradition from the European mainland, rather than the continuation of a tradition in Britain through 400 years of Roman rule, resulted in the return to prominence in the Anglo-Saxon period.

The Benty Grange boar has been suggested to have originally been fitted with boar bristles which would form an accentuated dorsal crest, a motif that has been suggested to point towards the animal's aggression and ferocity, consistent with martial associations. It has also been proposed that the golden decoration of the boar represents Freyr's boar Gullinbursti who has golden bristles, however there is no direct evidence that this story was known in England at the time of construction.

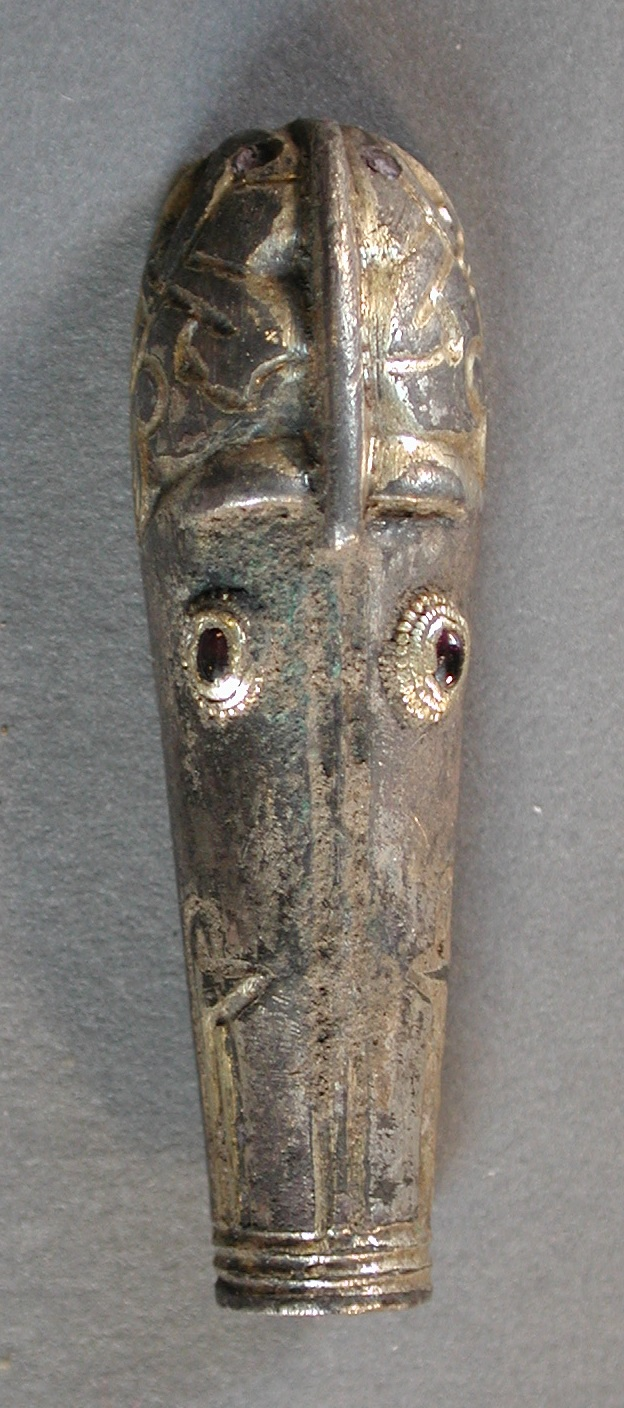
Horncastle boar crest fragment

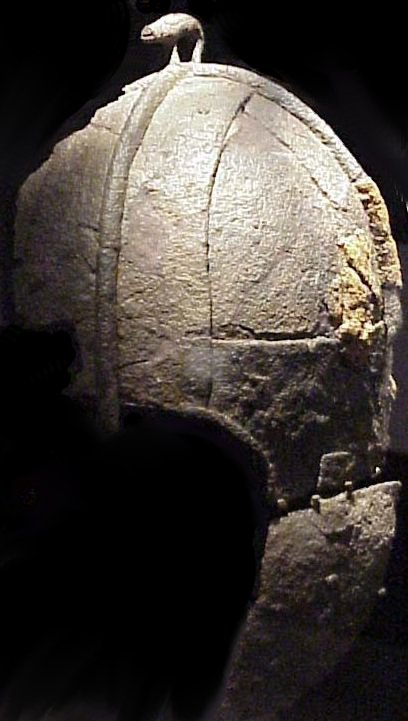
Wollaston Helmet

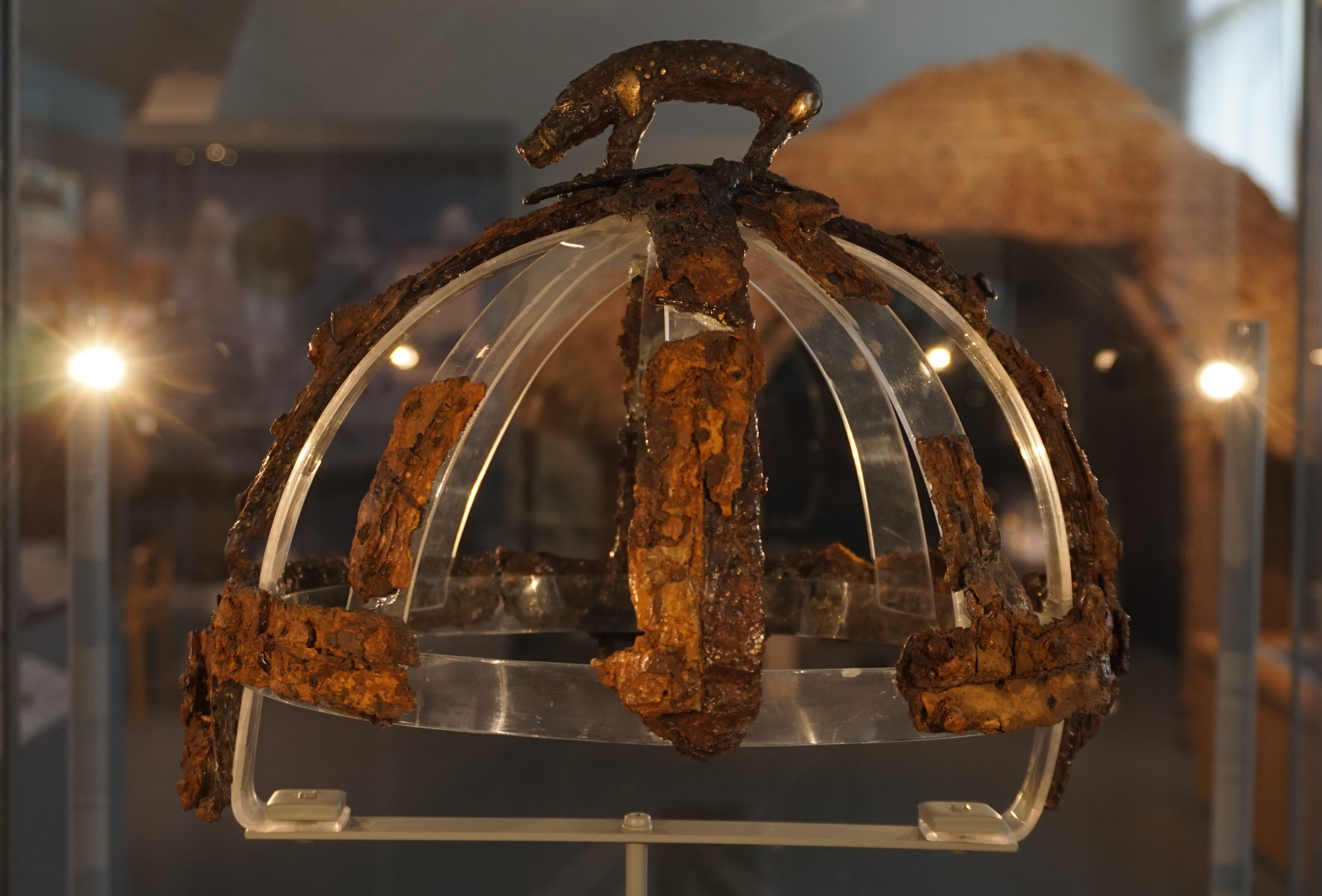
Benty Grange helmet

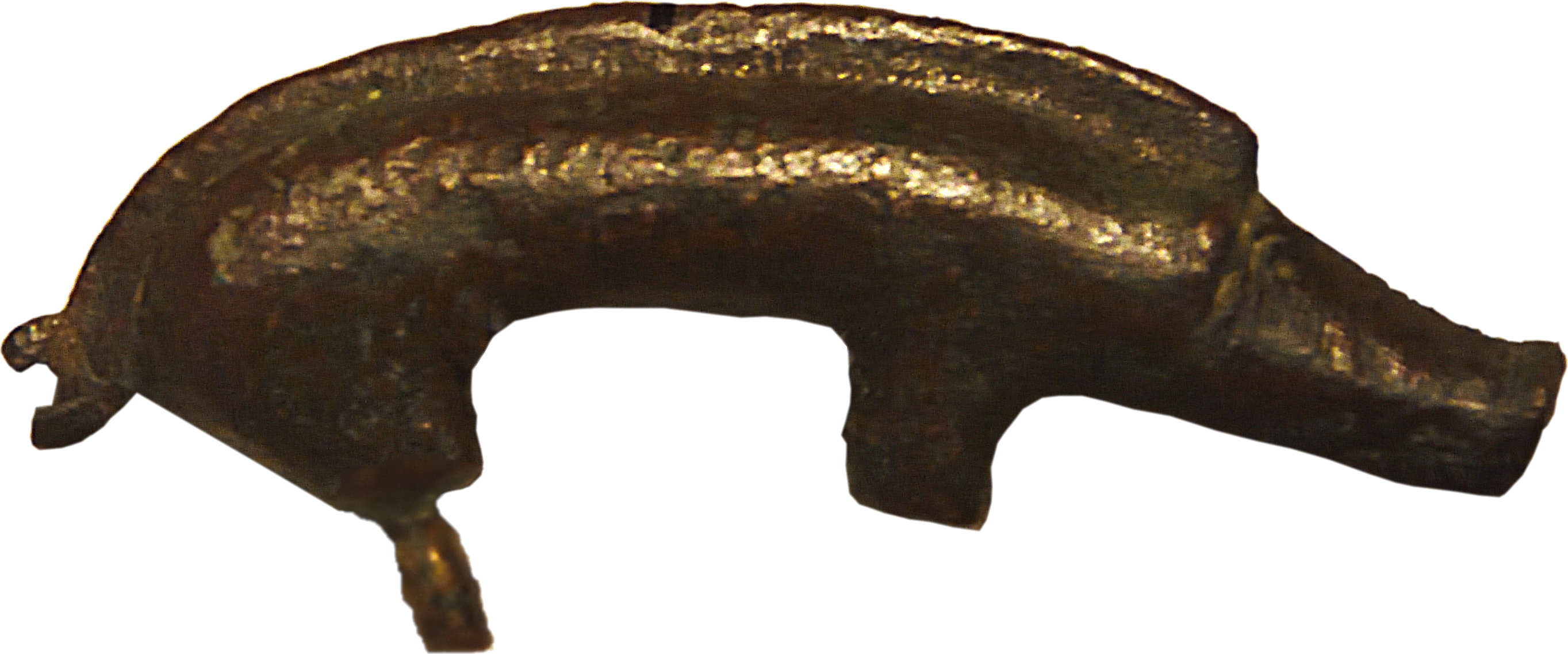
Guilden Morden boar crest fragment

=== Images ===
Unlike those found in England, no Scandinavian helmets have yet been discovered with boar crests, however plates depicting them have been found in Sweden, dating to the Vendel era. The Vendel I helmet, dated to approximately 650 CE has plates showing a rider accompanied by a bird of prey with a boar-crested helmet. Similarly, the Valsgärde 7 helmet has a plate depicting two warriors carrying spears and wearing boar-crested helmets, a motif that bears a strong resemblance to one of the 6th century Torslunda plates. It has been suggested that the helmets depicted on these plates are of an older style than the helmets that the plates are decorating.

== Literary attestations ==
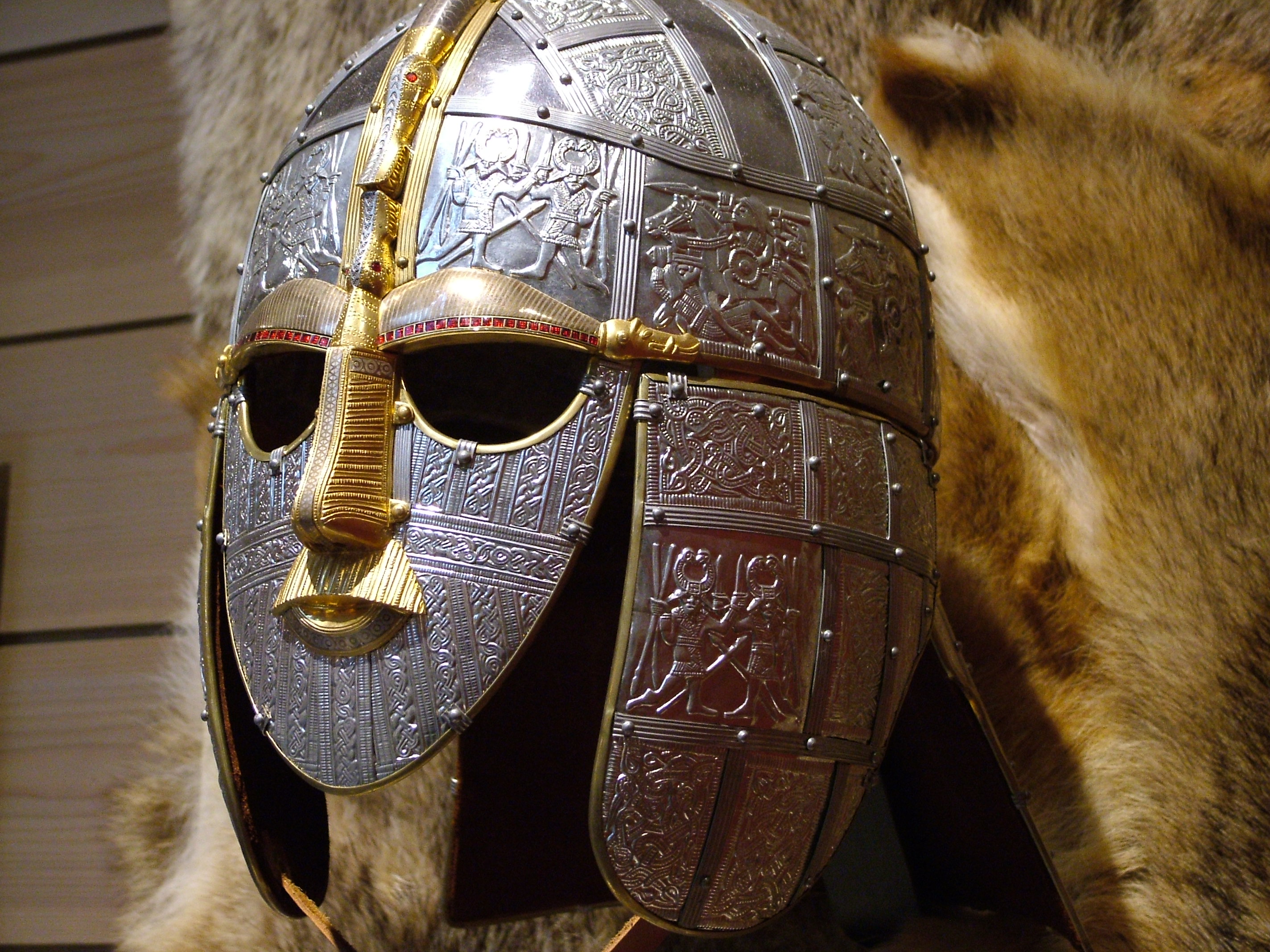
Replica of the Sutton Hoo helmet showing the gilded boar terminals on the eyebrows. (Note: The impression of design 4 on the top left corner of the replica cheek guard is actually upside down.)

=== Old English ===
==== Beowulf ====
Boar helmets are referenced in the Anglo-Saxon poem Beowulf five times. In three cases they appear to feature freestanding boars atop the helmets, like the Guilden Morden example. Such is the case when Grendel's mother seeks vengeance for the death of her son.

Com þa to Heorote, ðær Hring-Dene
geond þæt sæld swæfun. Þa ðær sona wearð
edhwyrft eorlum, siþðan inne fealh
Grendles modor. Wæs se gryre læssa
efne swa micle, swa bið mægþa cræft,
wiggryre wifes be wæpnedmen,
þonne heoru bunden, hamere geþruen,
sweord swate fah swin ofer helme
ecgum dyhtig andweard scireð.
Ða wæs on healle heardecg togen
sweord ofer setlum, sidrand manig
hafen handa fæst; helm ne gemunde,
byrnan side, þa hine se broga angeat.

— Old English text
Translation:

She came to Heorot. There, inside the hall,
Danes lay asleep, earls who would soon endure
a great reversal, once Grendel's mother
attacked and entered. Her onslaught was less
only by as much as an amazon warrior's
strength is less than an armed man's
when the hefted sword, its hammered edge
and gleaming blade slathered in blood,
razed the sturdy boar-ridge off a helmet.
Then in the hall, hard-honed swords
were grabbed from the bench, many a broad shield
lifted and braced; there was little thought of helmets
or woven mail when they woke in terror.

— Heaney Translation

In another case, Hrōðgār laments the death of his advisor by Grendel's mother:

Ne frín þú æfter saélum, sorh is geníwod
Denigea léodum, déad is Æschere
Yrmenláfes yldra bróþor
mín rúnwita ond mín raédbora
eaxlgestealla, ðonne we on orlege
hafelan weredon, þonne hniton feþan,
eoferas cnysedan, swylc eorl scolde
wesan aérgód swylc Æschere wæs.

— Old English text
Translation:

Ask not for news of happy hours! Sorrow is come anew upon the
people of the Danes. Dead is Æschere,
the elder son of Yrmenlaf;
my counsels were his and his wisdom mine,
at my right hand he stood when on fatal field
we fended our lives, as the ranks clashed in battle
and the boar-crests rang. Such should a good man be,
of noble birth long tried in deeds, even as was Æschere!

— Tolkien Translation

In two instances, boars are referred to in the plural, such as when Beowulf and his men leave their ship as "[b]oar-shapes flashed above their cheek-guards" (Old English: eoforlic scionon ofer hleorbergan) These references may refer instead boars like those on the eyebrows of the Sutton Hoo helmet, as opposed to crests.

==== Elene ====
In the poem Elene, the word eoforcumbol appears twice and has been translated as "boar-crest on a helmet" or "boar-banner". In this context, it is presented both as a symbol of protection, and as a heathen symbol that is contrasted with the Christian cross.

=== Old Norse ===
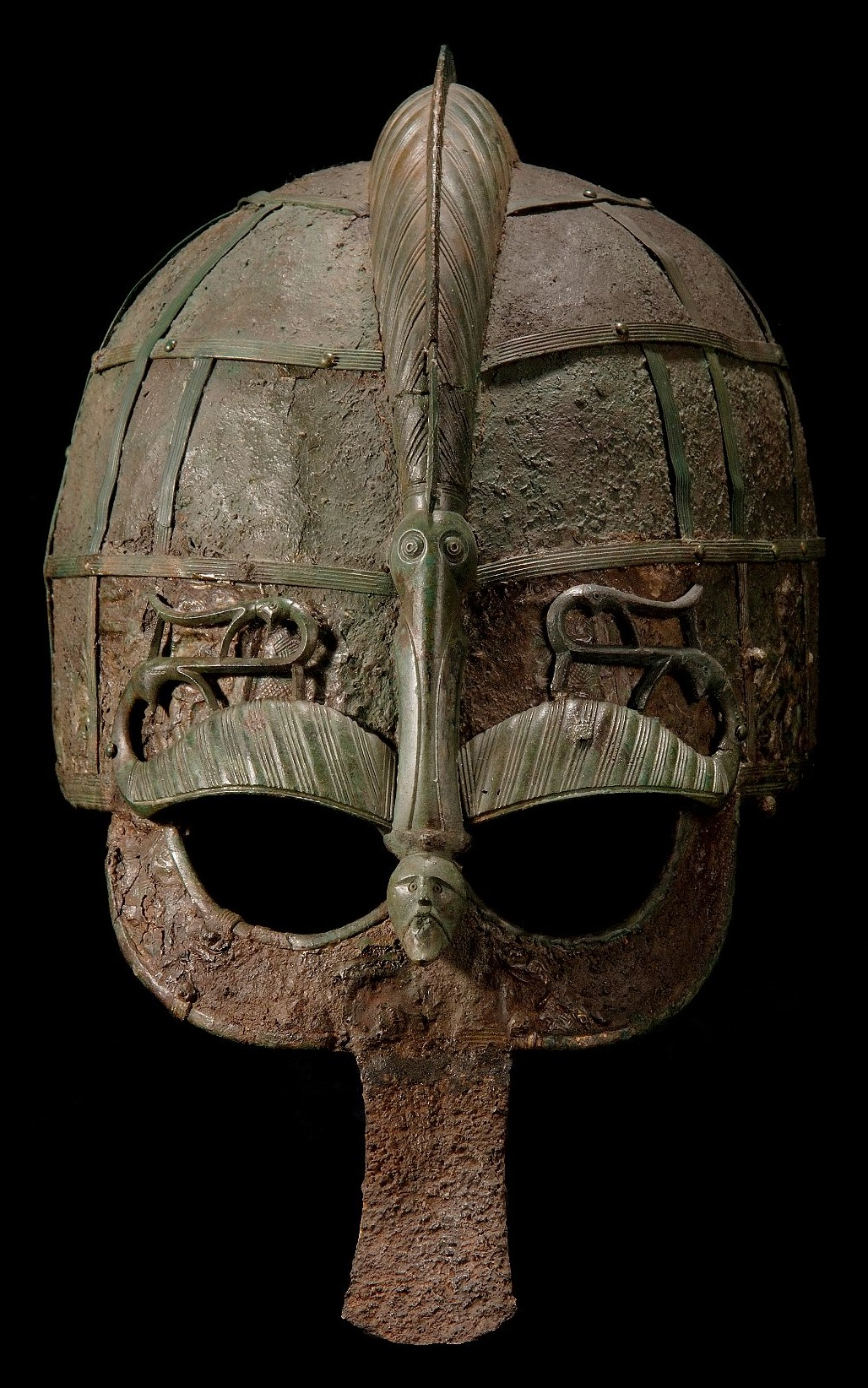
Vendel I helmet, dating to c.650 CE

In Old Norse sources, helmets may be associated with boars, in particular those of the Yngling royal house. The Swedish king Aðils owned the helmets Hildisvín ('Battle-swine') and Hildigǫltr ('Battle-boar'), the former of which was inherited from another Yngling, his parental uncle Áli. Hildigǫltr is also listed as a heiti for a helmet in Nafnaþulur, and is attested in the skaldic poetry of Háttatal:

Holt felr hildigelti
heila bæs, ok deilir
gulls í gelmis stalli
gunnseið, skörungr, reiðir.

— Old Norse text
Translation:

The outstanding one covers the hill of the dwelling of the brain (his cranium) with a battle boar (helmet)
and the distributor of gold
brandishes the battle fish (sword)
in the hawk's perch (hand).

— Faulkes translation

The heiti valgǫltr is also used in Hrafnsmál as part of a battle kenning:

Feldi folks valdi
fyrst ens gollbyrsta
velti valgaltar
Vígfús þanns hétu;
slíta þar síðan
sôrum benskárar
brôð af bǫð-Nirði,
Bjarnar arfnytja.

— Old Norse text
Translation:

First the Folk-wielder
Felled there the feller
Of fight-boar gold-bristled,
Vigfus men hight him.
The wound-mews thereafter
There were they tearing
Full meat of fight-god,
Biorn's heirship wearer.

— Morris translation

It has been further proposed that the helmet heiti valhrímnir and hallhrímnir refer to swine through the component -hrimnir, a heiti for swine attested in Nafnaþulur also found as a suffix in the name Sæhrímnir.

== Function of imagery ==
Boar imagery on Anglo-Saxon helmets is associated explicitly with protection in Beowulf where the poet describes the figures on helmets kept watch over the warriors wearing them. It has been proposed that the figures have an apotropaic role and that cutting them off will result in the death of the warrior. In the latter case, the boar and warrior appear to be regarded as a singular entity with a shared life.

It has also been proposed that, similar to úlfheðnar and berserkers, putting on a boar-helmet may be akin to shape-changing, allowing the wearer to take on qualities of the animal, in addition to its appearance. Consistent with this is a helmet plate from Vendel grave XIV in Uppland that depicts two warriors with bird-crest helmets, one of which also has boar tusks, suggesting it is the armour that makes them a representation of the animal. People in medieval Germanic literature can be referred to as boars such as Ragnar Loðbrók in his eponymous saga. In the case of Kjalnesinga saga, a warrior is specifically described as having boar-like teeth when fighting. While úlfheðnar and berserkers are frequently in service to kings, they are commonly portrayed negatively, instead of as noble heroes, and lacking control over their actions. On the other hand, identification or comparison with a wild boar is positive and closely associated with the warrior elite. The distinction has been suggested to result from bears and wolves being predatory, while boars, though fierce and often fighting to the death when cornered, forage rather than hunt.

== See also ==
- Boar's tusk helmet

== Bibliography ==
=== Primary ===
- Klaeber, Friedrich (1922). Beowulf and The Fight at Finnsburg. Boston: D.C. Heath & Company.
- Byock, Jesse (1999). The Saga of King Hrolf Kraki. The Penguin Group. ISBN 014043593X.
- Heaney, Seamus (2000). Beowulf: A New Verse Translation. New York: W. W. Norton. ISBN 0-393-32097-9.
- Morris, William; Eirikr, Magnusson (2019). The Story of the Ere-Dwellers (Eyrbyggja Saga), Chapter 26. Alpha Editions. ISBN 9789353705411.
- Sturluson, Snorri. "Nafnaþulur". heimskringla.no.
- Sturluson, Snorri (1987). Edda. Translated by Faulkes, Anthony. London: Everyman.
- Sturluson, Snorri (2007). Faulkes, Anthony (ed.). Edda. Háttatal (Second ed.). London: Viking Society for Northern Research. ISBN 978-0903521680.
- Tacitus (1868). "Germany and its Tribes". The Agricola and Germania of Tacitus. Translated by Church, Alfred John & Brodribb, William Jackson. London: Macmillan. ISBN 978-1-02-237238-2.
- Tacitus (1886). "Germania". In Church, Alfred John & Brodribb, William Jackson (eds.). The Agricola and Germania of Tacitus: With a Revised Text, English Notes, and Maps. London: Macmillan.
- Tolkien, J. R. R. (2014). Beowulf : a translation and commentary, together with Sellic spell. London: Harper Collins Publishers. ISBN 9780007590070.
- Trefilsson, Þormóðr. Quinn, Judy (ed.). "Hrafnsmál". Skaldic Poetry of the Scandinavian Middle Ages.

=== Secondary ===
- Aldhouse-Green, Miranda J. (1992). Animals in Celtic life and myth. London: Routledge. ISBN 0415185882.
- Bateman, Thomas (1861). Ten Years' Digging in Celtic and Saxon Grave Hills, in the Counties of Derby, Stafford, and York, from 1848 to 1858; with Notices of some Former Discoveries, Hitherto Unpublished, and Remarks on the Crania and Pottery from the Mounds. London: John Russell Smith. pp. 28–33.
- Bruce-Mitford, Rupert (Autumn 1972). "The Sutton Hoo Helmet: A New Reconstruction". The British Museum Quarterly. XXXVI (3–4). British Museum: 120–130. doi:10.2307/4423116. JSTOR 4423116.
- Bruce-Mitford, Rupert (1974). Aspects of Anglo-Saxon Archaeology: Sutton Hoo and Other Discoveries. London: Victor Gollancz Limited. ISBN 0-575-01704-X.
- Chaney, William A. (1970). The Cult of Kingship in Anglo-Saxon England: The Transition from Paganism to Christianity. Manchester: Manchester University Press. ISBN 0-520-01401-4.
- Cramp, Rosemary J. (1957). "Beowulf and Archaeology" (PDF). Medieval Archaeology. 1. Society for Medieval Archaeology: 57–77. doi:10.1080/00766097.1957.11735382.
- Davidson, Hilda Ellis (1968). "Archaeology and Beowulf". In Garmonsway, George Norman & Simpson, Jacqueline (eds.). Beowulf and its Analogues. London: J. M. Dent & Sons. pp. 350–360. OCLC 421931242.
- Foster, Jennifer (1977a). "Notes and News: A boar figurine from Guilden Morden, Cambs" (PDF). Medieval Archaeology. XXI. Society for Medieval Archaeology: 166–167. doi:10.5284/1000320.
- Foster, Jennifer (1977b). "Bronze Boar Figurines in Iron Age and Roman Britain". British Archaeological Reports. 39. BAR Publishing. ISBN 978-0-904531-74-9.
- Frank, Roberta (2008). "The Boar on the Helmet". In Karkov, Catherine E. & Damico, Helen (eds.). Aedificia Nova: Studies in Honor of Rosemary Cramp. Publications of the Richard Rawlinson Center. Kalamazoo: Medieval Institute Publications, Western Michigan University. pp. 76–88. ISBN 978-1-58044-110-0.
- Hatto, Arthur Thomas (1957). "Snake-Swords and Boar-Helmets in Beowulf". English Studies. XXXVIII (4): 145–160. doi:10.1080/00138385708596994.
- Kovárová, Lenka (2011). The Swine in Old Nordic Religion and Worldview. Háskóla Íslands (Thesis).
- McKinnell, John (2005). Meeting the other in Norse myth and legend. Woodbridge, Suffolk, UK: D.S. Brewer. ISBN 1843840421.
- Newton, Sam (1993). The Origins of Beowulf and the Pre-Viking Kingdom of East Anglia. Cambridge University Press. ISBN 9780859914727.
- Simek, Rudolf (2007). Hall, Angela (ed.). Dictionary of Northern Mythology. Cambridge: D. S. Brewer. ISBN 9780859915137.
- Speake, George (1980). Anglo-Saxon Animal Art. Oxford: Clarendon Press. ISBN 0-19-813194-1. LCCN 79-41091.
- Stiegemann, Christoph; Kroker, Martin & Walter, Wolfgang, eds. (2013). CREDO: Christianisierung Europas im Mittelalter (in German). Vol. II: Katalog. Petersberg: Michael Imhof Verlag. ISBN 978-3-86568-827-9.
- Sundqvist, Olof (2000). Freyr's Offspring. Rulers and Religion in Ancient Svea Society. Uppsala: Uppsala University Press. ISBN 9155452639.
- "The boar on the replica Benty Grange helmet". I Dig Sheffield. Museums Sheffield.
