= 1030 =

Calendar year

1030 in various calendars
- Gregorian calendar: 1030; MXXX
- Ab urbe condita: 1783
- Armenian calendar: 479; ԹՎ ՆՀԹ
- Assyrian calendar: 5780
- Balinese saka calendar: 951–952
- Bengali calendar: 436–437
- Berber calendar: 1980
- English Regnal year: N/A
- Buddhist calendar: 1574
- Burmese calendar: 392
- Byzantine calendar: 6538–6539
- Chinese calendar: 己巳年 (Earth Snake); 3727 or 3520 — to — 庚午年 (Metal Horse); 3728 or 3521
- Coptic calendar: 746–747
- Discordian calendar: 2196
- Ethiopian calendar: 1022–1023
- Hebrew calendar: 4790–4791
- Hindu calendars
- Vikram Samvat: 1086–1087
- Shaka Samvat: 951–952
- Kali Yuga: 4130–4131
- Holocene calendar: 11030
- Igbo calendar: 30–31
- Iranian calendar: 408–409
- Islamic calendar: 420–421
- Japanese calendar: Chōgen 3 (長元３年)
- Javanese calendar: 932–933
- Julian calendar: 1030; MXXX
- Korean calendar: 3363
- Minguo calendar: 882 before ROC 民前882年
- Nanakshahi calendar: −438
- Seleucid era: 1341/1342 AG
- Thai solar calendar: 1572–1573
- Tibetan calendar: ས་མོ་སྦྲུལ་ལོ་ (female Earth-Snake); 1156 or 775 or 3 — to — ལྕགས་ཕོ་རྟ་ལོ་ (male Iron-Horse); 1157 or 776 or 4

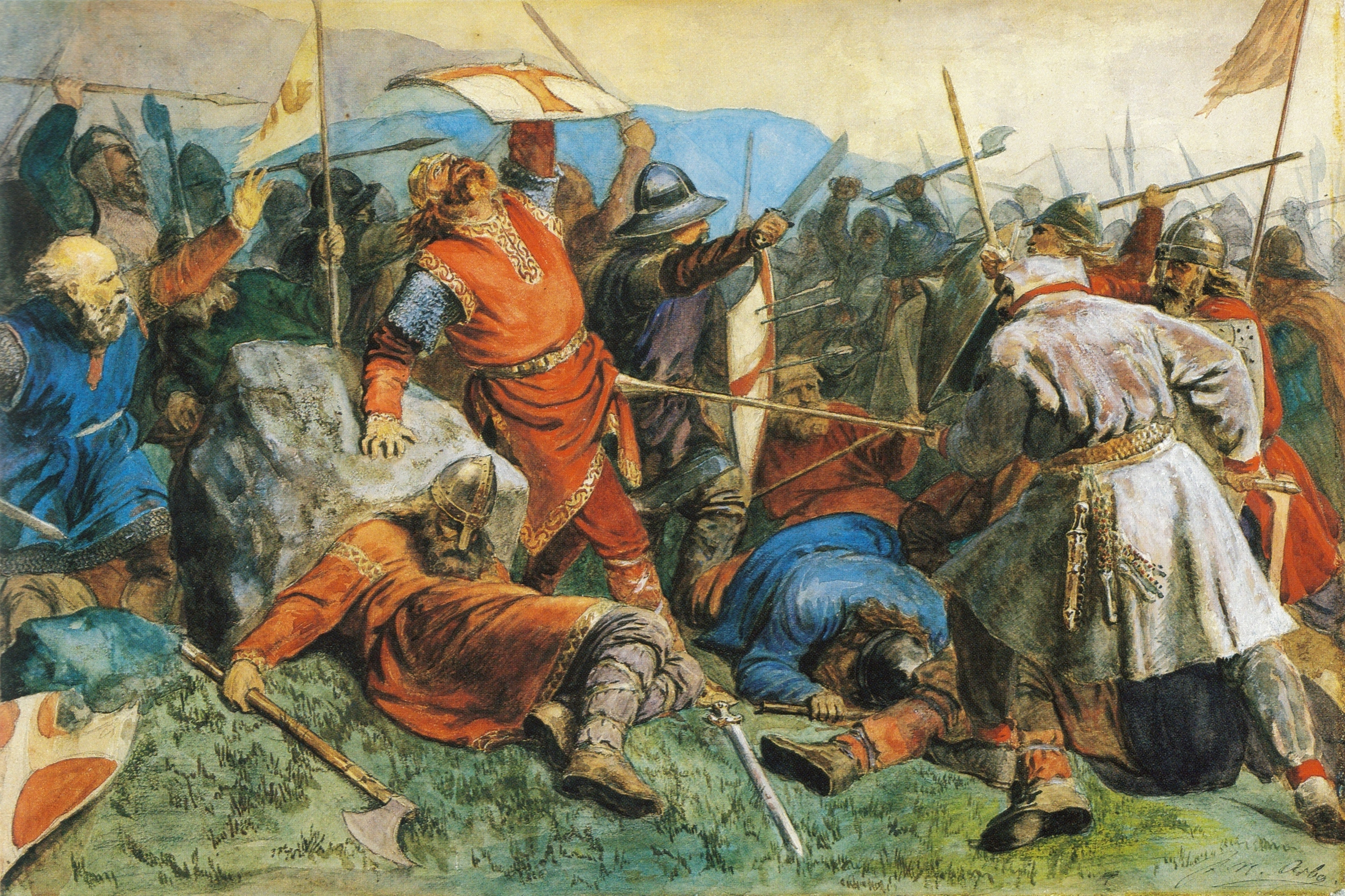
King Olaf II (left) is killed at the Battle of Stiklestad

Year 1030 (MXXX) was a common year starting on Thursday of the Julian calendar.

== Events ==
=== By place ===
==== Byzantine Empire ====
- Emperor Romanos III Argyros decides to retaliate upon the incursions of the Muslims on the eastern frontier. He leads a Byzantine expeditionary force (20,000 men) to secure Antioch. The Mirdasid emir Shibl al-Dawla Nasr of Aleppo sues for peace, but Romanos refuses to negotiate and leads his army against Aleppo, against the advice of his generals. The Byzantine army encamped near Azaz, where they were encircled by the Mirdasids' Bedouin troops, who cut off the Byzantines from food and water.
- August 10 – Romanos orders a retreat to Antioch. As the army is exhausted from the heat and the lack of supplies, the retreat soon turns into a flight in panic. Romanos returns to Constantinople in humiliation, but his generals on the eastern frontier manage to salvage the situation: a Fatimid attack on Maraclea is repulsed, and Azaz itself is captured in December after a brief siege. In April/May 1031, Emir Nasr of Aleppo agreed to vassal and tributary status with Byzantium.

==== Europe ====
- July – Emperor Conrad II (the Elder) leads an invasion into Hungary. He plunders the lands west of the River Rába but suffers from the consequences of the scorched earth tactics used by the Hungarians. Conrad, threatened by starvation, is forced to retreat to Germany. King Stephen I (St. Stephen) pursued his forces, which were defeated and captured by the Hungarians at Vienna.
- July 29 – Battle of Stiklestad: King Olaf II Haraldsson (St. Olaf) attempts to reconquer Norway with help from King Anund Jakob of Sweden. He is defeated by a superior Norwegian peasant and Danish army (14,000 men). Olaf is killed in the battle. He is later canonized and becomes the patron saint of Norway and Rex perpetuum Norvegiae ('the eternal king of Norway').
- The first mention is made of Tartu, Estonia, as Grand Prince Yaroslav I (the Wise) of Novgorod and Kiev defeats the Estonians and finds a fort named Yuryev (modern-day Tartu). The Rus' will hold the fortress for 30 or 31 years.
- The first mention is made of Thalwil, Switzerland, derived from Tellewilare and indicates the early medieval origins of Thalwil as an Alemannic farmstead.
- Henry I revolts against his father, King Robert II (the Pious), in a civil war over power and property. Robert's army is defeated, and he retreats to Beaugency.

==== Asia ====
- April 30 – Sultan Mahmud of Ghazni dies after a 28-year reign. He is succeeded by his son Mas'ud I, who seizes the throne of the Ghaznavid Empire, which includes much of Afghanistan, Iran, and India.
- Ouyang Xiu, a Chinese historian and scholar, obtained his jinshi degree at the age of 23, by passing the imperial examinations in the country, leading him to a distinguished path as a scholar-official.
- The Chola Empire reaches its greatest extent.

== Births ==
- July 21 – Kyansittha, king of the Pagan Empire (Burma)
- July 26 – Stanislaus of Szczepanów, bishop of Kraków (d. 1079)
- Adelaide of Eilenburg, German noblewoman (approximate date)
- Anne of Kiev, French queen and regent (approximate date)
- Baldwin VI (the Good), count of Flanders (approximate date)
- Bruno of Cologne, founder of the Carthusian Order (d. 1101)
- Gerard (the Great), duke of Lorraine (approximate date)
- Gertrude of Saxony, countess of Holland (approximate date)
- Manegold of Lautenbach, German priest (approximate date)
- Romanos IV, emperor of the Byzantine Empire (d. 1072)
- Vsevolod I Yaroslavich, Grand Prince of Kiev (d. 1093)
- Walter of Pontoise, French abbot (approximate date)
- William of Hirsau, German abbot (approximate date)

== Deaths ==
- January 10 – Thietmar, margrave of the Saxon Ostmark
- January 31 – William V (the Great), duke of Aquitaine (b. 969)
- March 10 – Welf II, German nobleman (Elder House of Welf)
- April 30 – Mahmud of Ghazni, Ghaznavid emir (b. 971)
- July 19 – Adalberon, French bishop and poet (or 1031)
- July 29
  - Bjørn Stallare, Norwegian servant and diplomat
  - Olaf II Haraldsson (St. Olaf), king of Norway
  - Torstein Knarresmed, Norwegian Viking warrior
- Al-Musabbihi, Fatimid historian and official (b. 977)
- Cú Mara mac Maic Liac, Irish poet and Chief Ollam
- Fan Kuan, Chinese landscape painter (approximate date)
- Gormflaith ingen Murchada, Irish queen (b. 960)
- Krešimir III, king of Croatia (Trpimirović Dynasty)
- Miskawayh, Persian official and philosopher (b. 932)
- Skapti Þóroddsson, Icelandic lawspeaker and skald
- Tadg in Eich Gil, king of Connacht (approximate date)
- William IV, count of Provence (approximate date)
