= Einar Thambarskelfir =

Norwegian viking caudillo

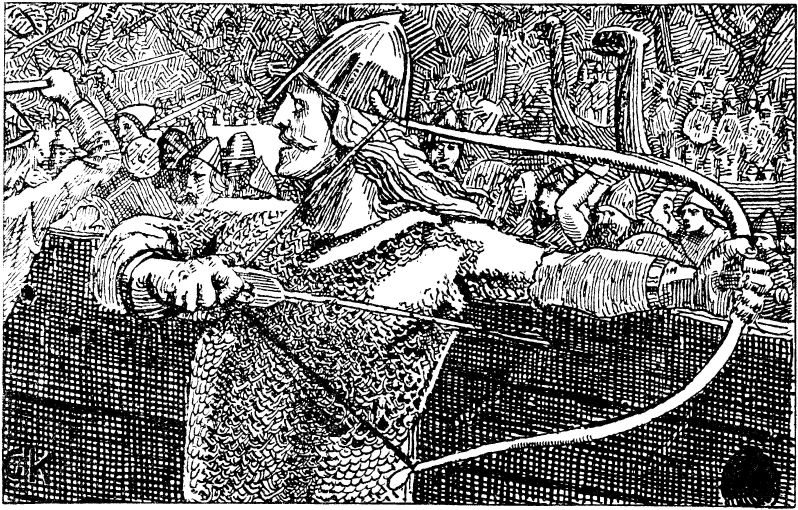
At the Battle of Svolder, Einar Thambarskelfir tries the king's bow and finds it too weak.

Einar Eindridesson Thambarskelfir (c. 980–c. 1050) (Old Norse: Einarr Þambarskelfir, Norwegian: Einar Tambarskjelve) was an influential Norwegian noble and politician during the 11th century. He headed the feudal lords in their opposition to Olaf Haraldsson.

Several references are made to him in Snorri Sturluson's Heimskringla. His cognomen, Thambarskelfir, has two strongly differing explanations. One is that it is derived from tomb, meaning "shaking bowstring". Thus, the name suggests a master of the longbow. The other is that it is derived from tambr, meaning "belly", and that it translates to "wobbly belly", surely an unflattering reflection of his physical build.

== Background ==
Einarr Thambarskelfir was the son of Eindride, a rich and influential farmer at the Viking Age political center of Melhus. Einar Thambarskelfir was a jarl and chieftain at Husaby, a farm in Skaun municipality, and a powerful warlord with his own army. He descended from the Earls of Lade, one of the dominant families of Norwegian Viking Age politics. He made his debut both as a saga character and in the political arena at the sea Battle of Svolder in 1000, fighting on the losing side of Olaf Tryggvason. From his description of this battle, Snorri presents us with one of the saga's most famous passages:

Einar Tambarskelver, one of the sharpest of bow-shooters, stood by the mast, and shot with his bow. Einar shot an arrow at Earl Eirik [...] Then said the earl to a man called Fin, [...] "Shoot that tall man by the mast." Fin shot; and the arrow hit the middle of Einar's bow just at the moment that Einar was drawing it, and the bow was split in two parts.
"What is that," cried King Olaf, "that broke with such a noise?"
"Norway, king, from your hands," cried Einar.
"No! not quite so much as that," says the king; "take my bow, and shoot," flinging the bow to him.
Einar took the bow, and drew it over the head of the arrow. "Too weak, too weak," said he, "for the bow of a mighty king!" and, throwing the bow aside, he took sword and shield, and fought valiantly.

== Olaf Haraldsson's reign ==
King Olaf Tryggvason disappeared during the battle, though his corpse was never found after the Battle of Svolder. Einar, however, survived, and spent the next decades maneuvring through shifting political waters. Einar, together with Erling Skjalgsson, supported Lade jarl Sveinn Hákonarson against Olaf Haraldsson at the Battle at Nesjar in 1016. While Sveinn had to flee the country after the battle, and Erling was forced to join an uneasy alliance with the new king, Einar remained unscathed. He returned to Melhus and remained an opponent of the king. Therefore, when Danish influences sought to overthrow Olaf Haraldsson in 1028, he supported them. However, he did not join the peasants' army at the Battle of Stiklestad. This was more due to luck than calculation – when news of Olaf's presence in Trøndelag broke, Einarr was in England, making a political visit to the Anglo-Danish King Cnut the Great. However, this move would later pay off handsomely.

After Stiklestad, many Norwegian noblemen felt that King Cnut had promised to install them as rulers of Norway in his place. Einar Thambarskelfir expected that he would be the natural choice, being the oldest opponent of Olaf. However, the Anglo-Danish king instead made his son Svein a viceroy, in effect placing his mother Ælfgifu in charge of his recent conquest. This greatly infuriated Einar.

== Rise to power ==
As the pressure grew more intense on him during Sveinn Knutsson's viceroy reign, Einar made his greatest political masterstroke. He traveled to Garðaríki (later Russia), where he found Olaf's eleven-year-old illegitimate son Magnus (later dubbed 'the Good'). Forming a political alliance with former Stiklestad peasant army leader Kalv Arnesson, he then proceeded to broker an agreement between the puppet king Magnus and the newly installed Danish ruler, Harthacnut, son of Cnut the Great.

Thus, Einar became the de facto ruler of Norway, a position he at this point never could have held if he himself had fought Magnus's father at Stiklestad. Kalv Arnesson and Thorir Hund, two nobles who did, both faded out into insignificance; the latter perhaps forced to go to Jerusalem in search of forgiveness for killing the holy king. While Magnus did assume some power as he grew older, Einar remained a very influential figure throughout his reign.

== Turn of the tide ==
However, around 1045 the aging Einar ran out of luck. At this point, Olaf Haraldsson's half-brother Harald Sigurdsson, later dubbed Hardrada (roughly "harsh ruler"), returned with a vast fortune amassed as a military commander in Constantinople. According to the succession laws put in place by the earlier monarch Harald Fairhair, Harald had a legitimate claim to the throne, a claim he did not hesitate to put forward. Fearing that Harald would turn his economic power into military power, Magnus against Einar's advice let Harald become joint monarch in late 1046. Only a year later, Magnus died, and the strong-willed Harald became sole monarch.

Harald was determined to centralize power, and had little patience with the quarreling nobles and peasant leaders. Thus, he was bound to end up on a collision course with the equally determined Einar Thambarskelfir. Conflict ensued, threatening civil war, and Einar began raising another peasants' army against the increasingly unpopular and tyrannical Harald. However, before this work was completed, Harald appeared to seek reconciliation. He asked Einar for a meeting at his farm in Nidaros, so that the two could sit down and broker an agreement. Harald, of course, had no such intentions. He had decided that Einar had to be removed before his support was too powerful. Thus, when arriving at the king's farm, Einar and his son Eindride were assassinated.

Einar Thambarskelfir in Melhus Municipality's coat of arms.

His widow Bergljot Håkonsdatter raised an army and attacked the king's farm to avenge the murder, but the king manage to escape her.

== Evaluation ==
According to the saga, Einar Thambarskelfir played a crucial role both in terms of the sanctification of Olaf in 1031 and in the restoration of Magnus as Norwegian regent in 1035.

The death of Einar Thambarskelfir concludes two important eras of Norwegian medieval politics. Firstly, he is the last of the Lade family to play a political role at this level. Secondly, he is also the last nobleman to seek power in Norway without a claim based on the succession laws of Harald Fairhair. From this point on, all potential kings – however dubious their alleged relation to the ancient king – would claim to be descended from Harald Fairhair.

== Legacy ==
The coat of arms of Melhus Municipality in Trøndelag county shows an archer, symbolizing the famous chief and archer from Skaun, Einar Thambarskelfir.

== Other sources ==
- Ferguson, Robert. The Vikings: A History (New York City: Penguin Group. 2009) ISBN 978-0-14-311801-5
