= Cnut's invasion of Norway =

Invasion of Norway by Cnut the Great in 1029

Cnut's Invasion of Norway
- Part of Cnut's conquests
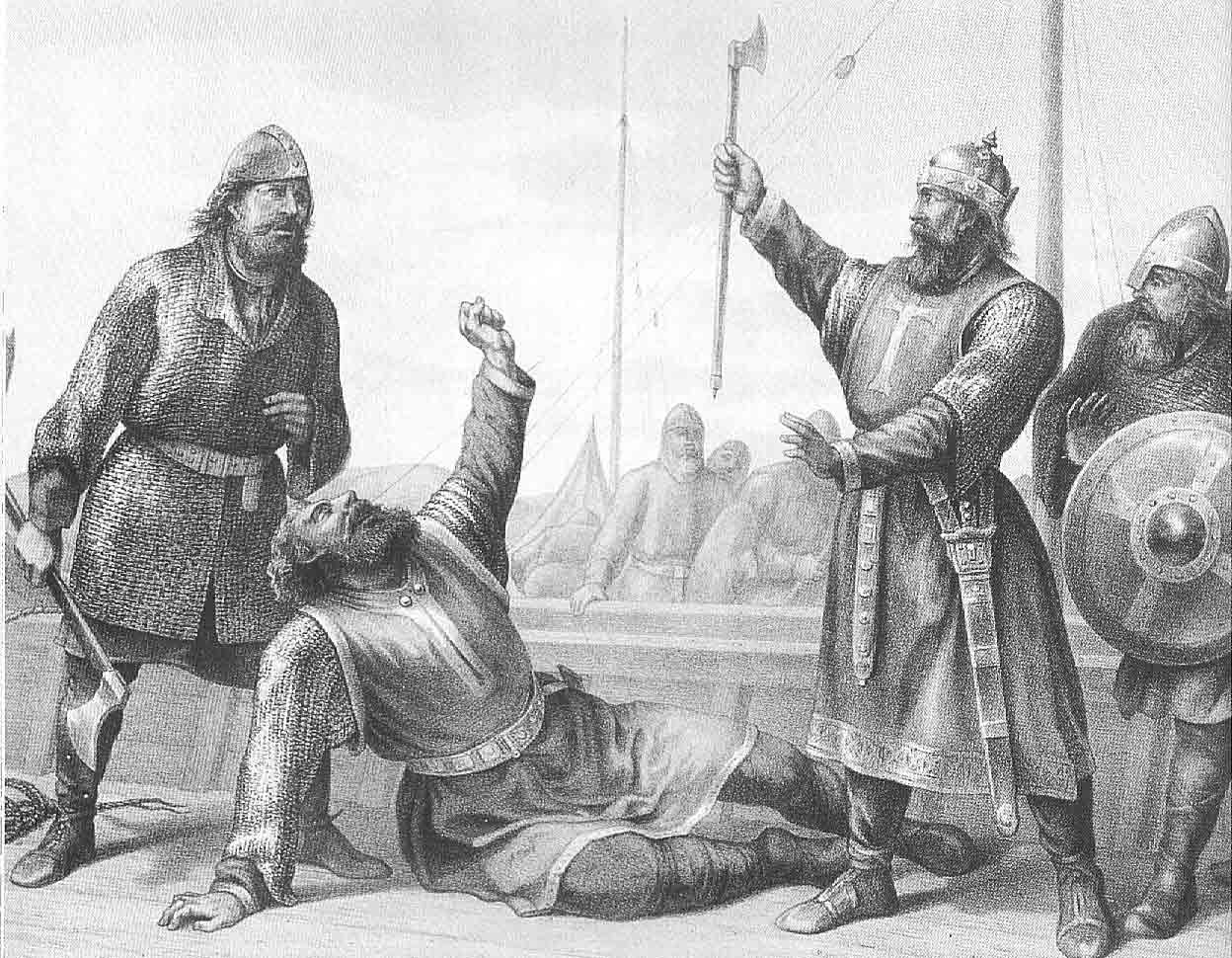
- Death of Erling Skjalgsson in 1028 by Olav's forces, by Peter Nicolai Arbo in 1831
Date	1028 – 1029
Location	Norway
Result	Danish and Norwegian chieftain victory
Territorial changes	Norway conquered by Cnut

Belligerents
North Sea Empire; Norwegian chieftains	Norway

Commanders and leaders
Cnut the Great; Erling Skjalgsson X	Olaf Haraldsson

Strength
50 ships Large force	Unknown, but smaller than the Danes

Casualties and losses
Unknown	Unknown

Cnut, king of Denmark and England, invaded and conquered the Kingdom of Norway without much resistance between 1028 and 1029. The deposed king of Norway, Olaf Haraldson, fled to the Kievan Rus', and Cnut became king of Norway as well.

== Background ==
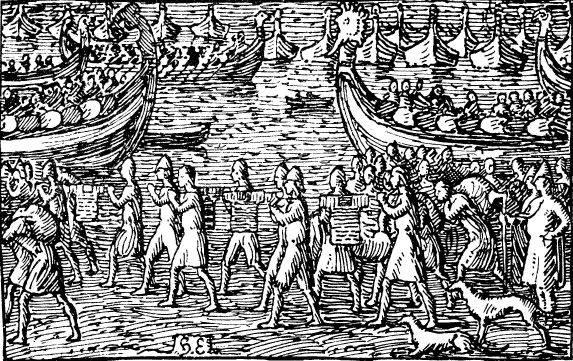
Illustration of Cnut preparing for war against Sweden and Norway, by Halfdan Egedius.

Cnut's father and grandfather, Sweyn Forkbeard and Harald Gormsson, had previously had control in parts of Norway, particularly the area around Oslofjord. Additionally, circumstantial evidence supports that Sweyn Forkbeard held some form of overlordship over the Swedish king, Olaf Skötkonung. As a result of the Danish aggression in Scandinavia, Olaf Haraldson and Olaf Skötkonung made an alliance and attacked Denmark in 1026. After the seemingly inconclusive Battle of Helgeå, Cnut appears to have come out of the overall conflict with fewer losses than his counterparts. The Norwegians in particular, appear to have made a tactical error during the Battle of Helgeå. When the Swedes pulled out their forces to Svealand, Cnut and the Danes stationed their fleet at Øresund, hindering any Norwegian ships to return home. This resulted in the Norwegians abandoning their ships and marching through Sweden to reach Norway.

After this invasion, Cnut began to view his Norse neighbours as potential threats to his power. Subsequently, already in 1027, Danish envoys appeared throughout the Norwegian coast, bribing Norwegian aristocrats into going against Olaf Haraldson.

== Invasion ==
In 1028, Cnut was ready to strike Norway. With 50 ships, Cnut sailed along the Low German shores up to the Limfjord. The ships brought from England were large and well-manned. Olaf was informed of Cnut's fleet and intentions, and he did what he could to meet the invasion. The forces the Norwegians were able to muster, sailed up the Oslofjord and remained there until Cnut had departed from the land. Cnut sailed across the Norwegian coasts, starting from Agder. At important points, Cnut landed and summoned local assemblies. These assemblies generally obeyed Cnut, and the locals swore allegiance to their new king. However, wherever there was occasion to do so, Cnut appointed now local officials that he could trust.

Cnut spent some time in Egersund, where he renewed his alliance with Erling Skjalgsson, who joined him with a large force. When Trondheim (Nidaros) was reached, chieftains from all of Trøndelag were summoned to a grand assembly. Here Cnut was formally proclaimed the true King of Norway.

== Aftermath ==
Notably, there was no reason for Cnut to go further north since representatives from the north were present in the grand assembly. Cnut installed Haakon Ericsson as governor of Norway, yet he would die at sea. Olaf Haraldsson now saw an opportunity to retake to throne, yet was defeated at Stiklestad. However, control over Norway was short-lived for Cnut, and dominion over the kingdom was lost within Cnut's lifetime, most probably in c. 1034.

== See also ==
- Cnut's invasion of England – 1016 Danish conquest of England
- Battle of Stiklestad – 1030 battle in Trøndelag, Norway
- North Sea Empire – 1013–1042 empire in Northwest Europe

== Works cited ==
- Bolton, Timothy (2009). The Empire of Cnut the Great: Conquest and the Consolidation of Power in Northern Europe in the Early Eleventh Century. Brill. ISBN 978-90-04-16670-7.
- Sawyer, Peter (1994). Cnut's Scandinavian Empire. Boston: Brill.
- Larson, Laurence (1912). Canute the Great (PDF). London: G. P. PUTNAM'S SONS.
