= Bergljot =

Bergljot is a Norwegian feminine given name. Notable people with the surname include:

- Bergljót Arnalds (born 1968), Icelandic actress, writer, television representative and producer
- Bergljot Håkonsdatter (c. 990–c. 1055), Norwegian noble
- Bergljot Hobæk Haff (1925–2016), Norwegian educator and novelist
- Bergljot Sandvik-Johansen (1922–2020), Norwegian gymnast, figure skater, and sports official
- Bergljot Larsson (1883–1968), Norwegian nurse, educator, editor and organizational leader
- Bergljot Webster (born 1966), Norwegian judge
