= Torstein Knarresmed =

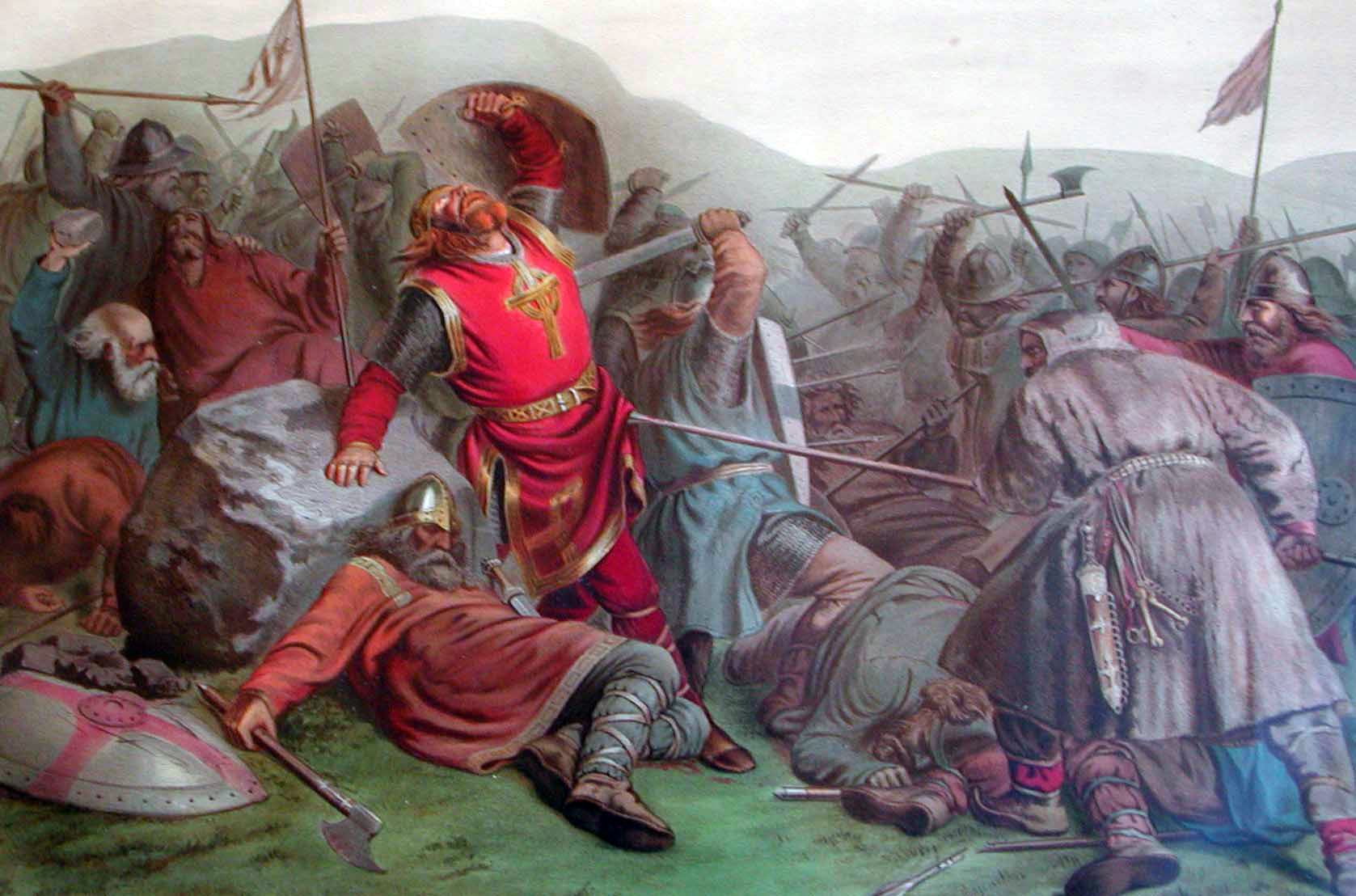
Olav den Helliges fall på Stiklestad Peter Nicolai Arbo (1859)

Torstein Knarresmed (c. 981–1030) was a shipwright from Rovde in Sunnmøre in the present-day county of Møre og Romsdal, Norway. He played an important role in the Battle of Stiklestad. His actions probably saved the life of Thorir Hund during the battle leading to a victory over King Olaf II of Norway.

== Biography ==
Torstein Knarresmed was one of Thorir Hund's most trusted men. Thorir Hund was among the chiefs rallying against the return of King Olaf, who was seeking to reclaim the throne he had previously lost in the Battle of the Helgeå. Torstein had personal reasons for opposing King Olaf, and went first into the battle under his own Sunnmøre banner.

During the Battle of Stiklestad, King Olaf almost killed Thorir Hund with a war hammer. However, Torstein Knarresmed managed to get between them and gave Olaf a wound right above his left knee. Shortly later Thorir Hund thrust his spear into the king's stomach before Kalv Arnesson struck the king in the throat with his sword. Torstein Knarresmed was subsequently killed by a blow in the back but was revenged later that same day by one of Thorir's men.

== Etymology ==
Knarresmed, from the old Norse words knarr and smed (smith), means "shipwright". Torstein Knarresmed was in his lifetime known for his highly seaworthy ships built at his boatyard in a bay near Knarrdal in Rovde.

== See also ==
- Christianization of Scandinavia

== Note ==
- This article includes a translation of its equivalent from the Norwegian (Norsk bokmål) Wikipedia.Torstein Knarresmed

== Primary Source ==
The primary source of information regarding Torstein Knarresmed is contained in Olav den helliges saga from Snorre Sturluson: Heimskringla Kongesagaer)

== Related reading ==
- Petersen, Siegwart (1863) Fortællinger af fædrelandets historie: folkelæsning (Kristiania: J.W. Cappelen)
- Krag, Claus (1995) Aschehougs Norgeshistorie. Vikingtid og riksamling 800-1130 (Oslo: Aschehoug)
