= Kálfr Árnason =

Norwegian chieftain (c. 990 – 1051)

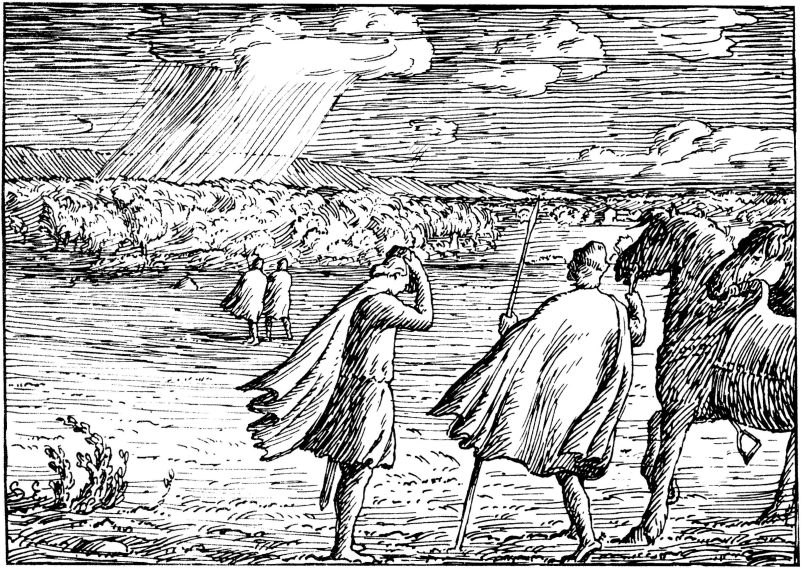
Kálfr Árnason with the young Magnus at Stiklestad; illustration by Halfdan Egedius for the Saga of Magnus the Good in Heimskringla

Kálfr Árnason (Norwegian: Kalv Arnesson; c. 990 – 1051) was an 11th-century Norwegian chieftain who played a major role both in defeating King Olaf Haraldsson (later named St. Olaf) at the Battle of Stiklestad and in bringing back his young son Magnus and raising him to the throne.

== Life ==
Kálfr was a son of Árni Arnmódsson or Armódsson and Þora Þorsteinsdóttir. Finn Árnasson (died c. 1065) and Þorbergr Árnasson (died c. 1050) were his brothers.

In the 1020s and 1030s, he was one of the most powerful chieftains in Norway. He was married to Sigrid Þorisdóttir, sister of Thorir Hund, and his sister Ragnhild was married to Hárek of Tjøtta. According to the earlier, summary histories of Norway such as the Ágrip, he opposed King Olaf as early as the Battle at Nesjar in 1016; in contrast, Snorri Sturluson's Heimskringla depicts him as an early ally of the king, who according to Snorri bestowed on Kálfr both his lands in the Trøndelag and his wife Sigrid after killing the heathen Olvir of Egge, to whom Sigrid had previously been married. According to the one contemporary source which mentions Kálfr, the Kálfsflokkr, by the Icelandic skáld Bjarni gullbrárskáld, he was at Olaf's side in the battle against Erling Skjalgsson. After the latter's death, Olaf was forced to flee Norway in 1028, and Kálfr supposedly went to England and pledged his support to Cnut the Great of Denmark, who became king of Norway that year.

When Olaf returned in 1030 to attempt to regain his kingdom, according to the skaldic poem, Kálfr was one of his strongest opponents. According to the sagas, however, his brothers remained loyal to Olaf. Scholar Claus Krag sees echoes of Judas kissing Jesus in the scenes in Heimskringla between Kálfr and Olaf. At the Battle of Stiklestad, he, Thorir Hund and Hárek of Tjøtta led the farmer army which defeated Olaf, and Heimskringla depicts either him or his kinsman Kálfr Árnfinsson as giving the former king one of his three fatal wounds, a neck wound; however, the poet merely describes him as "[fighting] ... stout of heart ... until that fallen lay the liege-lord", and according to another skáld, Sigvatr Þórðarson, Thorir Hund struck the fatal blow.

Cnut had installed his son Svein as his regent in Norway, together with Svein's mother Ælfgifu, known in Norway as Álfífa. They rapidly became unpopular, and it is likely that Kálfr and other chieftains who had supported Cnut had expected more in return. In about 1034, he and Einar Thambarskelfir, another former supporter of Cnut, went to Garðaríki (now Ukraine) and brought back Olaf's then 11-year-old illegitimate son, Magnus, who was installed in 1035 as king and later became known as Magnus the Good.

Kálfr was initially the most influential advisor of the young king, but later fell into disrepute with him, probably because of Einar's ambition to be his most powerful advisor; according to Heimskringla, at Einar's urging Magnus forced Kálfr to incriminate himself in his father's death by showing him exactly where he had been killed. He spent a number of years abroad, in Ireland and the Hebrides. In 1050, Magnus' successor, Harald Hardrada, asked him to return, but only to send him to fight in Denmark, leading to his death in about 1051. His brother Finn regarded the king as having treated Kálfr deceitfully and broke with him over it.
