= Thorir Hund =

Norwegian historical chieftain

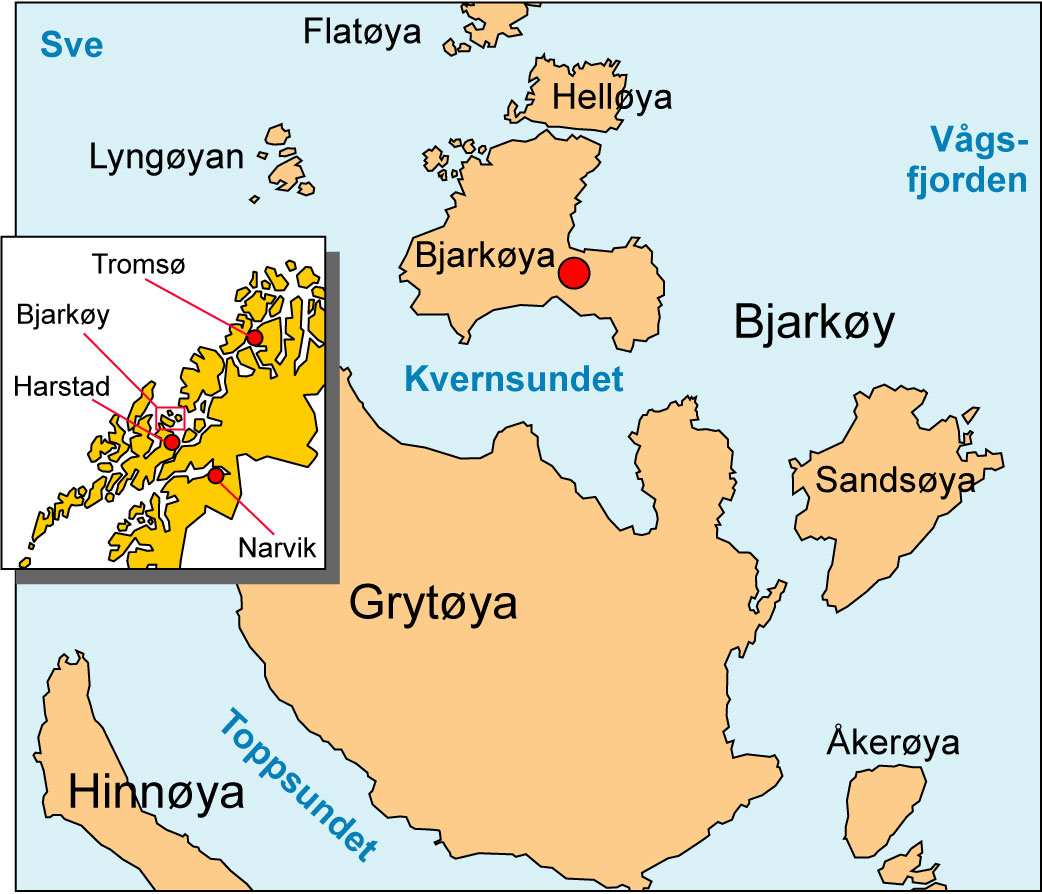
Map of Bjarkøy with the placement of Tore Hund's farm

Thorir Hund (Old Norse: Þórir hundr, Modern Norwegian: Tore Hund; lit. '"Thorir the Hound"') (born ca. 990) was one of the greatest chiefs in Hålogaland. Tore Hund was one of the leaders of the Stiklestad farmer faction opposing Norwegian King Olaf II of Norway, later named St. Olaf. He was reported to have been among the chieftains who killed the king in the Battle of Stiklestad in 1030. He also served in the forces of King Canute the Great on several occasions.

== Background ==
Thorir Hund was born at the beginning of the Christian era in Norway. He was both strongly independent and a devout pagan. Christianization of the country was not only a question of faith. Christianity was also a powerful political tool to subject the old chiefs and in the case of Hålogaland to establish rule by a king from the south.

Thorir was an influential man in the area of Hålogaland, his home being the island of Bjarkøya in Troms. He belonged to the upper echelon among the Norwegian coastal chiefs. He was a member of the Bjarkøy clan, one of the more powerful families in Northern Norway during the Viking Age. He was an accomplished viking, leading several expeditions towards Russia and the White Sea. He traded in Bjarmaland, today the area of Arkhangelsk in northern Russia.

The family of Thorir Hund formed alliances with the most powerful chiefs in Norway. His sister Sigrid Toresdatter was married to Olve Grjotgardsson of Egge. His brother, Sigurd Toresson was also an important chief in Trondenes. He was married to Sigrid Skjalgsdatter, a sister of the powerful nobleman Erling Skjalgsson of Sola in Rogaland. Thorir Hund was married to a woman named Ranveig, about whose background little is known. They had a son called Sigurd Toresson, who later served as a sheriff during the reign of Harald Hardrada.

== Career ==
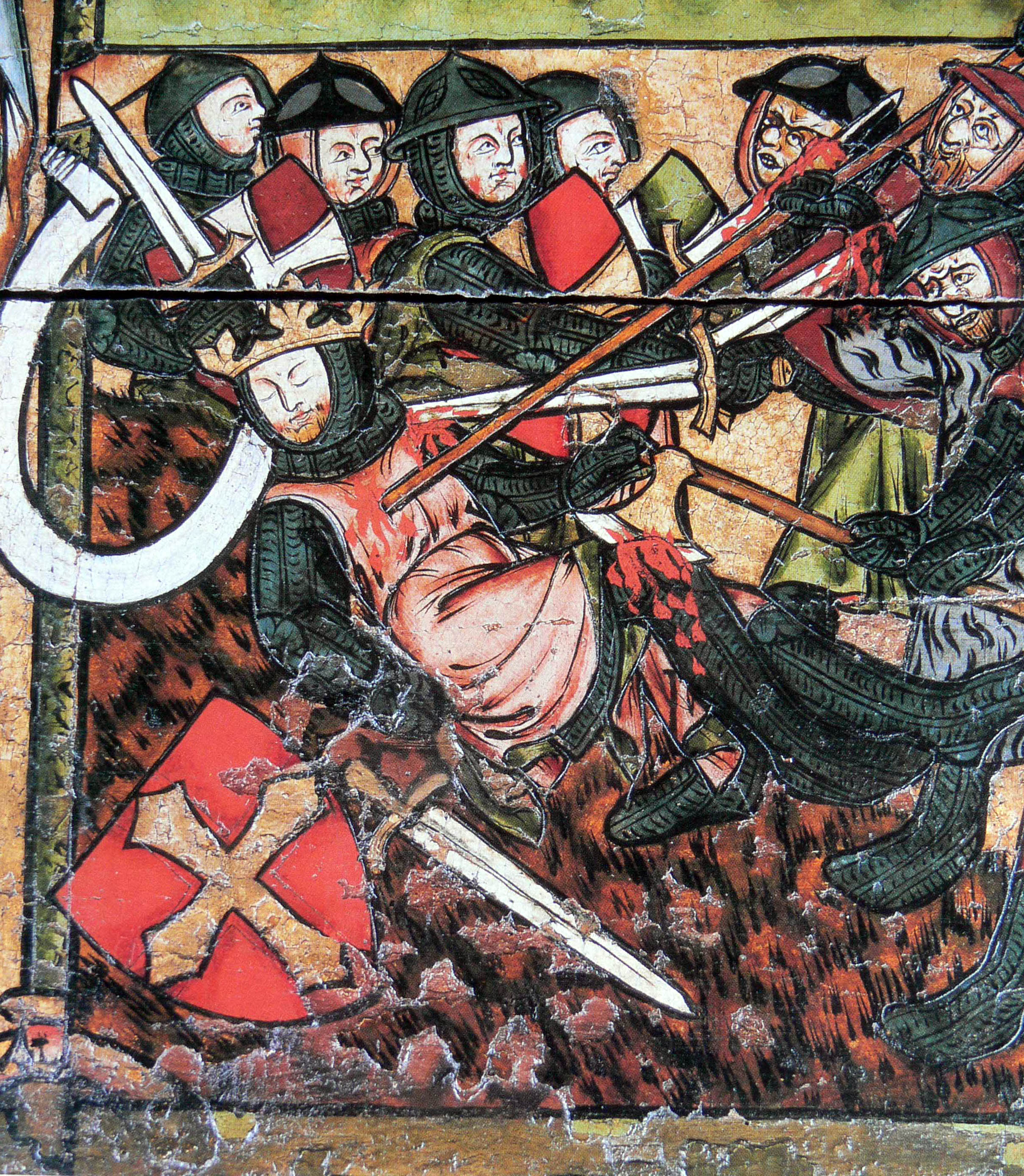
King Olaf's fall

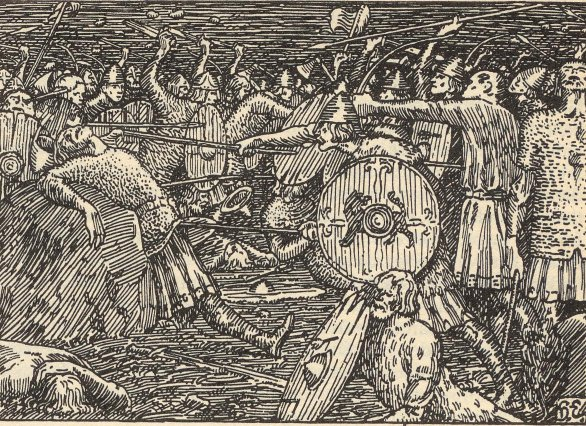
Thorir kills King Olaf, illustration by Halfdan Egedius, 1899

Thorir opposed King Olaf's attempts to unify and Christianize Norway. He also held personal grudges against the king, after one of the king's reeves, Asmundr Grànkelsson, murdered his nephew Asbjørn Selsbane. Thorir later avenged his nephew, but was sentenced to pay a heavy fine by the king, further contributing to his grudge against the king.

When Erling Skjalgsson was killed in 1028, Tore assumed leadership of the anti-Olaf faction together with Einar Thambarskelfir and Kalv Arnesson, the brother of Finn Arnesson. In 1026, he joined Canute's forces when they drove out Olaf and was named Canute's representative in Norway along with Hårek of Tjøtta.

According to Snorri Sturluson's Heimskringla, when Olaf returned to Norway in the summer of 1030, Thorir was among those rallying against him. He and his men led the line against the king's army at the Battle of Stiklestad. The battle site was Stiklestad, a farm in the lower part of the valley of Verdal, 80 kilometres (50 mi) north of the city of Trondheim. According to saga sources, Thorir was among those who gave Olaf his lethal wounds, together with Kalv Arnesson and Thorstein Knarresmed from Rovde in Sunnmøre. While earlier reports do not name the man who actually killed the king, the Heimskringla specifies Thorir, using a spear tipped with the javelin point that killed his nephew to thrust up below the king's mail shirt and into his abdomen.

After the battle, turning political tides soon went against Thorir. As Olaf's son Magnus, backed by some of Thorir's former allies, seized power, Thorir became a marginalized figure. According to Snorri, he may have left Norway for the Holy Lands, or he may have died. He never returned to Bjarkøy.

== Legacy ==
The Tore Hund Monument, by Norwegian artist Svein Haavardsholm, was erected in 1980 beside the road to the church on Bjarkøy. The memorial honors both Thorir Hund and the Bjarkøy clan, who had their seat on Bjarkøy.

Tore Hund is a character in the Norwegian TV series Beforeigners.

== Other sources ==
- Fidjestøl, Bjarne. "Legenda om Tore Hund". In Festskrift til Alfred Jakobsen (Trondheim: 1987) (in Norwegian)
- Krag, Claus. Aschehougs Norgeshistorie. Vikingtid og riksamling 800-1130 (Oslo: 1995)
