= Bergljot Håkonsdatter =

Norwegian noblewoman (c.990–1055)

Bergljot Håkonsdatter (b. ca. 990- d. ca 1055) was a Norwegian noble.

Bergljot was the daughter of Haakon Sigurdsson (c. 937–995) Jarl of Lade and de facto ruler of Norway from about 975 until his death in 995. Bergljot was married to Einar Thambarskelfir (ca. 982-d. 1050) in a political marriage. They became the parents of Eindride Einarsson (d.1050). Her husband was one of the most powerful nobles in the country and served as royal advisor during the reign of King Magnus the Good (1035–1047).

In 1046, Magnus made his uncle Harald Hardrada joint monarch of Norway. The following year, Magnus died and Harald became sole King of Norway. Subsequently, Einar began moving against the increasingly unpopular and tyrannical King Harald. When her spouse and son were both assassinated upon orders by king Harald in 1050, Bergljot raised an army. They attacked the royal estate to kill the king as vengeance, but by then he had already fled. King Harald eventually managed to negotiate peace and secured the family's submission for the remainder of his reign.
