= Svein of Norway =

Svein of Norway (also spelled Sveinn, Svend, Swegen, Sven, Swein or Sweyn) may refer to:

- Swein Forkbeard, king of Norway (999/1000 – 1014)
- Sweyn Haakonsson, regent of Norway (1000 – c. 1015)
- Svein Knutsson, king of Norway (1030–1035)
