= Battle of Lyrskov Heath =

1043 Dano-Norwegian victory in Germany

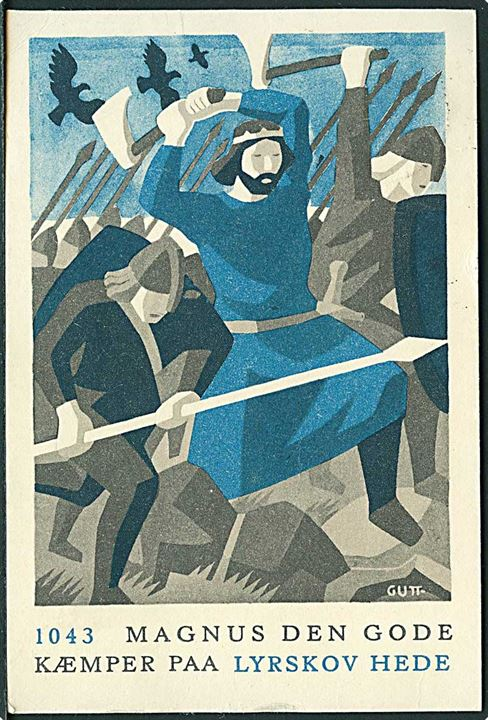
A depiction of Magnus during the Battle of Lyrskov Heath

The Battle of Lyrskov Heath (or Hede) was fought on September 28, 1043, at Lyrskov, between a Dano-Norwegian army led by Magnus the Good and an army of Wends. It was a great victory for Magnus' forces; the Wendish army was crushed and up to 15,000 were killed.

Lyrskov (German: Lürschau) is today the name of a German municipality in the Schleswig-Flensburg district, and of a small town northwest of Schleswig in the same municipality.

== Battle ==
In 1043, a large Wendish army invaded from the south in Southern Jutland and devastated the land as far as Ribe. The size is unknown, but sources say that there were 60 Wends for every Dane, a very large army. Palle Lauring has argued that this was in fact a migration of Wends who wanted to settle in Jutland. According to the chroniclers, King Magnus was on his way home from Wendland where he had destroyed the Viking fort Jomsborg, possibly to destroy the Danish competitors to the throne, and they also plundered the Wendish town of Jumne (the contemporary Wolin). Shortly before, Danes had killed the Wendish prince Ratibor and his sons. So the conflict between Wends and Vikings had been going on for a long time. Arriving in Schleswig again, Magnus heard about a large Wendish army on its way up Jutland.

According to Heimskringla's story about 1230, Magnus got into battle when he saw his father, King Saint Olav, in dreams the night before the battle, and heard him say, "I will follow you in this battle." At dawn the men heard the bell ringing; and those of King Magnus' men who had been in Nidaros thought they recognized the church bell Glad, which Olav the Holy had donated to Clement's Church in Nidaros (and where he was buried at this time).

At Lyrskov Hede, 5-6 km northwest of the then Hedeby where the city of Schleswig is today, the Danish-Norwegian army under the leadership of King Magnus was waiting for them, ready for battle. The battle at Lyrskov Hede was short, and about 15,000 Wends are believed to have lost their lives.

According to Snorre, the army of the Wends came "from the south across the river". King Magnus threw off his chain mail. With a red silk shirt on the outside, he grabbed the ax Hel, which his father had used. The Norwegian monk Theodoricus Monachus wrote in his Norwegian history from the end of the 12th century that King Olav's ax Hel was destroyed during the battle of Lyrskov Heath, and then kept in Nidaros Cathedral.

In Saxo Grammaticus' Chronicle it says that Magnus was nicknamed "the Good" because he killed so many Wends in the battle.

== Coinage after the battle ==
The first coins with Saint Olav as a motif are Danish and minted in Hedeby, probably right after the battle in 1043. These are silver coins, typical of the first half of the 1000s. The coin master is Olav's son Magnus. The mint signature IOLI is known from coins with other motifs. (In Norway, a coin with Saint Olav was minted much later, a gold guilder from Bergen in King Hans's name, probably after 1497.) In the 1000s, a new figure entered European ideology: the Saint King. From then on, holy kings form a new category in the world of saints, such as Edward the Confessor and Knud the Holy. The depiction of Olav the Holy on the coins from Hedeby is probably the oldest depiction of a saint king in Europe.

The coin issue could make the battle of Lyrskov Heath reminiscent of a parallel to the battle of Ponte Milvio, where Constantine the Great defeated Maxentius in 312, as both King Magnus and Emperor Constantine were said to have had dream visions the night before the respective battles. On coins from the 1000s, the ruler is depicted either with a bust, from the front, in profile or sitting on his throne. Standing figures are Christ himself, angels, saints or persons attached to the narrative of Christianity. A standing man with an ax in his left hand can be no other than Saint Olav. Saints are associated with what made them martyrs; and when Olav was hit by an ax by Torstein Knarresmed before his death at Stiklestad, the ax became his symbol. Another, contemporary coin from Hedeby shows a bust of Olav, with the ax in his left hand and a cross in his right. At the time, the penninge was the only valid coin in Norway (about 600 genuine coins have been preserved, and 1800 counterfeits have been found in Bergen), so the motif with Olav was an effective way of conveying his status as a saint to the population.

== Memory of the battle ==
Niels Skovgaard's Magnus Stone was erected in 1898 in Skibelund Krat in memory of Magnus the Good and the battle of Lyrskov Heath.
