= Finn Árnasson =

Norwegian nobleman (died c. 1065)

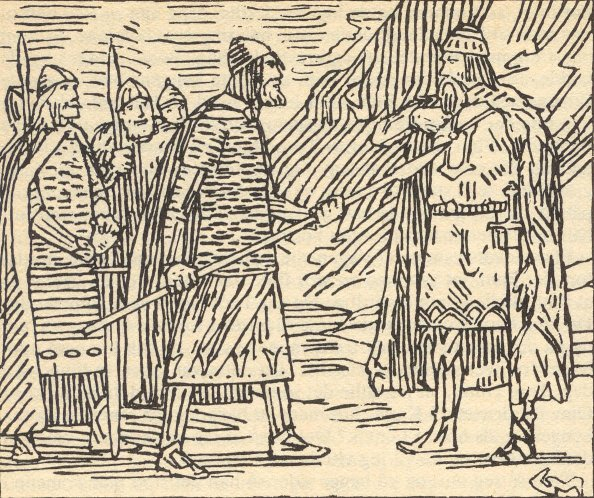
Finn Arnesson confronting Thorir Hund, illustration by Gerhard Munthe

Finn Árnason (Norwegian: Finn Arnesson; died c. 1065) was a Norwegian nobleman and advisor to both King Olaf Haraldsson (later named Saint Olaf) and King Harald III of Norway and later served King Sweyn II of Denmark. He was the feudal lord (lendmann) of Austrått.

== Biography ==
Finn was one of the eight children, seven brothers and a sister, of Árni Arnmódsson or Armódsson, a lendmann, and his wife Þora Þorsteinsdóttir (daughter of Thorstein Gallows). Finn was married to King Harald's niece Bergljót Halvdansdóttir, the daughter of Halfdan Sigurðsson (Halfdan Hadafylke) and sister of Sigurðr Sýr.

The main source for Finn's life is Snorri Sturluson's Heimskringla. Finn and his brothers Kálfr Árnason, Árni Árnason and Þorbergr Árnason all appear in the sagas. Snorri rendered an episode where Finn insists on King Olaf's behalf that Thorir Hund provide remedy for the murder of Karli, one of the king's courtiers. Kálfr governed Trøndelag under Olaf Haraldsson.

In 1028, Finn and his brothers Árni and Þorbergr together with Rögnvald Brusason accompanied Olaf Haraldsson into exile in Kievan Rus. They returned with him, fighting at the Battle of Stiklestad in 1030, where Olaf was killed. Kálfr Árnason was one of the leaders of the opposing army.

Under King Harald, Finn held the manor and lands of Austrått on the Ørlandet peninsula in Trøndelag. In 1051, his brother Kálfr was killed in battle serving King Harald on the island of Funen. Finn believed King Harald had sent Kálfr to his death on purpose and turned against the king. He left for Denmark to serve King Sweyn, who made him a jarl and appointed him to rule Halland.

In 1062, Finn fought in the Battle of Niså off the coast of Halland between King Sweyn and King Harald. King Harald was victorious; King Sweyn escaped, but Finn, who refused to flee, was captured. King Harald spared his life and set him free in Halland.

== Children ==
Finn's daughter Ingibjörg Finnsdóttir married Thorfinn the Mighty, Earl of Orkney, and Malcolm III of Scotland, King of Scots. Another daughter, Sigrið Finnsdóttir, married the earl Ormr Eilifsson, grandson of Haakon Sigurdsson through his daughter Ragnhild.
