= Bjørn Stallare =

Bjørn Stallare (died July 1030) also known as Björn enn digri (Björn the large), was an 11th-century Norwegian diplomat and civil servant during the reign of King Olaf II of Norway.

Bjørn Stallare was involved in the negotiations in behalf of King Olaf, for his marriage to Ingegerd Olofsdotter, the daughter of King Olof Skötkonung of Sweden. In 1018, King Olof's cousin, Ragnvald Ulfsson, the earl of Västergötland, and the King Olaf's emissaries Björn Stallare and Hjalti Skeggiason arrived at the thing of Uppsala in an attempt to sway the Swedish king to accept peace and as a warrant marry his daughter Ingegerd Olofsdotter to the king of Norway. However, King Olof would not allow the marriage of his daughter to occur. Ingegerd later became the consort of Yaroslav I the Wise of Kiev.

King Olaf of Norway and King Olof Skötkonung later agreed to a peace treaty at Kungahälla ca 1020. King Olof was forced to accept a settlement with King Olaf, who already had been married with King Olof's daughter, Astrid Olofsdotter, through the efforts of Ragnvald Ulfsson. Ragnvald had delivered Astrid at Sarpsborg in Norway and she married King Olaf after Christmas of 1019.

Bjørn Stallare was long one of King Olaf's closest adviser. However, in 1026 King Olaf lost the Battle of the Helgeå, and the Norwegian nobles rallied round the invading King Cnut the Great of Denmark, forcing King Olaf to flee the country. Björn subsequently entered into an alliance with the King Canute. Later Björn was reconciled with King Olaf. Reportedly Björn supported King Olaf's return to Norway and is believed to have died with him in 1030 at the Battle of Stiklestad (slaget på Stiklestad).

During the World War II, Arne Skouen adopted Bjørn Stallare as a pseudonym writing about occupied Oslo.

== Sources ==
King Olaf's betrothal to Ingegerd is described in both Fagrskinna and in Heimskringla.
