= Dag Ringsson =

Dag Ringsson was a Norwegian chieftain from Oppland who participated in the Battle of Stiklestad during 1030 which resulted in the death of King Olaf II of Norway

According to Snorri Sturluson, Dag Ringsson was a descendant of Harald Fairhair. His family had settled in Sweden, where Dag was a nobleman at the service of Swedish King Anund Jacob.

According to the Saga of Saint Olaf as recorded by Snorri Sturluson in the Heimskringla, Dag Ringsson was a member of King Olaf's army at the Battle of Stiklestad (Slaget på Stiklestad) in 1030. After King Olaf had fallen at Stiklestad, Dag led his forces into battle (Dagsriden). However, the peasant army soon overwhelmed the remnants of the king's men. Dag and his followers fled back to Sweden. Mention of Dag Ringsson did not appear after this point.
