= Haakon Ericsson =

Earl of Lade and governor of Norway

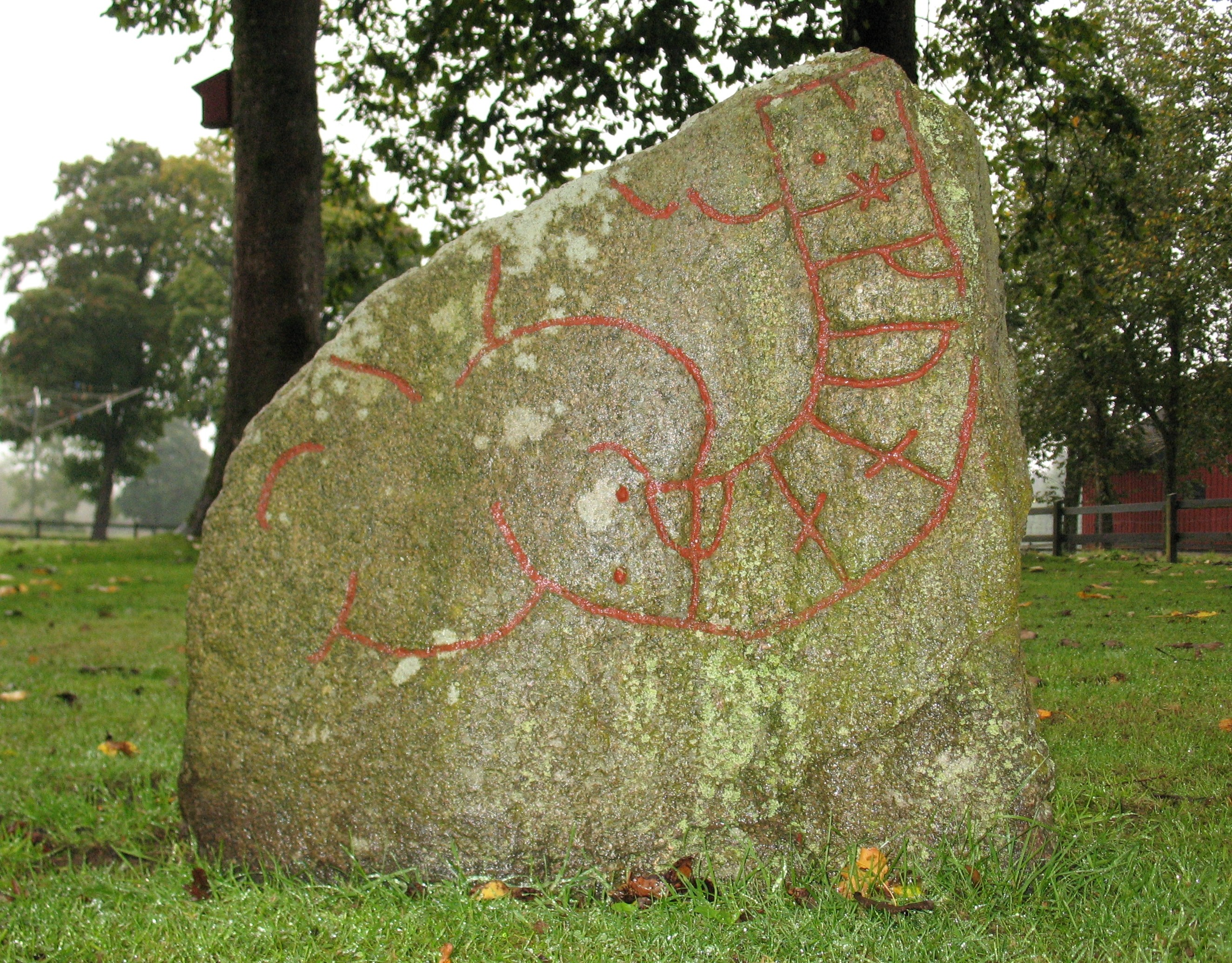
Håkon Eiriksson was probably the Håkon Jarl who is mentioned on the Komstad Runestone.

Haakon Ericsson or Haakon Eriksson (Old Norse: Hákon Eiríksson; Norwegian: Håkon Eiriksson; (998-1030) was the last Earl of Lade and governor of Norway from 1012 to 1015 and again from 1028 to 1029 as a vassal under Danish King Knut the Great.

== Biography ==
Haakon Ericsson was born in 998, the son of Eirik Håkonson and Gytha, a daughter of Swein Forkbeard, king of Denmark and briefly of England. Haakon came from a dynasty of Norwegian rulers in the eastern part of Trondheim, bordering the Trondheimsfjord. Eirik Håkonson was ruler of Norway and earl of Northumbria. After the Battle of Svolder, Eirik Håkonson, with his brother Sveinn Hákonarson, became kings of Norway under Sweyn Forkbeard. In 1014 or 1015 Eirik Håkonson left Norway and joined Knut for his campaign in England. The north English earldom of Northumbria was given by Knut to Eirik after he won control of the north. Eirik remained as earl of Northumbria until his death between 1023 and 1033.

As his father's successor in Norway, Håkon Eiriksson ruled as a Danish vassal from 1012 to 1015, with Einar Tambarskjelve as his aide and his uncle, Sveinn Hákonarson, holding some areas as a Swedish vassal. After some years' absence in England fighting the Danes, Olaf Haraldsson returned to Norway in 1015 and declared himself king, obtaining the support of the petty kings of the Uplands. In 1016, Olaf defeated Sveinn Hákonarson at the Battle of Nesjar. After the victory of Olaf Haraldsson, Håkon fled to England where he was well received by King Knut and made Earl of Worcester. After the Battle of the Helgeå, Norwegian nobles rallied behind Knut.

He is recorded as being the ruler of the Sudreyar from 1016 until 1030. In 1028, Håkon Eiriksson returned as Knut's vassal ruler of Norway.

Håkon died in a shipwreck in the Pentland Firth, between the Orkney Islands and the Scottish mainland, in either late 1029 or early 1030.

== Notes ==
Hákon Eiríksson House of Hlaðir Died: 1029 or 1030
Political offices
| Preceded by Eiríkr Hákonarson | Jarl of Hlaðir; 995–1023 | Title ended |
Regnal titles
| Preceded by Eiríkr Hákonarson & Sveinn Hákonarson | Regent of Norway; 1012–1015 with Sveinn Hákonarson | Succeeded by Olaf the Saint as King of Norway |
| Preceded by Olaf the Saint as King of Norway | Regent of Norway; 1028–1029 with Canute the Great | Succeeded by Svein Knutsson & Canute the Great |
