= Battle of Stiklestad =

1030 battle in Trøndelag, Norway

Coordinates: 63°47′48″N 11°34′00″E

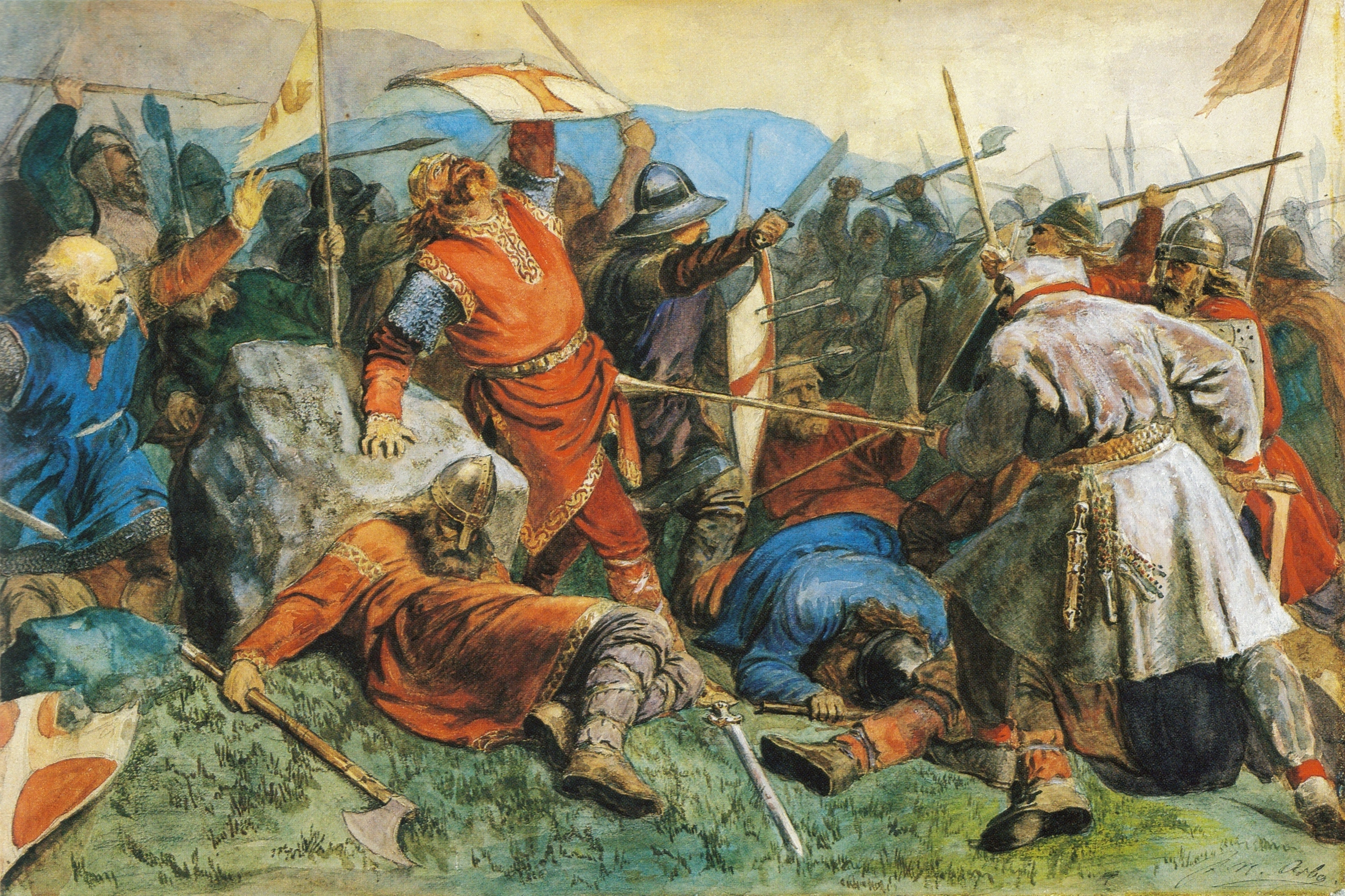
- The Death of Olaf II at the Battle of Stiklestad; Peter Nicolai Arbo, c. 1859
Date	29 July 1030 (trad.)
Location	Stiklestad, Norway
Result	Farmer Army victory

Belligerents
Olaf Haraldsson's hird and allies Swedish auxiliaries	The "Farmer Army" composed of Rival jarls, chieftains, villagers and others loyal to Cnut the Great.

Commanders and leaders
Olaf II of Norway †; Dagr Hringsson; Harald Hardrada (WIA)	Þórir hundr Kálfr Árnason; Hárek of Tjøtta

Strength
c. 6,600	c. 14,400

Casualties and losses
c. 4,200	c. 4,600

The Battle of Stiklestad (Norwegian: Slaget på Stiklestad; Old Norse: Stiklastaðaorrusta) in 1030 is one of the most famous battles in the history of Norway. In this battle, King Olaf II of Norway was killed. During the pontificate of Pope Alexander III, the Roman Catholic Church declared Olaf a saint in 1164.

His younger half-brother, Harald Hardrada, was also present at the battle. Harald was only fifteen when the battle of Stiklestad took place. He became King of Norway in 1047, until his death in a failed invasion of England at the Battle of Stamford Bridge in 1066.

== Background ==
During the 9th century, Norway was divided among several local kings controlling their own fiefs. By the end of the century, King Harald Fairhair managed, mainly due to the military superiority gained by his marriage alliance with Hákon Grjótgarðsson of Nidaros, to subjugate these mini–kingdoms, and he created a unified Norwegian state.

This alliance came apart after Harald's death. The jarls of Lade and various descendants of Harald Fairhair would spend the next century interlocked in feuds over power. As well as power politics, religion also played a part in these conflicts, as two of the descendants of Harald Fairhair, Haakon the Good and Olaf Tryggvason attempted to convert the then heathen Norwegians to Christianity. In the year 1000, Sveinn Hákonarson and Eiríkr Hákonarson of Lade took control over Norway, being supported by the Danish King Sweyn Forkbeard. In 1015, Olaf Haraldsson, representing the descendants of Harald Fairhair, returned from one of his Viking trips and was immediately elected as King of Norway. In June 1016, he won the Battle of Nesjar against the jarls of Lade.

Olav Haraldsson's success in becoming King of Norway was helped by the Danes being kept occupied with the ongoing fighting in England. In the year 1028, the Danish king Cnut the Great made an alliance with the Lades, and Olaf had to go into exile in Kievan Rus'. In the year of 1029 the last Lade jarl, Haakon Ericsson, drowned, and Olaf prepared a military expedition to reclaim the throne. Olaf was supported by the Swedish king Anund Jacob who wanted to weaken Cnut's power and provided Olaf with 400 men and guides that could lead Olaf through Dalarna into Norway. Dagr Hringsson, a Norwegian noble in exile in Sweden and governor for Anund Jacob also joined forces with Olaf on the condition that his old lands would be restored to him. On route, Olaf also recruited several highwaymen before mustering for forces in Jämtland.

== Battle ==
According to saga sources, Olaf traveled with his 3,600 man army through Sweden and crossed the mountains into the valley of Verdalen, about 80 kilometres (50 mi) north of the city of Trondheim. Olaf and his men arrived at Stiklestad, a farm in the lower part of the valley. This was where the Battle of Stiklestad took place, as described by Snorri Sturluson in his famous work Heimskringla, written about 200 years later.

At Stiklestad, Olaf met an army led by Hárek of Tjøtta, Thorir Hund from Bjarkøy and Kálfr Árnason, a man who previously served Olaf. The farmer army consisted of one hundred hundred according to Snorri, which in long hundreds means 14,400, and not 10,000. He states that the battle cry of Olaf's men was Fram, fram, kristsmenn, krossmenn, konungsmenn! (Forward! Forward! Men of Christ, men of the cross, men of the king!), while that of the opposing army was Fram, fram, búandmenn! (Forward! Forward! Farmers!). Olaf's brother Harald was according to some sources instructed to remain in the camp, but convinced his older brother to let him fight.

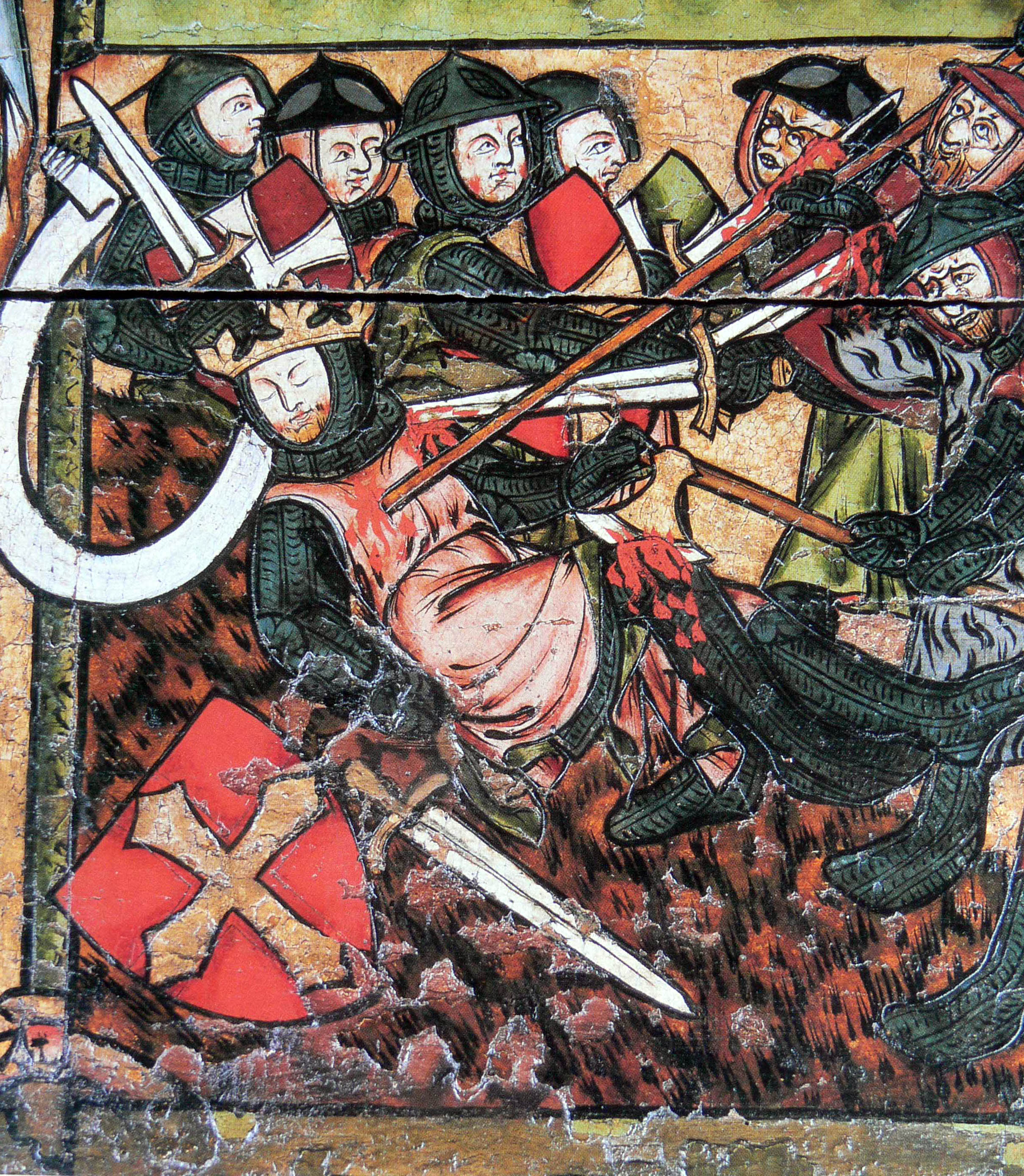
King Olaf's fall

According to Snorri, Olaf received three severe wounds – in the knee, in the neck, and while leaning against a large stone the final mortal spear thrust up under his mail shirt and into his belly. According to saga sources, Thorir was among those who gave Olaf his lethal wounds, together with Kálfr Árnason and Torstein Knarresmed from Rovde in Sunnmøre. While earlier sources do not specify who dealt the king his blows, Snorri makes Thorir Hund responsible for the latter, using the spear that had killed his nephew and set the fallout between the king and Thorir in motion. Bjørn Stallare, the king's marshall, almost killed Thorir with a "axe-hammer" (a type of early warhammer). However, Torstein Knarresmed managed to get between them and gave Olaf a wound right above his left knee. Thorir Hund stabbed Bjørn to death with his spear and shortly later thrust his spear into the king's stomach. Kálfr Árnason then struck the king in the throat with his sword. Torstein Knarresmed was subsequently killed by a blow in the back but was revenged later that same day by one of Thorir's men. Dagr Hringsson continued to fight after the king's death but as the king's flank was scattered Kalv and Thorir set their attention to Dagr, forming a wedge formation which forced Dagr and the remainder of Olaf's army retreat. Harald was wounded in the battle and fled after the king's death, being taken in and hidden by locals on account of his youth and not knowing that he was Olaf's brother. The king's body was carried away and buried secretly in the sandy banks of the Nidelva River south of the city of Trondheim.

== Aftermath ==
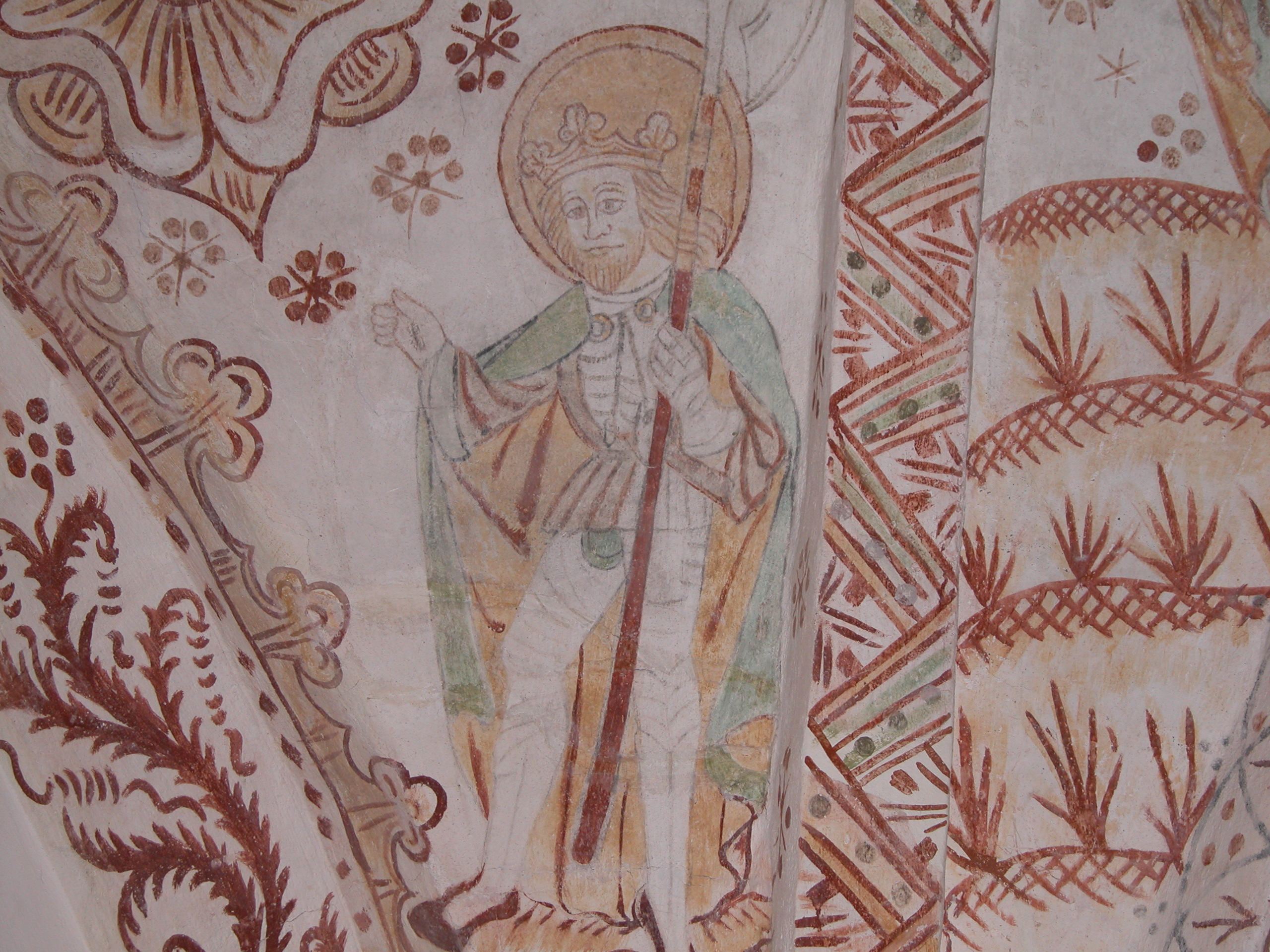
Saint Olaf

The year after the battle, his grave and coffin were opened and according to Snorri the body was incorrupt and the hair and nails had grown since he was buried. The coffin was then moved to St. Clement's Church in Trondheim. Among the bishops that Olaf had brought with him from England, was Grimketel and it was he that initiated the beatification of Olaf on 3 August. Stiklestad Church (Stiklestad kyrkje) was erected on top of the stone against which St Olaf died. The stone is supposedly still inside the altar of the church.

One hundred years later, Nidaros Cathedral was built in Trondheim on the site of his original burial place. Olaf's body was moved to this church and enshrined in a silver reliquary behind the high altar. This reliquary took the form of a miniature church, common to medieval reliquaries containing the entire body of a saint, but was unique in that it is said to have had dragon heads at the apex of the gables similar to those still seen on Norwegian stave churches. In the 16th century, during the Protestant Reformation period, Olaf's body was removed from this reliquary, which was melted down for coinage by order of the Dano-Norwegian king. His remains were reburied somewhere in Nidaros Cathedral – exactly where is still today an unsolved mystery. Queen Josephine of Leuchtenberg of Norway and Sweden, the consort of Oscar I, asked for the one known remaining relic of St. Olaf, an ulna or radius in a medieval reliquary in the Danish National Museum, from King Frederik VII of Denmark, which he gave to her and which she in turn gave to St. Olaf's Cathedral in Oslo in August 1862.

== Evaluation ==
While Snorri's description of the battles in the Heimskringla makes for epic reading, its grandeur most likely must be put down to the writer's taste for the grand.

In Gardarike, Olaf was only surrounded by his most loyal followers. Neither can one expect that recruitment was especially ample in Sweden or through the sparsely populated valleys through which Olaf travelled. Thus, Olaf's army was probably of a rather rag-tag character, an impression accentuated by tales of how local robber groups would join it as Olaf made his way down the Verdalen valley. The recruitment of robber gangs and other scofflaws was likely no surprise to the polytheistic heathens that opposed Olaf's attempts to forcibly convert them by murdering and torturing regional Jarls and Kings to terrorize them into accepting Christianity. Heimskringla reports that Anund Jacob could not raise support of an invasion of Norway among the Swedes and could only provide Olaf with a smaller force made out of his personal soldiers.

In fact, why Olaf chose to travel through the politically hostile Trøndelag, rather than to try to rally his relatives and political allies of Eastern Norway, is to this day an unsolved mystery. Perhaps he was making a last-ditch attempt for Nidaros, hoping to win acceptance for his claim to the throne amongst the farmers of Trøndelag.

On the other hand, the opposition – basically lower nobles and grand farmers under the influence of King Cnut – could not have had much time to assemble a large force. When alerted to Olaf's presence, they must have responded swiftly, considering that they met Olaf relatively far up the valley. Therefore, their action points more toward a small, hastily arranged rally of men rather than the elaborate logistics that would have been needed to assemble a 10,000-man-strong army.

Those who could have mobilized a large-scale army, the local nobles of Trøndelag (of which Einar Thambarskelfir was a prime example) were notable largely by their absence on either side. Also, the battlefield of a hotly contested battle between nearly 20,000 men should have produced rich archeological findings to that effect; at Stiklestad however, these are sparse, though this is common in Norway. The rocky soil is not as well-suited to battlefield archaeology as continental or English soil. It makes georadar readings all but unusable, and the location of the battle site highly uncertain. On Stiklestad, the soil is deep soil with some clay, and georadar was used in 2008, showing traces of large buildings, but not much to indicate a battlefield. As is the case with most battles mentioned in the sagas, the sizes of the battling armies are probably impossible to determine.

Olaf's role in Norwegian history had only just begun at his death. While nobles and rich farmers had expected their position to improve with the removal of the aggressive Olaf, the opposite happened. The rule of Cnut's wife Ælfgifu of Northampton and their son Svein was exceedingly harsh on the people. The church especially – a traditional ally of Olaf – came under greater pressure.

Thus, the late King's martyr status was accentuated, helping to incite common folk into revolting against the hardships enforced by the succeeding Danish rule. Propaganda proclaiming the heroic nature of Olaf's last stand made for great nation-building material in the immature Norwegian state, where the warrior ethic of the Vikings and their gods and goddesses were still highly revered. According to Snorri, even nature lent a hand, as the day of the battle coincided with a nearly-full solar eclipse, as reflected in the description of an ill-fated 'blooded red sun', which was interpreted as a certain omen of bad things to come. However, the solar eclipse took place at about 2:00 p.m. on August 31 that year contrary to the traditional date of the battle on July 29.

Olaf was a rather stubborn and rash ruler. Modern historians generally agree that Olaf was inclined to violence and brutality. Ironically, he became Norway's patron saint. His canonization was performed only a year after his death by the bishop of Nidaros. The cult of Olaf not only unified the country, it also fulfilled the conversion of the nation, something for which the king had fought so hard.

While divisive in life, in death Olaf became – Rex Perpetuus Norvegiae – the eternal king of Norway, wielded a unifying power no foreign monarch could hope to undo. Cnut, most distracted by the task of administering England, managed to rule Norway for five years after the battle through his viceroy son Svein. However, when Olaf's illegitimate son Magnus (dubbed 'the Good') laid claim to the Norwegian throne, Cnut had to yield. Thus, a century of prosperity and expansion followed, lasting until the kingdom again descended into the Civil war era in Norway over the issue of succession.'

== Legacy ==
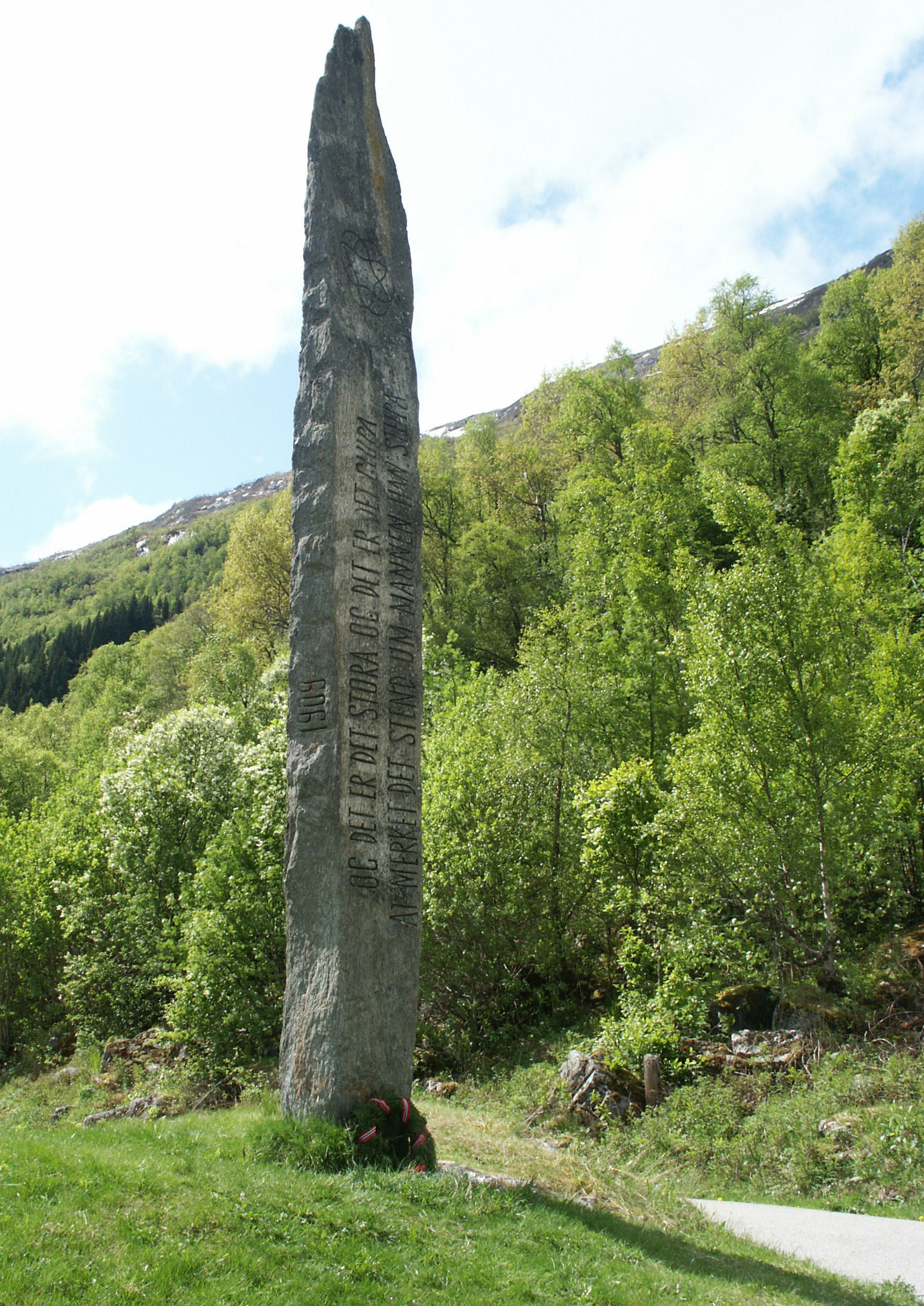
Memorial in Stalheim

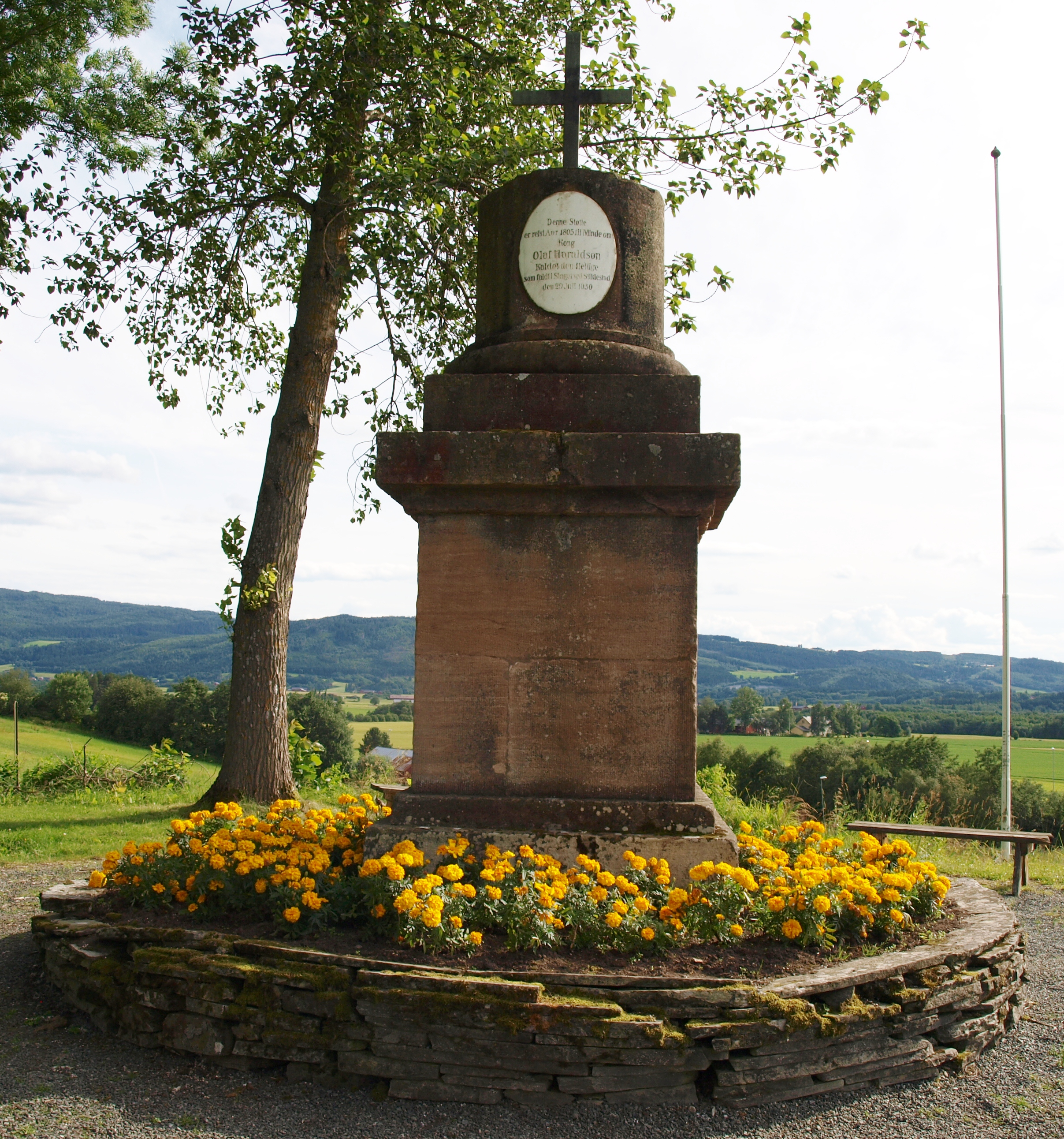
Olavsstøtta at Olavhaugen

Stiklestad National Cultural Center (Stiklestad Nasjonale Kultursenter) at Verdal was established by a parliamentary resolution in 1995. Olavsstøtta is a monument in the Stiklestad National Cultural Center. It was erected in 1807 in memory of the Battle of Stiklestad. The memorial is one of the oldest preserved public monuments in Norway.

In 1901, poet Per Sivle wrote a poem Tord Foleson, about King Olaf's standard-bearer at the battle. Foleson was able to plant the banner before he died, and it remained standing throughout the battle, even after the king fell. It was kept erect and replaced by the local populace for centuries, and a memorial stands at the site today. The most famous line of the poem, Merket det stend, um mannen han stupa ('The symbol stands, even when the man falls'), is inscribed on the memorial in Stalheim, Norway. It is also on the inscription wall in the Bergen-Belsen concentration camp memorial site.

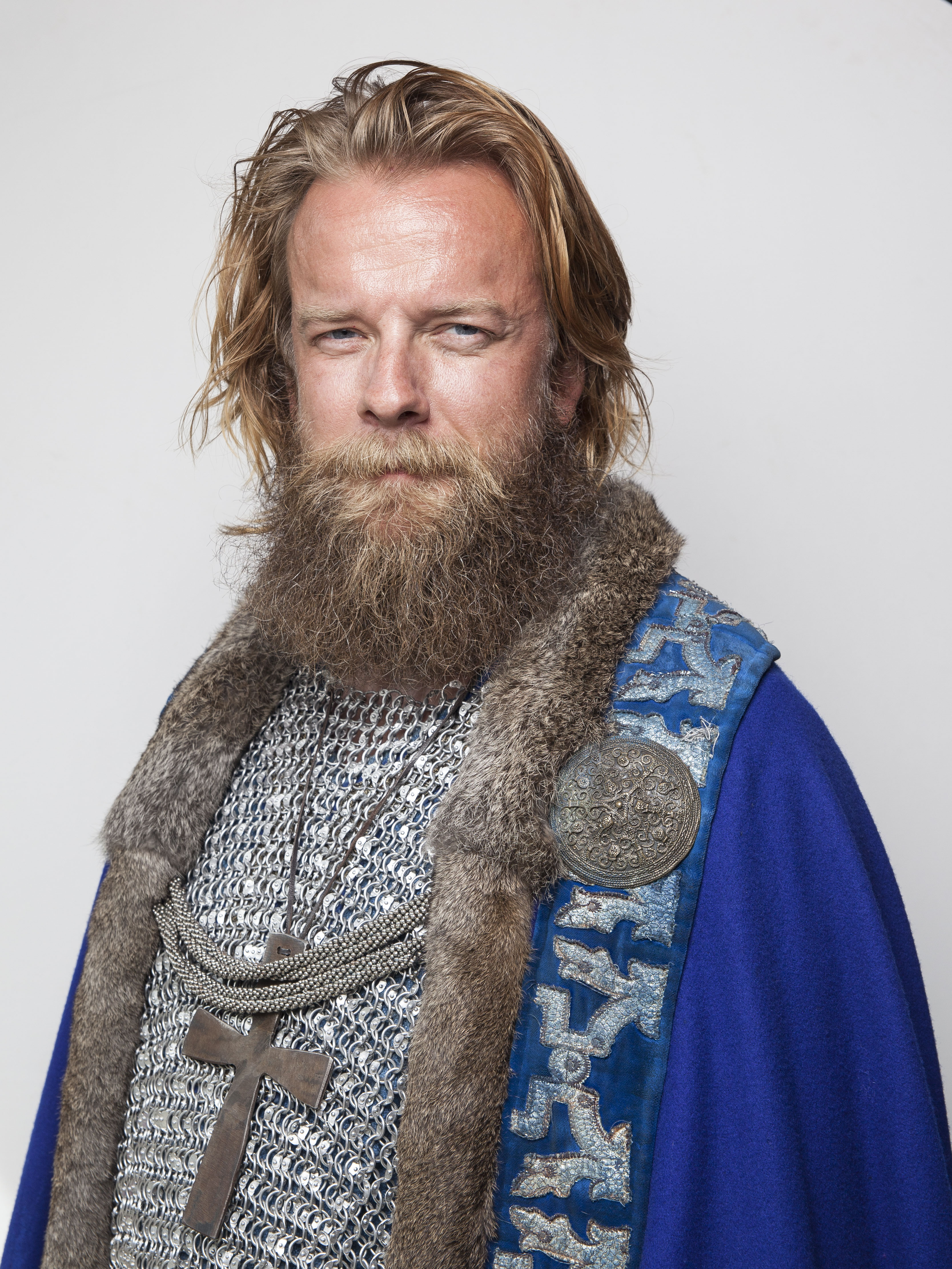
Pål Christian Eggen (above) played King Olaf II of Norway in The Saint Olav Drama in 2014.

The Saint Olav Drama (Spelet om Heilag Olav) is an outdoor theatre performance played every end of July in Stiklestad. In July 1954, the owner of the farm at Stiklestad gave permission for the performance of a play based on the battle on his property. The play was written by Olav Gullvåg and has been staged every year since 1954. Annually, people travel to Stiklestad to watch The Saint Olaf Drama at what is now the largest outdoor theatre in Scandinavia.

== See also ==
- Olavsfestival
- Olavinlinna
- Ólavsøka
- Olsok
- Legendary Saga of St. Olaf
- Separate Saga of St. Olaf

== Other sources ==
- Bagge, Sverre Cross and Scepter (Princeton University Press. 2014) ISBN 978-0691161501
- Bagge, Sverre From Viking Stronghold to Christian Kingdom (Museum Tusculanum Press. 2010) ISBN 978-8763507912
- Henriksen, Vera St Olav of Norway: King, saint and enigma (TANO. 1985) ISBN 978-8251820554
- Myklebus, Morten Olaf Viking & Saint (Norwegian Council for Cultural Affairs, 1997) ISBN 978-82-7876-004-8
- Winroth, Anders The Conversion of Scandinavia (Yale University Press. 2012) ISBN 978-0300205534
