= Erling Skjalgsson =

Norwegian political leader (975–1028)

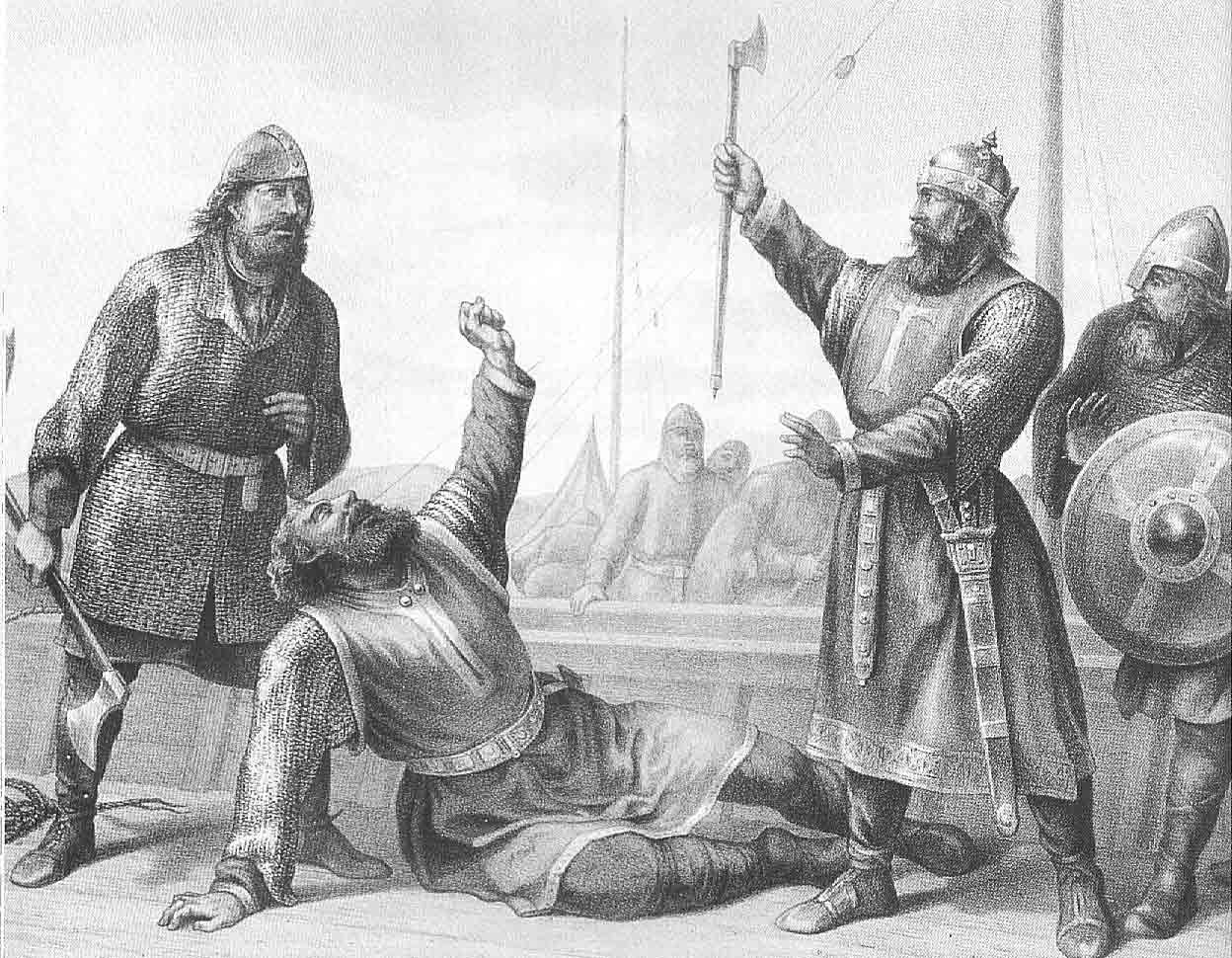
- Death of Erling Skjalgsson; Illustration by Peter Nicolai Arbo
- Born: 975; Sola, Rogaland
- Died: 21 December 1028 (aged 52–53); Boknafjord
- Resting place: Sola, Rogaland
- Occupation: Political leader
- Known for: This period's foremost defender of the historic Norwegian social system

Erling Skjalgsson, på Sola (Sola, Rogaland, 975 – Boknafjorden, 21 December 1028, bur. Sola, Rogaland), "Rygekongen", Herse/Høvding i Rogaland, was a Norwegian political leader of the late 10th and early 11th centuries. He has been commonly seen as this period's foremost defender of the historic Norwegian social system. Erling fought for the traditional small, autonomous kingdoms and the þing system, against the reformists of the Fairhair family line.

== Background ==
According to the Norwegian-Icelandic saga tradition Erling Skjalgsson, son of Torleiv Skjalg Ogmundsson, belonged to one of the most prominent clans in western Norway. He lived on the farm Sola in Nord-Jæren. His sister was married to Sigurd Toresson, an important chief in Trondenes and the brother of Tore Hund of Bjarkøy.

Erling was established as a political front figure by the farmers of Gulaþing. They demanded that he be married to Olav Tryggvason's sister Astrid Tryggvesdatter, daughter of Tryggve Olafsson, king of Viken, and wife Astrid Eiriksdatter. Astrid initially refused but later agreed only after strong pressure from her brother. Erling Skjalgsson was baptized and married to Astrid during the summer of year 996. Erling thus became an important ally during the remaining four years of King Olav's reign. Olav awarded Erling all the land between the Sognefjord and Lindesnes to rule.

== Career ==
After the Battle of Svolder resulted in the defeat of Olav Tryggvason, the victorious leaders split Norway into three areas of control. The three-way rule of Norway during these years suited Erling well. His own power base was strong enough that he could maintain his own autonomy. However in 1015, the relative stability of this arrangement was affected by the arrival of Olav Haraldsson. In 1016 at the Battle of Nesjar, Erling fought against Olav Haraldsson in Svein jarl's losing forces. Afterward Olav Haraldsson was forced to form an uneasy alliance with Erling Skjalgsson. The settlement was arranged with Erling having to accept lesser terms than had been granted him by either Olav Tryggvason or Svein jarl.

However, Erling kept enforcing his power on the western coast of Norway from Rogaland extending further north, presumably to Sogn. King Olav tried to split his powers by introducing new local nobles, but these were quickly pushed out by Erling's traditional clout. In 1022, the king arrested Erling's nephew (his sister's son), Asbjørn Selsbane, for murder. Erling replied by raising a 1,000-man army and circling the king at Avaldsnes. King Olav gave in and released the nephew. However this episode damaged the relationship between the two men. During 1027, Erling traveled to England to seek the support of Canute the Great.

Erling returned during autumn in 1028 and rallied an army with the intention to fight Olav. However as his army was shipborne, Erling was trapped on a single ship by King Olav's fleet in the Battle of Boknafjorden near Bokn in Rogaland. The ship was overwhelmed, Erling was captured and his ship was cleared. Just as Olav was set to pardon him, Erling himself was killed by Aslak Fitjaskalle, from Fitjar in Sunnhordland, who cleaved Erling's head with an axe.

According to Heimskringla, King Olav said to the killer, You fool! Now you hewed Norway off my hands!. The king's prediction turned true. Backed by Canute the Great, Erling's allies went on to drive Olav out of the country, and then finally kill him at the Battle of Stiklestad in 1030.

== Personal life ==
Erling and Astrid were the parents of several children:

- Ragnhild Erlingsdatter (992), married to Torberg Arnesson of Giske (ca. 1000–1050), brother of Finn Arnesson and Kalv Arnesson, son of Arne Arnmodsson and wife Tora Thorsteinsdatter, paternal grandson of Arnmod Arnvidsson, Jarl, and maternal grandson of Thorstein Galge, and mother of Tora Torbergsdatter, second wife of King Harald Hardråde and mother of both King Olav Kyrre and King Magnus II Haraldsson.
- Aslak Erlingsson (997)
- Skjalg Erlingsson (999)
- Sigurd Erlingsson (1001)
- Lodin Erlingsson (1003)
- Tore Erlingsson (1003)
- Gertrud Erlingsdatter (1006)

== Legacy ==
In the area of the Sola Church Ruins there is a monument of Erling Skjalgsson, who was one of Sola's most famous men. This notable Viking leader has been credited with having introduced Christianity to Sola. The stone crosses at Tjora are also monuments to the passing of the Viking Age. The stone cross in Stavanger raised to him is the oldest preserved monument to a Norwegian leader. It is used in the Coat of arms of the region Rogaland.

Erling Skjalgssons gate at Frogner in Oslo was named in his honour as were streets in Trondheim, Stavanger, Haugesund and Sandnes.

Erling is the main character in several novels by Lars Walker, including The Year of the Warrior and West Oversea.
