= Hárek of Tjøtta =

Norwegian chieftain (965–1036)

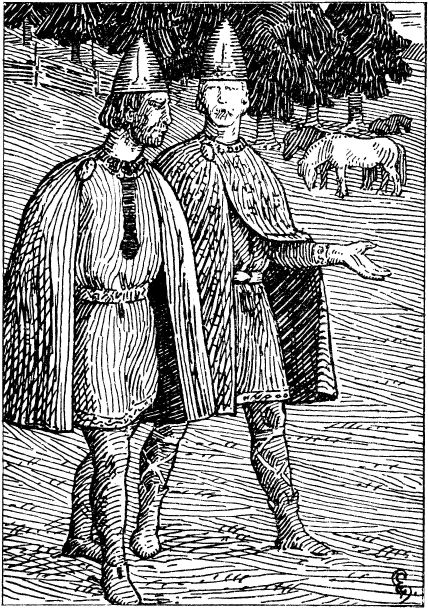
Hárek with Olaf Tryggvason. 1897 drawing by Halfdan Egedius

Hårek of Tjøtta (965 in Tjøtta – 1036) was a Norwegian farmer and local chieftain. He was a son of the skald, Eyvindr skáldaspillir, who ruled from Tjøttagodset (a large manor). Hårek resided at Tjøtta in Nordland (north Norway), and had significant influence in the district of Hålogaland. He participated in the Battle of Stiklestad in 1030, where his farmer army defeated Olaf Haraldsson. Six years later when visiting king Magnus Olavsson I also known as Magnus the Good (the son of Olaf Haraldsson) in Trondheim, he was killed by axe in 1036 by rival chieftain Åsmund Grankjellsson, and thus the former king's son got his revenge.
