= Magnus the Good =

King of Norway (1035–1047) and Denmark (1042–1047)

- Obverse of a coin minted for Magnus the Good in Lund (at the time a town in Danish Scania)

King of Norway
- Reign: 1035 – 25 October 1047
- Predecessor: Cnut
- Successor: Harald III
- Co-ruler: Harald III (1046–47)

King of Denmark
- Reign: 8 June 1042 – 25 October 1047
- Predecessor: Cnut III
- Successor: Sweyn II
- Born: c. 1024; Norway
- Died: 25 October 1047 (aged 23); Zealand, Denmark
- Burial: Nidaros Cathedral, Norway
- Issue: Ragnhild Magnusdatter
Names
- Magnús Óláfsson
- House: St. Olaf (Vestfold branch of Fairhair dynasty)
- Father: Saint Olaf
- Mother: Alfhild

Magnus Olafsson (Old Norse: Magnús Óláfsson; Norwegian and Danish: Magnus Olavsson; c. 1024 – 25 October 1047), better known as Magnus the Good (Old Norse: Magnús góði; Norwegian and Danish: Magnus den gode), was King of Norway from 1035 and King of Denmark from 1042 until his death in 1047.

Magnus was an illegitimate son of Saint Olaf, and fled with his mother Alfhild when his father was dethroned in 1028. He returned to Norway in 1035 and was crowned king at the age of 11. In 1042, he was also crowned king of Denmark. Magnus ruled the two countries until 1047, when he died under unclear circumstances. After his death, his kingdom was split between Harald Hardrada in Norway and Sweyn Estridsson in Denmark.

== Early life ==
Magnus was an illegitimate son of King Olaf Haraldsson (later Saint Olaf) by his English concubine Alfhild, originally a slave (thrall) of Olaf's queen Astrid Olofsdotter. Born prematurely, the child was weak and unable to breathe for the first few minutes, and he was probably not expected to survive. Olaf was not present at the child's birth, and his Icelandic skald Sigvatr Þórðarson became his godfather. In a hasty baptism, Sigvatr named Magnus after the greatest king he knew of, also Olaf's greatest role model, Karla Magnus, or Charlemagne. Against the odds, Magnus went on to grow strong and healthy, and he became of vital importance to Olaf as his only son.

Olaf was dethroned by the Danish king Cnut the Great in 1028, and he went into exile with his family and court, including the young Magnus. They travelled over the mountains and through Eidskog during the winter, entered Värmland, and were given shelter by a chieftain called Sigtrygg in Närke. After a few months, they departed Närke, and by March went eastwards towards Sigtuna, where the Swedish king Anund Jacob had left them a ship. The party thereafter sailed through the Baltic Sea and into the Gulf of Finland, eventually landing in Kievan Rus' (Garðaríki). They made their first stop at Staraya Ladoga (Aldeigjuborg) to organise the further journey. From there they travelled southwards to Novgorod (Holmgard), where Olaf sought assistance from Grand Prince Yaroslav the Wise. Yaroslav, however, did not want to become directly involved in the Scandinavian power-struggles, and declined to help. After some time, in early 1030, Olaf learned that the Earl of Lade Håkon Eiriksson, Cnut's regent in Norway, had disappeared at sea, and gathered his men to make a swift return to Norway. Magnus was left to be fostered by Yaroslav and his wife Ingegerd.

In early 1031, a party including Magnus's uncle Harald Sigurdsson (later also to be king and then known as Harald Hardrada) arrived to report the news of his father's death at the Battle of Stiklestad. For the next few years, Magnus was educated in Old Russian and some Greek and was trained as a warrior. In 1030, Cnut appointed his first wife Ælfgifu and their son Svein as regents, but the Norwegians found their rule oppressive and, by the time of Cnut's death in 1035, they had been driven out and Magnus was established as king. Einar Thambarskelfir and Kalf Arnesson, who had both sought to be appointed regents under Cnut after Olaf's death in 1030, had gone together to Kievan Rus' to bring the boy back to rule as the King of Norway. After receiving the approval of Ingegerd, they returned with Magnus to Sigtuna in early 1035, and received backing from the Swedish king, brother of Magnus's stepmother Astrid. Astrid immediately became an important supporter of Magnus, and an army was gathered in Sweden, headed by Einar and Kalf, to place Magnus on the Norwegian throne.

== King of Norway and Denmark ==
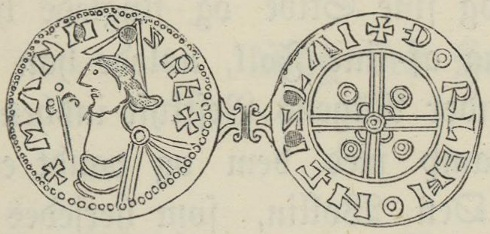
Coin minted for Magnus the Good in Denmark

Magnus ascended the Norwegian throne in 1035 at 11 years of age. At first, Magnus sought revenge against his father's enemies, but on Sigvatr's advice, he stopped doing so, which is why he became known as "good" or "noble".

Another son of Cnut, Harthacnut, was on the throne of Denmark and wanted his country to reunite with Norway, while Magnus initiated a campaign against Denmark around 1040. However, the noblemen of both countries brought the two kings together at the Göta älv. They made peace and agreed that the first of them to die would be succeeded by the other. In 1042, Harthacnut died while in England, and Magnus also became King of Denmark, in spite of a claim by Cnut's nephew Sweyn Estridsen, whom Harthacnut had left in control of Denmark when he went to England, and who had some support.

As part of consolidating his control, Magnus destroyed the Jomsborg, headquarters of the Jomsvikings. Sweyn fled east and returned as one of the leaders of an invasion by the Wends in 1043, which Magnus decisively defeated at the Battle of Lyrskov Heath, near Hedeby. In the battle, Magnus wielded Saint Olaf's battle-axe, named Hel after the goddess of death. He had dreamt of his father the night before, and the Norwegians swore that before the battle they could hear the bell that Saint Olaf had given to the Church of St. Clement in Kaupang, in Nidaros—a sign that the saint was watching over his son and the army. It was the greatest victory ever over the Wends, with up to 15,000 killed.

Sweyn continued to oppose Magnus in Denmark, although according to Heimskringla, they reached a settlement by which Sweyn became Earl of Denmark under Magnus.

Magnus wanted to reunite Cnut the Great's entire North Sea Empire by also becoming king of England. When Harthacnut died, the English nobles had chosen as their king Æthelred the Unready's son Edward (later known as Edward the Confessor); Magnus wrote to him that he intended to attack England with combined Norwegian and Danish forces and "he will then govern it who wins the victory." The English were mostly hostile to Magnus; Sweyn was made welcome there, although Edward's mother, Emma, curiously favored Magnus and in 1043 the king confiscated her property, with which by one report she had promised to assist Magnus.

Meanwhile, Magnus' uncle Harald Sigurdsson had returned to Norway from the east and contested his rule there, while Sweyn was still a threat in Denmark; Harald allied himself with Sweyn. Magnus chose to appease Harald, and made him his co-king in Norway in 1046.

== Death ==
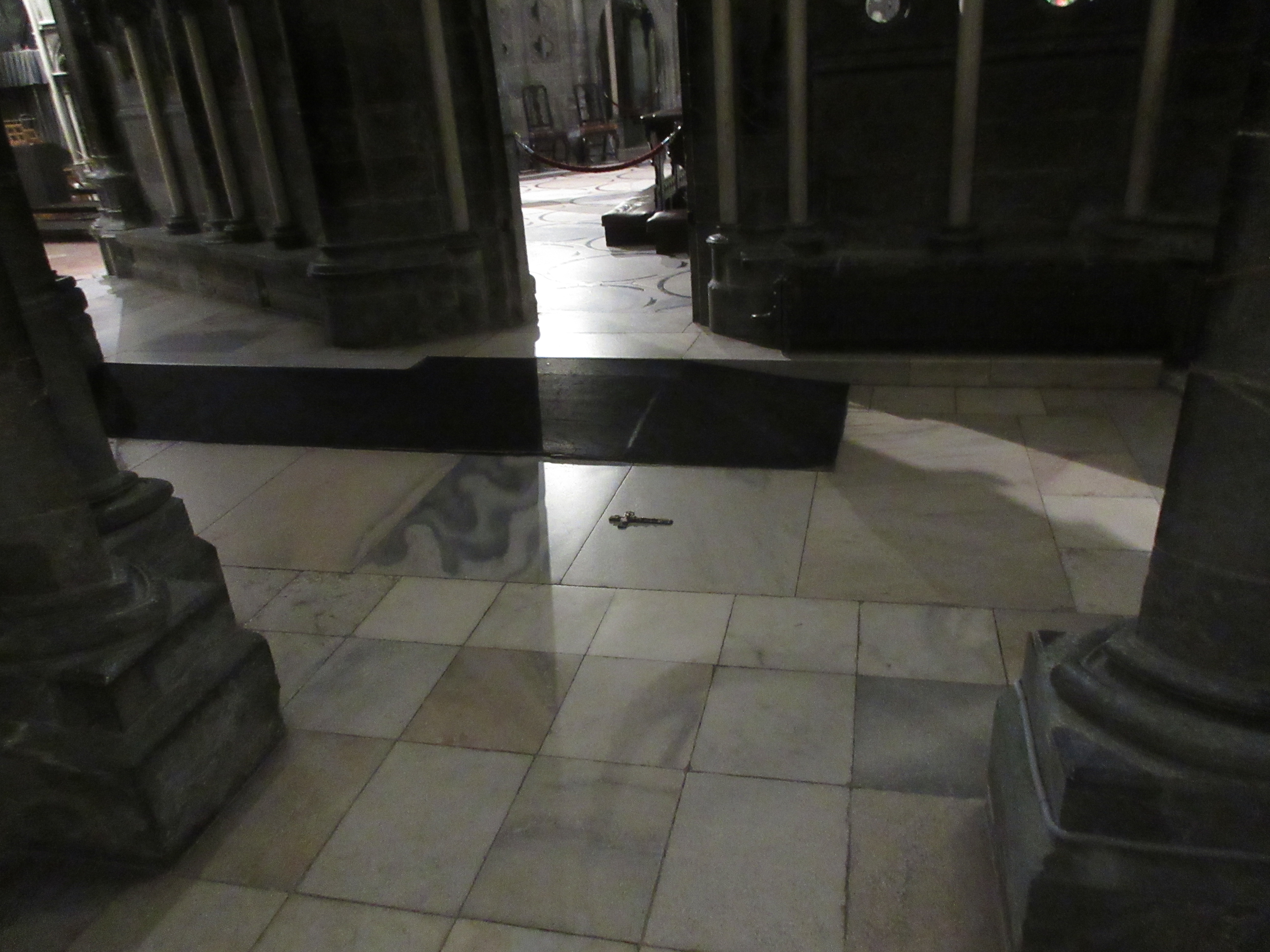
Site of the grave of King Magnus in Nidaros Cathedral, Trondheim.

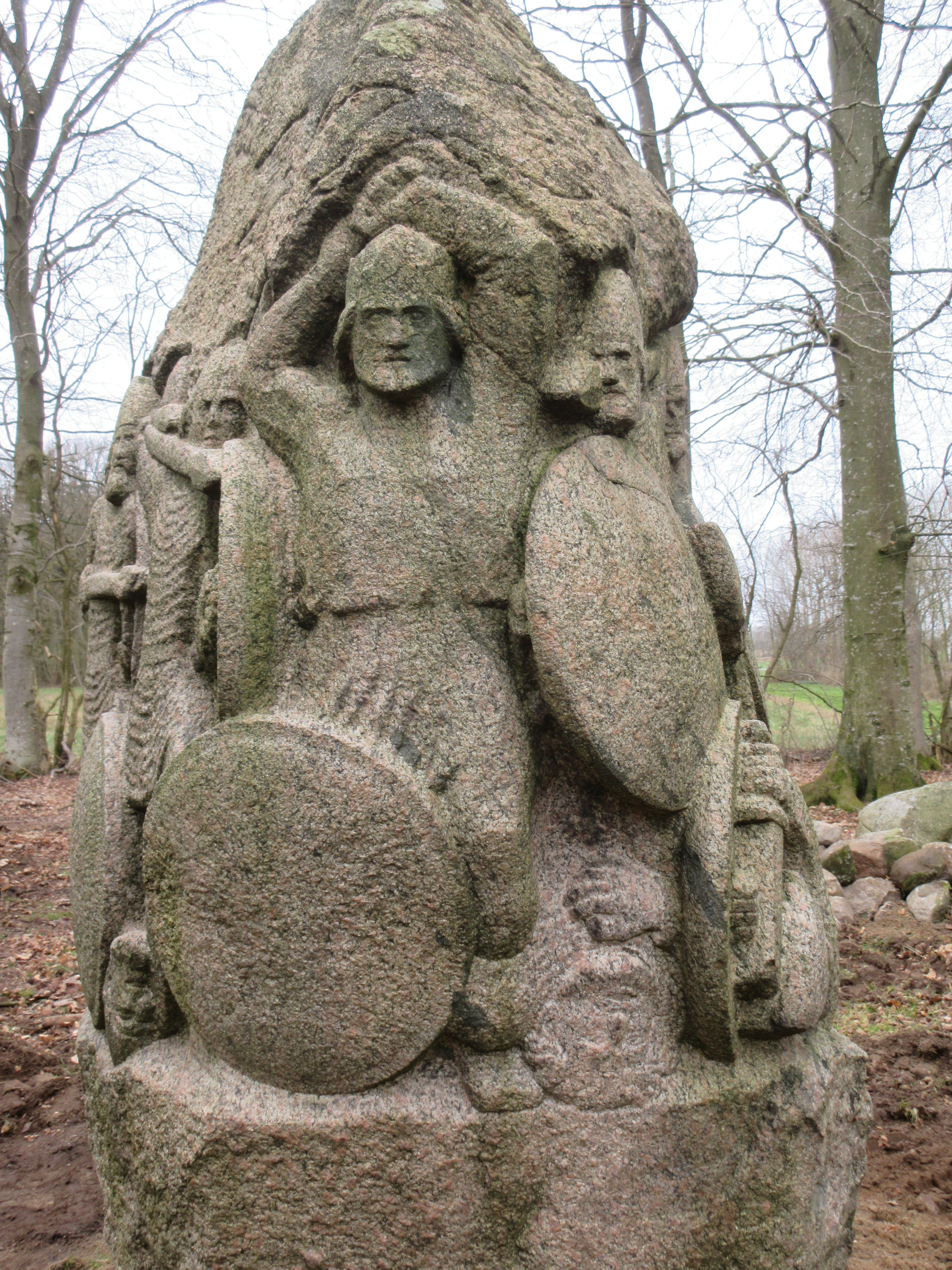
The Magnus Stone created by Niels Skovgaard in Skibelund Krat, Denmark

Sweyn increased the pressure on Magnus from his base in Scania, but by late 1046, Magnus had driven Sweyn out of Denmark. However, on 25 October 1047, Magnus suddenly died while in Denmark, either in Zealand or in Jutland, either in an accident or of a disease; accounts vary. Reports include falling overboard from one of the ships he was mustering to invade England and drowning, falling off a horse, and falling ill while on board a ship. He is said to have made Sweyn his heir in Denmark, and Harald in Norway; some say in a deathbed statement. Magnus was buried with his father in the cathedral at Nidaros, modern Trondheim.

== Physical appearance ==
Heimskringla describes Magnus as "of middle height, with regular features and light complexion. He had light blond hair, was well spoken and quick to make up his mind, was of noble character, most generous, a great warrior, and most valorous."

== Descendants ==
The line of Olaf II ended with Magnus' death. However, in 1280, Eric II of Norway, who was descended through his mother from Magnus' legitimate sister, Wulfhild, was crowned king of Norway.

Magnus was not married, but had a daughter out of wedlock, Ragnhild Magnusdatter, who married Haakon Ivarsson, a Norwegian nobleman. Ragnhild and Haakon had daughters Sunniva and Ragnhild. Sunniva had a son Hakon Sunnivasson, whose son became King Eric III of Denmark. Ragnhild married Paul Thorfinnsson, Earl of Orkney, and together they were the parents of Haakon Paulsson, who also became an earl of Orkney.

== Bibliography ==
- Morten, Øystein (2011). Magnus den gode. Sagakongene. Spartacus/Saga Bok. ISBN 978-82-430-0582-2.

Magnus the Good House of St. Olaf Cadet branch of the Fairhair dynasty Born: c. 1024 Died: 25 October 1047
Regnal titles
| Preceded by Cnut the Great; Sweyn Knutsson | King of Norway; 1035–1047 | Succeeded by Harald III |
| Preceded by Harthacnut | King of Denmark; 1042–1047 | Succeeded by Sweyn II |
Titles in pretence
| Preceded by Harthacnut | — TITULAR — King of England; 1042–1047 | Succeeded by Harald Hardrada; Sweyn II |
