= Sweyn Haakonsson =

Earl of the house of Hlaðir and co-ruler of Norway

Division of Norway after the Battle of Svolder according to the Heimskringla.

Sweyn Haakonsson (Old Norse: Sveinn Hákonarson, Norwegian: Svein Håkonsson) (died c. 1016) was an earl of the house of Hlaðir and co-ruler of Norway from 1000 to c. 1015. He was the son of earl Hákon Sigurðarson. He is first mentioned in connection with the battle of Hjörungavágr, where the Heimskringla says he commanded 60 ships. After the battle of Svolder in the year 1000, Sveinn became co-ruler of Norway with his half-brother, Eiríkr Hákonarson. After Eiríkr went to England in 1014, Sveinn was co-ruler with Hákon Eiríksson. In 1015, Óláfr Haraldsson arrived in Norway and claimed the throne. He defeated Sveinn and his allies in the battle of Nesjar. Sveinn retreated to Sweden, intending to muster a force to retake Norway but he died of an illness before he could return.

Sveinn married Hólmfríðr, who was either the daughter or sister of king Óláfr of Sweden. They had the daughter Sigríðr, who was married to Áslákr, son of Erlingr Skjálgsson. Another daughter, Gunnhildr, was married to Sveinn Úlfsson.

Only one court-poet, Bersi Skáldtorfuson, is recorded as being in Sveinn's service and very little of his poetry has survived throughout history.
