= Battle of Nesjar =

Sea battle off the coast of Norway in 1016

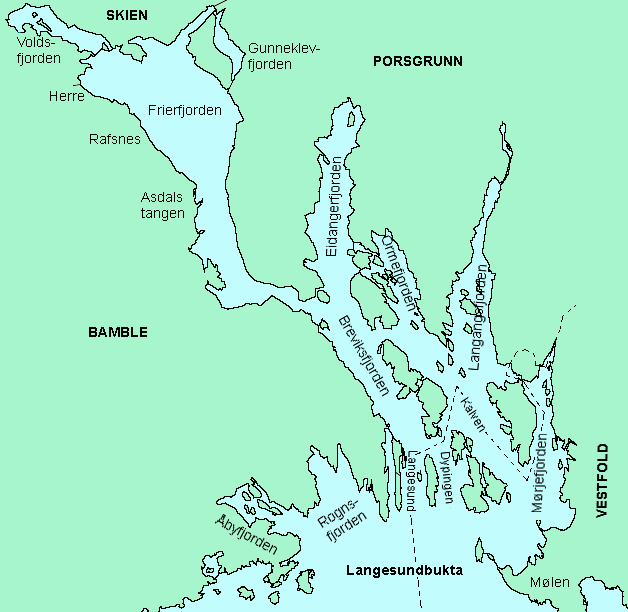
- Map of Frierfjord including Langesundfjorden
Date	March 25, 1016
Location	Oslofjord, Norway
Result	Victory for Olav Haraldsson: Sveinn Hákonarson retreated to Sweden

Belligerents
Norwegian forces loyal to Olav Haraldsson	Norwegian forces loyal to Sveinn Hákonarson; Sweden

Commanders and leaders
Olav Haraldsson	Sveinn Hákonarson

Strength
Unknown	Unknown

Casualties and losses
Unknown	Unknown

Battle of Nesjar (Slaget ved Nesjar) was a sea battle off the coast of Norway in 1016. It was a primary event in the reign of King Olav Haraldsson (later Saint Olav). Icelandic skald and court poet Sigvatr Þórðarson composed the poem Nesjavísur in memory of the battle. A monument known as the Nesjar Monument was erected on the 1000th anniversary of the battle, located in Helgeroa village in the present-day Larvik Municipality, Vestfold County, where the battle is believed to have occurred.

== Historic record ==
Tradition places the location of the battle in west end of Oslofjord, possibly near 58°59′30″N 9°49′38″E. The exact location is unknown, but it is somewhere in today's Langesundfjorden inlet in Frierfjord in Larvik Municipality in Vestfold. The fighting parties were the throne claimant Olav Haraldsson on one side and an alliance backing the Swedish vassal Sveinn Hákonarson on the other.

After the defeat of Olav Tryggvason at the Battle of Svolder, Norway had been divided into a Swedish part governed by Sveinn Hákonarson and a Danish part run by Eiríkr Hákonarson. However, after Eiríkr joined his brother-in-law Canute the Great in his campaign to conquer England, Danish rule folded, and power was assumed by Olav Haraldsson, a throne claimant from the Harald Fairhair family line.

Sveinn, who was based in Trøndelag, learned that Olav was rallying support in Eastern Norway. He set sail along the coast of Norway. Along the way he joined forces with those of several allies among Norway's farmer-chieftains. The most prominent of these was Erling Skjalgsson.

Olav Haraldsson, on the other hand, had finished raising his forces, and had begun his trip northwards to confront Sveinn. The fleets clashed off the coast on Palm Sunday 25 March 1016 . Few accounts of the battle survive; however, it is generally regarded as a fierce battle with heavy casualties. None of the major players were killed, as would be usual in this age of chieftains leading the line. However, Sveinn Hákonarson was chased off, thus relinquishing his grip on power. Sveinn retreated to Sweden, but he died of illness before he could muster a force to retake Norway.

The road now seemed open for King Olav to establish a unified rule of Norway. However, along the way he was later forced to ally with Erling Skjalgsson, an alliance which was always uneasy. It also ended violently when Erling Skjalgsson was killed in connection with the Battle of Boknafjorden in Rogaland during 1028. His followers got revenge two years later, when King Olav himself was killed in the Battle of Stiklestad.

== Other sources ==
- Krag, Claus Vikingtid og riksamling 800-1130 (Aschehougs Norgeshistorie. 1995) ISBN 9788203220302 Norwegian
- Hellberg, Staffan Slaget vid Nesjar och Sven jarl Håkonsson (Scripta Islandica, Uppsala 1972) Swedish
