= Battle of Helgeå =

Naval engagement which took place in 1026

Battle of the Helgeå
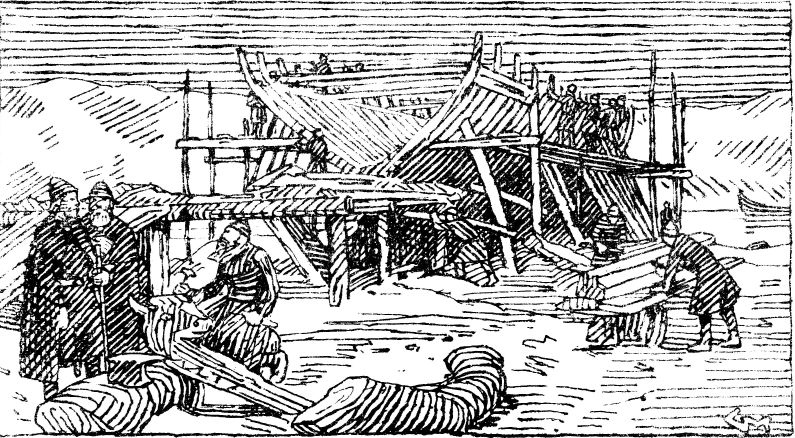
- Olav den helliges saga GM15
| Date | 1026 |
| Location | Skåne or Uppland |
| Result | Anglo-Danish victory |

Belligerents
| Denmark; England | Sweden; Norway |

Commanders and leaders
| Cnut the Great; Ulf the Earl | Anund Jacob; Olaf Haraldsson |

Strength
| ~600 ships | ~480 ships |

Casualties and losses
| Heavy | Minimal |

The Battle of Helgeå (Norwegian: Slaget ved Helgeå, Swedish: Slaget vid Helgeå), or Battle of the Holy River, was a naval engagement that took place in 1026 between joint Danish and English forces and a combined Norwegian and Swedish force, at the estuary of a river called Helge (Holy River) in Denmark or Sweden. (Note: There are two rivers that go by that name, and they are now both in Sweden but back then the southern province of Skåne/Scania was Danish. It has even been suggested that the battle in fact was fought in southeastern Uppland, where a river appears to have been called Helgå in the Middle Ages. According to that hypothesis, the site fits the topographical details of Snorri's account much better than eastern Scaniae.)

King Olaf II of Norway and King Anund Jacob of Sweden took advantage of the commitment of Danish King Cnut in England and began to launch attacks on the Danish in the Baltic Sea. The Swedish and Norwegian navies, led by kings Anund Jacob and Olaf II, lay in wait up the river for the navy of King Cnut, which was commanded by Danish earl Ulf Jarl.

Cnut's navy was massive; his own ship is said to have been 80 metres long. The Swedish and the Norwegian kings ordered a large dam to be made of peat and lumber on the river. When the Danish navy sailed in, the water was released, and a great many Danes and Englishmen drowned in the deluge. However, the main strength of Cnut's fleet lay outside the river harbour. After the ships in the harbour were destroyed, the rest of the fleet gathered together from all quarters. The kings Olaf and Anund Jacob, seeing they had got all the victory that fate permitted them to gain for the moment, let their ships retreat. If the battle had been renewed, they would have suffered a great loss of men because Cnut had more ships. King Cnut did not pursue them.

Olaf II of Norway, however, sought to continue the war against Denmark, requesting Swedish assistance. The Swedes and their king, after suffering more casualties than the Norwegians, did not want to pursue the war and made peace with Denmark. While Olaf II of Norway and the Norwegians were left on their own. This left Cnut as the dominant leader in Scandinavia. It has been speculated that the Swedish city Sigtuna was held by Cnut; there were coins struck there that called him king, but there is no narrative record of his occupation. These coins are, however, usually regarded as copies of coins minted in Denmark. Coins stating that the Swedish king Olof Skötkonung was King of England have also been found in Sigtuna.

== Primary sources ==
The battle is retold in skaldic poetry and in sources such as the Danish Gesta Danorum by Saxo Grammaticus and the Icelandic Saga of Olaf the Holy by Snorri Sturluson. Opinions are divided as to whether the location was at the Helge River of eastern Scania, Denmark, or Helgeå in Uppland, Sweden.

In the Anglo-Saxon Chronicle, the battle is dated to 1025, and the Swedes won the battle.

A.D. 1025. This year King Cnut, went to Denmark with a fleet to the holm by the holy river, where against him there came Ulf and Eglaf, with a very large force both by land and sea, from Sweden. There were very many men lost on the side of King Cnut, both Danish and English; and the Swedes had possession of the field of battle.

== Other sources ==
- Rosborn, Sven Den skånska historien (Vikingarna. Malmö: 2004)
- The Battle of Helgå, as told in the Saga of Olaf Haraldsson, by Snorri Sturluson.
