= Earls of Lade =

9th-11th century Norse dynasty in Norway

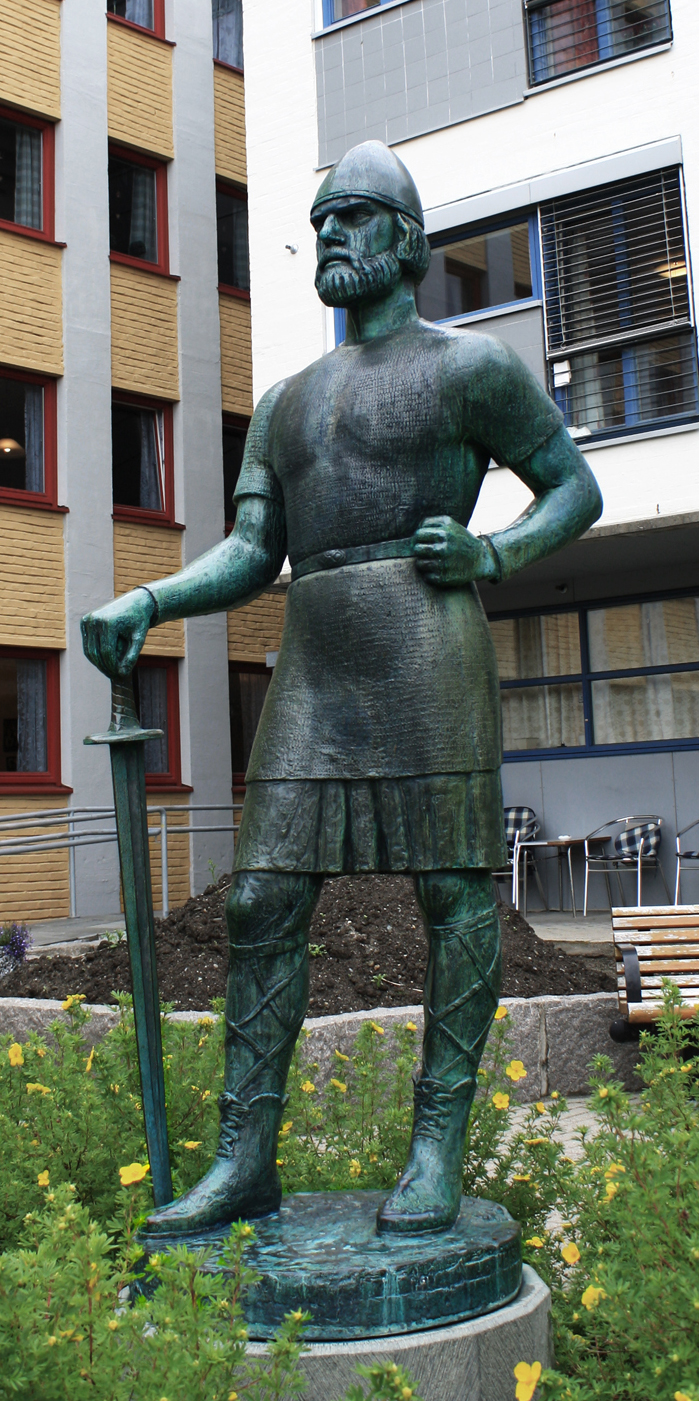
Ladejarlen (1930) by sculptor Harald Samuelsen (1881–1953) Statue located in Trondheim

The Earls of Lade (Norwegian: ladejarler) were a dynasty of Norse jarls who ruled what is now Trøndelag and Hålogaland from the 9th century to the 11th century. Lade is sometimes called Hlathðr or Hlathir by historians.

The seat of the Earls of Lade was at Lade Gaard (Old Norse: Hlaðir), now located in the eastern parts of the city of Trondheim. The site is near the seaside of the Trondheimsfjord, which was an important waterway in the Viking Age.

According to Snorri, King Harald I of Norway was a great commander but lacked a fleet. For that he was assisted by Håkon Grjotgardsson. In gratitude Harald made him the first earl of Lade.

== Notable Earls of Lade ==
- Hákon Grjótgarðsson (c. 860–870 – c. 900–920), an ally and father-in-law of Harald Fairhair
- Sigurðr Hákonarson (died 962), friend and advisor of Hákon the Good
- Hákon Sigurðarson (c. 937–995), ruler of Norway from about 975 to 995
- Eiríkr Hákonarson (960s – 1020s), governor of the majority of Norway under Svein Forkbeard, and Earl of Northumbria.
- Sveinn Hákonarson (died c. 1016), governor of a part of Norway under Olaf the Swede
- Hákon Eiríksson (died c. 1029–1030), governor of Norway under Canute the Great, last of the Earls of Lade

== Other sources ==
- Holmsen, Andreas (1976) Norges historie: fra de eldste tider til 1660 (Oslo: Universitetsforlaget) ISBN 82-00-03244-2
- Stylegar, Frans-Arne (2013) Håkon Jarl (Oslo: Spartacus forlag AS) ISBN 978-82-430-0579-2
- Titlestad, Torgrim (2011) Norge i vikingtid (Stavanger: Saga Bok AS) ISBN 978-82-91640-59-4
- Thuesen, Nils Petter (2011) Norges historie (Oslo: Forlaget Historie og Kultur) ISBN 978-8292870518

== See also ==
- Sæmingr, legendary ancestor of the dynasty
- Háleygjatal, a fragmentary 10th century genealogical poem about the dynasty
