= Ingeborg Tryggvasdotter =

Ingeborg Tryggvasdotter was the daughter of Tryggve Olafsson (died 963) and Astrid Eiriksdotter, the great-granddaughter of Harald Fairhair, and the sister of Olaf I of Norway. She married the Swedish earl Ragnvald Ulfsson, first the earl of Västergötland and later of Staraja Ladoga. They had two sons, Uleb Ragnvaldsson and Eilif, who became earls in Kievan Rus'.

Desmond Seward credits Ingeborg with playing an active role in the efforts to end conflict between Sweden and Norway by arranging a marriage between Olaf Haraldsson and Ingegerd, daughter of Olof Skötkonung.
