= Astrid Eiriksdotter =

10th-century Queen of Viken, Norway (b. 925)

- Queen consort of Viken, Norway
- Born: c. 925; Obrestad, Nærbø, Rogaland
- Spouses: Tryggve Olafsson; Lodin
- Issue: 6, including Olaf Tryggvason; Ingeborg Tryggvasdotter
- Father: Eirik Bjodaskalle Kåresson

Astrid Eiriksdotter (born c. 925) was Queen of Viken, Norway (Vingulmark and Rånrike) in the 10th century as consort of Tryggve Olafsson. She was the mother of Olaf Tryggvason who ruled as King of Norway from 995 to 1000. Astrid's life was recorded in texts including Historia Norwegiæ, Ágrip af Nóregskonungasögum and Heimskringla.

== History ==
Astrid was born c. 925 in Obrestad, Nærbø, Rogaland. She was the daughter of Eirik Bjodaskalle Kåresson. She had a brother, Sigurd Eiriksson.

Astrid was married to King Tryggve Olafsson of Viken, Norway (Vingulmark and Rånrike). By Tryggve, Astrid was the mother of Ingeborg Tryggvasdotter and Astrid Tryggvasdotter. Ingeborg married Ragnvald Ulfsson, the Jarl of Västergötland and later the ruler of Staraja Ladoga. They had two sons, Uleb Ragnvaldsson and Eilif Ragnvaldsson, who became earls in Kievan Rus'.

After Tryggve was killed in Bohuslän by Harald Greycloak, third son of Eirik Bloodaxe and Gunnhild, Mother of Kings, Astrid fled from Norway while pregnant with her third child. The Historia Norwegiæ of the late twelfth century states that Astrid gave birth to her son Olaf Tryggvason on the Orkney Islands, whereas Ágrip af Nóregskonungasögum says that she fled to Orkney with Olaf when he was three years old.

According to the Heimskringla Astrid and her son Olaf travelled to her father's home in Oppland, until she was located there by men in the service of Gunnhild, who had sent soldiers to kidnap or kill her infant son. Astrid disguised herself and her son and peasants and they fled to Sweden under the protection of Håkan the Old. Greycloak sent emissaries to Håkan, and asked for permission to take the Astrid's son back to Norway to be raised by Gunhild. Håkan agreed, but Astrid refused, took her son and fled again. After evading her enemies, Astrid next found sanctuary for herself and her son in Kievan Rus', where her brother Sigurd was in the service of Vladimir the Great as a high-ranking official.

Also according to the Heimskringla, Astrid and her son later set sail on a merchant ship bound for Novgorod but were captured by Oeselian pirates in the Baltic Sea. Astrid and Olaf were separated and were sold into slavery. Olaf was sold to a man named Klerkon, then was sold to a man named Klerk for a ram, then to a man called Reas for a fine cloak. Six years later he was recognised by his uncle Sigurd, who had travelled to Estonia to collect taxes for Vladimir. Sigurd took Olaf to live under the protection of Vladimir.

Astrid's son Olaf became King of Norway in 995. A year after her son had become King of Norway, Astrid was found for sale in a slave market in Estonia. A rich merchant named Lodin from Viken recognised her and bought her to set her free. Astrid married Lodin and they returned to Norway where her son was King. Icelandic historian Snorri Sturluson recorded that Astrid and Lodin had three children, Torkjel Nevja Lodinson, Ingerid Lodinsdotter and Ingegjerd Lodinsdotter.
