= Gunnilda of Sweden =

Gunnilda of Sweden; Swedish: Gunhild and Gunilla even Gyda - may refer to:

- Gunnilda, Danish and Swedish queen consort, 10th century (possibly same person as Sigrid the Haughty)
- Gunnilda, Swedish queen consort 11th century
- Gunnilda, Swedish queen consort 1585
- Gunnilda, Swedish princess 11th century, Danish queen consort
