= Anund Jacob =

King of Sweden from 1022 to 1050

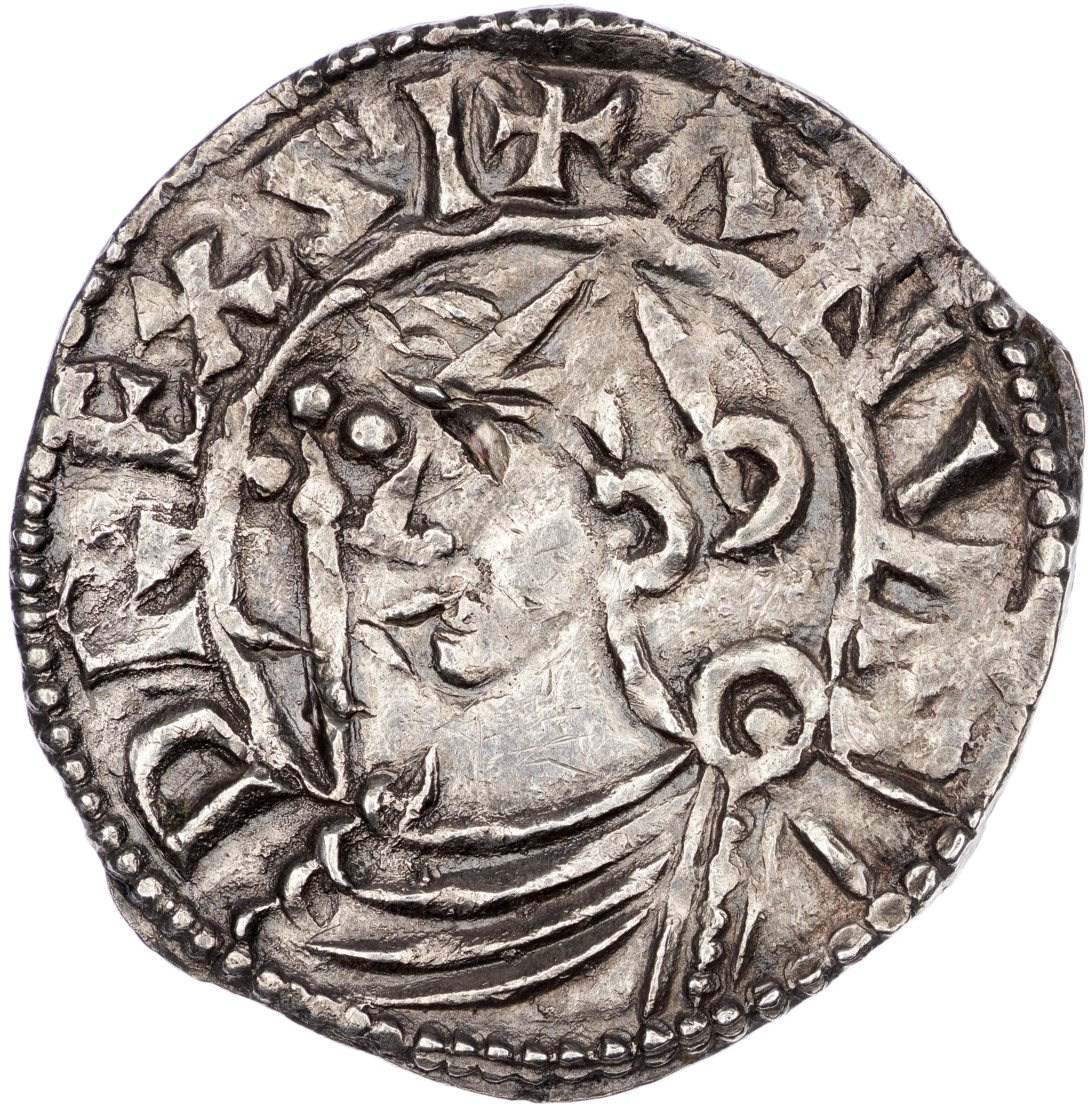
- Silver coin minted during reign of Anund Jacob c. 1020–1030

King of Sweden
- Reign: 1022–1050
- Predecessor: Olof Skötkonung
- Successor: Emund the Old
- Born: c. 25 July 1008 or 1010
- Died: 1050 (aged 41–42)
- Consort: Gunnhildr Sveinsdóttir
- Issue: Gyda, Queen of Denmark
- House: Munsö
- Father: Olof Skötkonung
- Mother: Estrid of the Obotrites
- Religion: Chalcedonian Christianity

Anund Jacob, also Jakob or James (Old Norse: Ǫnundr Jakob; c. 25 July 1008/10 – c. 1050), was King of Sweden from 1022 until around 1050. He is believed to have been born on 25 July, in either 1008 or 1010 as Jakob, the son of King Olof Skötkonung and Queen Estrid. Being the second Christian king of the Swedish realm, his long and partly turbulent reign saw the increasing dissemination of Christianity as well as repeated attempts to influence the balance of power in Scandinavia. Throughout his reign, he tried to subvert the rising Danish hegemony in Scandinavia by supporting the Norwegian monarchy. He also supported the reign of his brother-in-law Yaroslav the Wise in Kievan Rus. He is referred to in positive terms in German and Norse historical sources. His reign was one of the longest in Sweden during the Viking Age and Middle Ages.

== Accession ==
The main sources for Anund Jacob's reign are the near-contemporary ecclesiastic chronicle of Adam of Bremen and several Norse histories from the 12th and 13th centuries, in particular Snorri Sturluson's Heimskringla. Adam and Snorri both relate that Anund Jacob's father Olof Skötkonung (c. 995–1022) ran into trouble with his subjects towards the end of his reign. According to Adam, the still pagan population of Svealand urged the fervently Christian ruler to withdraw to Västergötland. Snorri, on the other hand, asserts that King Olof's high-handed rule caused the Swedes to rise against him, whereby his young son Jacob was hailed as king. When the Swedish Thing was to elect him the ruler of Sweden, the people objected to his non-Scandinavian name. They then gave him the name of Anund. Olof and Anund Jacob eventually came to an agreement: Olof was to retain his royal title for the rest of his life, but Anund Jacob would be co-ruler and govern part of the realm, and had to support the peasantry if Olof caused further trouble. In Snorri's chronology this happened in c. 1019. Three years later Olof died, leaving Anund Jacob as the sole ruler.

== Political agenda ==
Indigenous Swedish historiography has preserved very meager recollections of the pre-1250 rulers, but points out Anund Jacob as a heavy-handed master. The enumeration of kings appended to the Westrogothic law (c. 1240) says that he had the epithet of Kolbränna ("Coal-burner") as he had the habit of burning down the houses of his opponents. This may refer to the practice known from medieval Sweden of legally burning the houses of people who opposed the authorities. A different opinion of his character is given by Adam of Bremen: "Certainly he was young of years, but he surpassed all his predecessors in wisdom and piety. No king was as beloved by the Swedish people as Anund". The Norse sagas emphasize his amicable and helpful attitude to his royal Norwegian kinsmen.

Anund Jacob continued the minting of coins in Sigtuna in Central Sweden; however, the issuing of coins was broken off later during his reign, and was only resumed by King Canute I in the late 12th century. Snorri mentions Central Sweden, Västergötland and Småland among the regions ruled by Anund Jacob, but his ideas of Sweden might be influenced by conditions in the High Middle Ages. A poem from the 1040s, describing a Norwegian battle against Danes and Swedish auxiliaries, suggests that at least some Geats stood under Anund Jacob: "Geatic shield and hauberk / did I bring home from the battle".

According to Adam of Bremen, Christianity reached rather widely in the reign of Anund Jacob, with missionary work led by Bishop Thurgot of Skara in Västergötland until 1030 when he was nominally succeeded by Gottskalk. Both were appointed by the Archbishopric of Hamburg-Bremen. Gottskalk, however, was a passive church magnate who preferred to stay home in Germany. An English missionary, Sigfrid, filled the void to an extent. From a Norwegian base, he visited Sweden, Götaland "and all the islands beyond the northern land".

King Anund Jacob's political agenda included maintaining the balance of power in Scandinavia, which is why he supported the Norwegian kings Olaf II (Olav the Saint) and Magnus I against Denmark's and England's king Cnut the Great during the 1020s and 1030s. According to Snorri, Cnut tried to neutralize Anund Jacob, when a dispute flared up with Olaf around 1025, by sending him rich presents and offers of friendship. However, the envoys noted Anund Jacob's strong affinity to Olaf, who was married to his sister Astrid. In fact Anund Jacob traveled with a large entourage to Kungahälla where he met Olaf for a friendly parley. Some time later, when Cnut was away tending his English kingdom, Olaf attacked and ravaged Sjaelland, while Anund Jacob came down with a fleet from Svealand to attack Scania. The allies combined their forces and awaited Cnut, who returned from England with a superior fleet in 1026. While the late Norse accounts are highly unreliable, some details of the war are mentioned in contemporary scaldic verses and confirm Anund Jacob's intervention.

== The Battle of Helgeå ==
According to Snorri's account of the Battle of Helgeå, the Swedish and Norwegian fleets arrived at the estuary of Helge å on the east coast of Scania. There they prepared a trap by building a levee of wooden branches and turf close to the estuary. When Cnut's fleet approached, the levee was torn down and the rushing water and floating logs created disorder in the Danish fleet. However, many Danish ships were soon ready to confront the Swedes and Norwegians. In the face of the superior enemy, Anund Jacob and Olaf withdrew. Olaf later sneaked back to Norway with his entourage via Småland and Västergötland.

The actual circumstances of the Battle of Helgeå are debated among historians due to conflicting sources. The near-contemporary Anglo-Saxon Chronicle asserts, under the year 1025 (error for 1026): "This year King Cnut went to Denmark with a fleet to the holm by the holy river [Helge å]; where against him there came Ulf and Eilaf, with a very large force both by land and sea, from Sweden. There were very many men lost on the side of King Cnut, both of Danish and English; and the Swedes had possession of the field of battle." The identity of Ulf and Eilaf (probably subordinate officers to Anund Jacob) is not known - possibly they are identical with two brothers by that name who were sons of the Swedish or Geatish magnate Ragnvald Ulfsson. They could also be the Anglo-Danish Ulf Jarl and his brother Eilaf, since some late accounts allege that Ulf fought on the Swedish-Norwegian side in the war. A contemporary scaldic verse by Sigvat Thordarson partly conforms with Snorri by stating that Cnut beat back or stopped the Swedish attack (Svíum hnekkðir Þu) and defended his realm against two kings. However, this is a poem in praise of Cnut and thus not an impartial source. It is therefore not entirely clear if Anund Jacob and Olaf were victorious over or defeated by Cnut. It has even been suggested that the battle in fact was fought in southeastern Uppland, where a river appears to have been called Helgå in the Middle Ages. According to that hypothesis, the site fits the topographical details of Snorri's account much better than eastern Scaniae.

Thus, the results of the war are not clear in either of the sources. It is obvious, however, that the Swedish-Norwegian attack failed, since Cnut remained master of his realm and was able to make a pilgrimage to Rome in 1027. On his way back to Denmark he dictated a letter, saying that he intended to make peace with the peoples and nations which had tried to deprive him of his kingdom and life but had failed since God deprived them of their power. In the following year Olaf II was driven from Norway and Cnut was hailed as overlord in his stead. Cnut also claimed to be king over part of the Swedes in these years. Coins in the name of Cnut were minted in Svealand at about the same time. All this suggests that the peoples around Lake Mälaren may have ousted Anund Jacob for a while, and hailed Cnut. The possibility of a brief Danish suzerainty in Central Sweden has engendered considerable debate; on one hand Cnut's coins might simply be copied from the Anglo-Danish coinage in a mechanical way, but on the other hand a number of numismatists have argued that the coins are too original in making to be considered copies. Curiously, coins stating that the Swedish king Olof Skötkonung was King of England have also been found in Sigtuna. At any rate King Anund Jacob was in power again around 1030.

== Supporting Magnus the Good ==
When expelled by Cnut, Olaf II of Norway went via Sweden to Kievan Rus with his son Magnus. In 1030 he made an attempt to regain his throne. Anund Jacob provided him with a force of 400 skilled men, and allowed him to recruit as many men as possible from his realm. Olaf's plan seems to have been to bypass the Danish fleet typically stationed close to Öresund and try to seize the then Norwegian capital of Nidaros directly by entering through Jämtland. Snorri Sturluson reports that Anund Jacob provided Olaf with pathfinders that guided him through the treacherous terrain of Dalarna to reach the then Norwegian province of Härjedalen. However, Olaf was killed fighting a Norwegian peasant army at the Battle of Stiklestad in 1030. Five years later his son Magnus came over to Sigtuna in Sweden from Rus and met with his stepmother Astrid Olofsdotter, Anund Jacob's sister. According to Snorri's account, supported by a number of contemporary scaldic verses, Astrid advocated Magnus's cause at a thing in Hangrar. A sizable force of Swedish warriors gathered under Magnus, who invaded Norway via Hälsingland in 1035. The enterprise was a great success and the pretender was hailed as king (Magnus I, Magnus the Good). Cnut the Great died in the same year and his sons lacked his capacity. When the last of them, Harthacnut, died in 1042, Magnus inherited Denmark as well. Anund Jacob's policy of maintaining a Nordic power balance can be seen in the agenda shift that followed. Anund Jacob kept Cnut's nephew Sweyn Estridsen as a protégé and supported his pretensions to the Danish throne. As related by both Snorri and Adam of Bremen, Sweyn made repeated attempts to establish his authority in Denmark, only to be defeated by King Magnus on each occasion. After every defeat, he found refuge with Anund Jacob in Sweden. Magnus died in 1047 and bequeathed Norway to his uncle Harald Hardrada, while Sweyn's right to the Danish throne was acknowledged. In spite of that, a new war flared up between Sweyn and Harald, where Anund Jacob seems to have continued supporting Sweyn. The struggle was still on when Anund Jacob died.

== Eastern politics ==
The Russian Nestor Chronicle relates that the "Varyag prince" Yakun, dressed in a golden cloak, led an eastbound Swedish expedition to the other side of the Baltic Sea in 1024. He provided military reinforcements to Yaroslav I the Wise (Anund Jacob's brother in law) in a battle against Mstislav of Chernigov. The battle was fought during a thunderstorm and ended in a defeat for the allies, and Yakun went back across the sea. According to Gudmund Jöran Adlerbeth of the Swedish Academy (1802), Yakun was identical with King Anund Jacob and was blind. Alternatively, the name Yakun could correspond to someone named Håkan, unknown in the history of the era.

The late 13th or early 14th-century Yngvars saga víðförla tells of Anund Jacob's feats east of the Baltic before he became king. According to the saga, the Swedes used to harvest taxes from the Baltic people called Semigallians, in Old Norse Seimgalir, in present-day Latvia. In the time of Olof Skötkonung, this tribe refused to pay what was due to them. After some time, Olof sent his son Anund Jacob and grand-nephew Ingvar the Far-Travelled to reestablish the tribute system. With three ships, they crossed the Baltic and convoked a thing to convince the Semigallian leaders to continue to yield taxes to the Swedes. The local king and most chieftains accepted this. Due to Ingvar's convincing persuasion, the Semigallians and Swedes reached an agreement.

Three tribal Semigallian chieftains, however, refused to pay the tributes and armed their troops to banish the Swedes. The Semigallian king provided Anund Jacob and Ingvar with soldiers to defeat the rebels. A lethal battle followed, and the rebels finally broke and fled. The most rebellious Semigallian leader was captured and hanged. The two other chieftains escaped. The Swedish Vikings took plenty of gold, silver and precious things from the Semigallian rebels after the war. Olof Skötkonung received rich treasures from the expedition and Ingvar became the most powerful chief in Sweden next to the king. The value of the high medieval saga has been debated, and the expedition is not mentioned in other sources. However, epigraphic and archaeological evidence confirms that Swedes sailed to Semigallia in this period, and that Swedish people settled in sizeable colonies there during the Viking Age.

A major Swedish Viking expedition to the east, led by Ingvar, occurred around 1040 and is mentioned on a large number of rune stones from Central Sweden. Judging from the inscriptions, the enterprise ended up in Serkland (the Muslim lands to the southeast of Russia), apparently under disastrous circumstances. The late Icelandic Yngvars saga víðförla contains all sorts of fantastic details about the expedition. According to one hypothesis, based on comparisons with Georgian chronicles, the Vikings reached Georgia where they intervened in the civil war between King Bagrat IV and the rebel Liparit.

== Death and succession ==
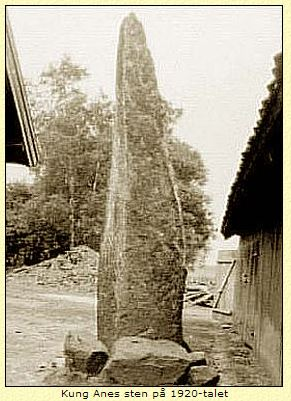
King Ane's Stone at the suggested burial site of King Anund Jacob

Anund Jacob's reign has traditionally been dated from 1022 to approximately 1050, but there is uncertainty about the year he died. He was probably alive in 1049, since Adam places his death after the death of the Danish prince Bjørn, an earl in England, in that year; his half-brother and successor Emund is certain to have ruled Sweden in the summer of 1060. According to Adam of Bremen, Anund Jacob was married to a certain Gunhild who might previously have been the wife of Sven Estridsen. Adam does not suggest that they had any children, but a later chronicler Saxo Grammaticus (c. 1200) says that Sweyn Estridsen's spouse Gyda was a daughter of the Swedish king, by implication Anund Jacob. It has been suggested by Birger Nerman and others that King Anund Jacob was buried where King Ane's Stone is located in West Gothland.

Two skalds are known to have served Anund Jacob: Sighvatr Þórðarson and Óttarr svarti.

The Hervarar saga from the 13th century concludes with a chronicle of the Swedish kings which briefly epitomizes Anund Jacob's reign:

Önundr hét sonr Óláfs konungs sænska, er konungdóm tók eptir hann ok varð sóttdauðr. Á hans dögum fell Óláfr konungr inn helgi á Stiklastöðum. Eymundr hét annarr sonr Óláfs sænska, er konungdóm tók eptir bróður sinn.

King Olaf the Swede had a son called Önund who succeeded him. He died in his bed. In his day fell King Olaf the Saint at Stiklestad. Olaf the Swede had another son called Eymund, who came to the throne after his brother.

== Notes and references ==
Anund Jakob House of Munsö Born: July 25, 1008 or 1010 Died: 1050
Regnal titles
Preceded by Olof Skötkonung	King of Sweden; 1022–1050	Succeeded by Emund the Old
