= Ragnvald Ulfsson =

Swedish noble (fl. c. 1100)

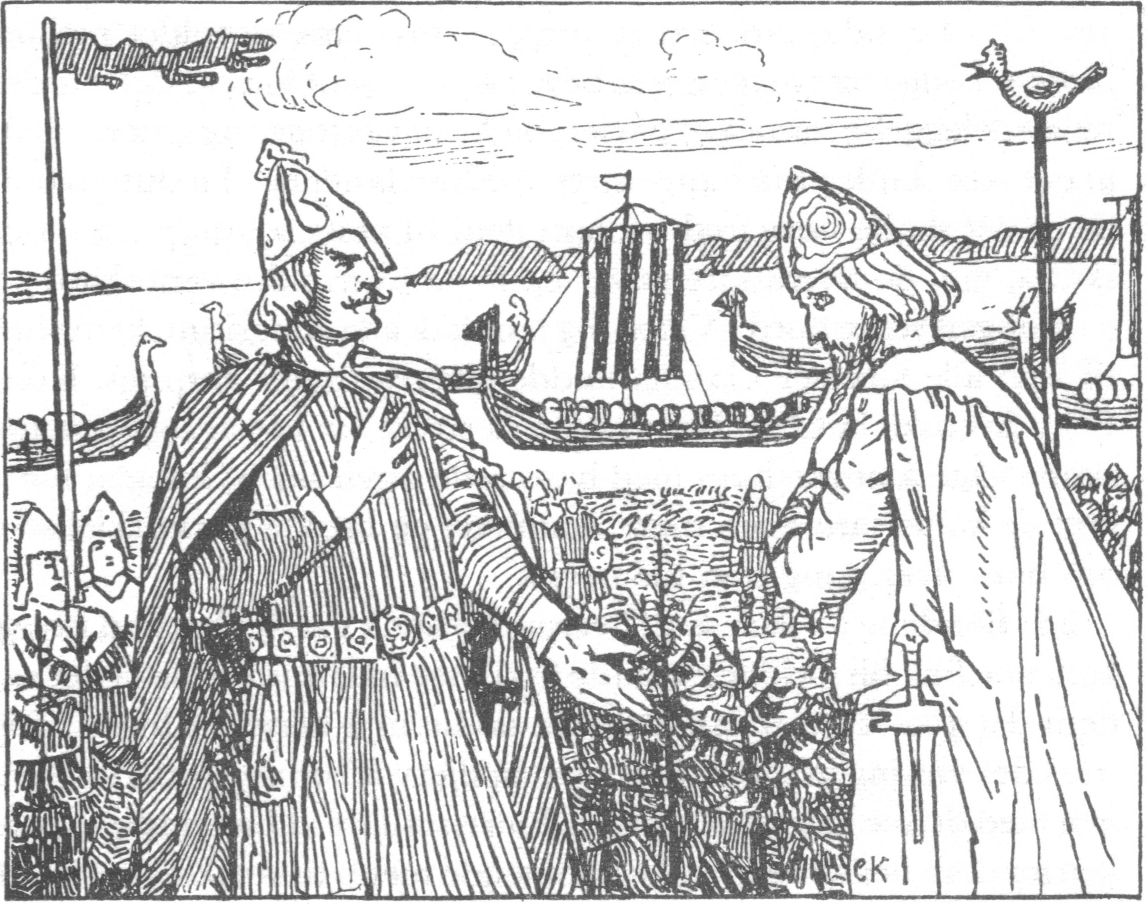
King Olaf meets Jarl Ragnvald in an illustration from an 1899 edition of Heimskringla

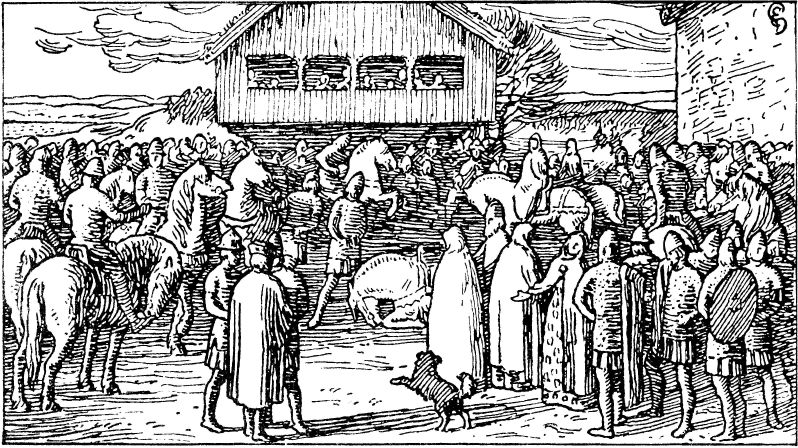
Ragnvald and Astrid arrive at Sarpsborg

Ragnvald Ulfsson the Old (fl. beginning 11th century) was a jarl of Västergötland or Östergötland and was married to a sister of King Olav Tryggvason.

== Biography ==
According to Snorri, Ragnvald was the son of jarl Ulf Tostesson. He was also the foster-son of Þorgnýr the Lawspeaker. Through his aunt Sigrid the Haughty, he was the cousin of Swedish King Olof Skötkonung. He was married to Ingeborg Tryggvasdotter, daughter of Tryggve Olavsson, son of Olaf Haraldsson Geirstadalf and grandson of King Harald Fairhair, and Astrid Eiriksdotter.

When Olaf Haraldsson became king of Norway in 1015, a war erupted with Sweden and Norwegians forces had pillaged in Västergötland. But then Norwegian King Olaf proposed to the Swedish princess Ingigerd Olofsdotter, the daughter of Sweden's King Olof Skötkonung. This would result in peace and a royal alliance which would favor Ragnvald who was related to both parties.

However, at the Thing at Gamla Uppsala, Ragnvald and his foster-father Þorgnýr the Lawspeaker had to persuade King Olof Skötkonung to promise his daughter to King Olaf, whom he did not like. When the Swedish king failed to deliver his daughter, Ragnvald realized that he was in trouble. He has not only fallen out of grace with the Swedish king, but he could also expect the revenge of the Norwegians.

During a visit by the skald Sigvatr Þórðarson, Ragnvald learned that Prince Yaroslav I the Wise of Kievan Rus' had proposed to Ingigerd, and so he developed the idea that King Olaf should marry Astrid Olofsdotter, an illegitimate daughter of Olof Skötkonung, who was staying with Ragnvald. Sigvat promised to deliver the proposal and the Norwegian king accepted. Ragnvald delivered Astrid at Sarpsborg in Norway and she married the King Olaf after Christmas of 1019.

King Olof Skötkonung was now so upset that he intended to hang Ragnvald at the next Thing. However, when Ingigerd Olofsdotter married Yaroslav I the Wise, she received Staraja Ladoga (Aldeigjuborg) and Ingria (Ingermanland) as a wedding gift from Yaroslav. Ingigerd managed to arrange that Ragnvald became the jarl of both Staraja Ladoga and Ingria. Consequently Olof Skötkonung let Ragnvald depart with Ingigerd in the summer of 1019.

== Marriage ==
Married to Ingeborg Tryggvasdotter. Children:

1. Uleb Ragnvaldsson Jarl
2. Eilif Ragnvaldsson Jarl
3. Ostrida Ragnvalsdatter

He has been considered to have fathered king Stenkil, with Astrid Nialsdotter from Norway. However this is based on later Icelandic sources, and the identification of Ragnvald with Ragnvald the Old of Hervarar saga.

== Saga sources ==
Ragnvald is mentioned in the skaldic poem Austrfaravísur, ascribed to Sigvatr Þórðarson, skald of King Olaf Haraldsson of Norway (Olaf the Holy), who had been on a diplomatic mission to Sweden. This poem is quoted in the 13th century sagas Fagrskinna and Snorri Sturluson's Heimskringla. In addition to the poem, Fagrskinna only briefly mentions Ragnvald, while Heimskringla contains a more elaborate account of him. This 13th-century prose text is not considered historically reliable. Fagrskinna's account of Olaf the Holy's betrothal to Ingigerd, and eventual wedding with Astrid, differs significantly from the account in Heimskringla. In Fagrskinna's account, Ragnvald is not given a prominent role in the proceedings.

== Literature ==
- Larsson, Lars-Ove (1993, 2000). Vem är vem i svensk historia, från år 1000 till 1900. Prisma, Stockholm. ISBN 91-518-3427-8
- Larsson, Mats G (2002). Götarnas Riken : Upptäcktsfärder Till Sveriges Enande. Bokförlaget Atlantis AB ISBN 978-91-7486-641-4
- Lagerquist, Lars O. (1997). Sveriges Regenter, från forntid till nutid. Norstedts, Stockholm. ISBN 91-1-963882-5
- Winroth, Anders (1995–1997) "Ragnvald Ulfsson", Svenskt Biografiskt Lexikon, volume 29, page 616.
- Wisén, Theodor, revised by Erik Brate (1915), "Ragnvald Ulfsson", Nordisk familjebok, volume 22, 913–914
