= Henry I of France =

King of the Franks from 1031 to 1060

Henry I
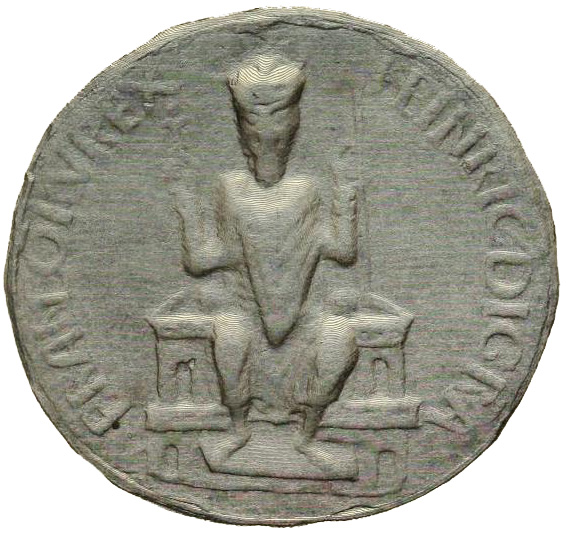
- Effigy of Henry from his seal

King of the Franks
- Reign: 20 July 1031 – 4 August 1060
- Coronation: 14 May 1027, Reims (co-king)
- Predecessor: Robert II
- Successor: Philip I
- Born: 4 May 1008; Reims, Kingdom of France
- Died: 4 August 1060 (aged 52); Vitry-aux-Loges, Kingdom of France
- Burial: Saint Denis Basilica, Paris, France
- Spouses: Matilda of Frisia; Anne of Kiev
- Issue more...: Philip I of France; Hugh I, Count of Vermandois
- House: Capet
- Father: Robert II of France
- Mother: Constance of Arles

Henry I (4 May 1008 – 4 August 1060) was King of the Franks from 1031 to 1060. The royal demesne of France reached its smallest size during his reign, and for this reason he is often seen as emblematic of the weakness of the early Capetians. This is not entirely agreed upon, however, as other historians regard him as a strong but realistic king, who was forced to conduct a policy mindful of the limitations of the French monarchy.

== Reign ==
A member of the House of Capet, Henry was born in Reims, the son of King Robert II (972–1031) and Constance of Arles (986–1034). In the early-Capetian tradition, he was crowned at the Cathedral of Reims on 14 May 1027, while his father still lived. He had little influence and power until he became sole ruler on his father's death four years later.

The reign of Henry I, like those of his predecessors, was marked by territorial struggles. Initially, he joined his younger brother Robert, with the support of their mother, in a revolt against his father (1025). His mother, however, supported Robert as heir to the old king, on whose death Henry was left to deal with his rebel sibling. In 1032, he placated his brother by giving him the Duchy of Burgundy as an appanage, which their father Robert II originally gave to Henry in 1016.

In an early strategic move, Henry came to the rescue of his very young nephew-in-law to be, the newly appointed Duke William of Normandy (who would go on to become William the Conqueror), to suppress a revolt by William's vassals. In 1047, Henry secured the duchy for William in their decisive victory over the vassals at the Battle of Val-ès-Dunes near Caen; however, Henry would later support the barons against William until his own death in 1060.

In 1054, William married Henry’s niece Matilda, daughter of the count of Flanders, whom Henry viewed as a threat to his throne. In 1054, and again in August 1057, Henry invaded Normandy, but lost twice at the battles of Mortemer and Varaville.

Henry had three meetings with Henry III, Holy Roman Emperor—all at Ivois. In early 1043, they met to discuss the marriage of the emperor with Agnes of Poitou, the daughter of Henry's vassal. In October 1048, the two Henries met again and signed a treaty of friendship. Their final meeting took place in May 1056 and concerned disputes over Theobald III and the County of Blois. The debate over the county became so heated that Henry accused the emperor of breach of contract and subsequently left. In 1058, Henry was selling bishoprics and abbacies, ignoring the accusations of simony and tyranny by the Papal legate Cardinal Humbert. In 1060, Henry rebuilt the Saint-Martin-des-Champs Priory just outside Paris. Despite the royal acquisition of a part of the County of Sens in 1055, the transfer of Burgundy to his brother Robert in 1032 meant that Henry I's twenty-nine-year reign saw feudal power in France reach its pinnacle.

King Henry I died on 4 August 1060 in Vitry-en-Brie, France, and was interred in the Basilica of St Denis. He was succeeded by his son, Philip I of France, and Henry's queen Anne of Kiev ruled as regent. At the time of his death, he was besieging Thimert, which had been occupied by the Normans since 1058.

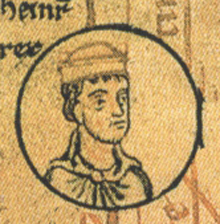
Depiction of Henry from a genealogical chart of the Ottonian dynasty in a 12th-c. manuscript

== Marriages ==
Henry I was betrothed to Matilda, the daughter of Conrad II, Holy Roman Emperor, but she died prematurely in 1034. Henry then married Matilda of Frisia, but she died in 1044. They had issue:

1. Unnamed daughter (1040 - 1044), she and her mother died only weeks apart in 1044

Casting further afield in search of a third wife, Henry married Anne of Kiev on 19 May 1051. They had:

1. Philip I (c. 1052 – 30 July 1108).
2. Emma (1054 – 1109?)
3. Robert (d. 1060).
4. Hugh "the Great" of Vermandois (1057–1101).

Henry and Anne of Kiev are additionally said to have been the parents of the beatified figure Edigna.

== Sources ==
- Bradbury, Jim (2007). The Capetians: The History of a Dynasty. Bloomsbury Publishing.
- Brown, R. Allen (1969). The Normans and the Norman Conquest. Boydell Press.
- Clark, William W. (2006). Medieval Cathedrals. Greenwood Publishing.
- Douglas, David Charles (1964). William the Conqueror: The Norman Impact Upon England. University of California Press.
- Douglas, David C (1999). William the Conqueror. Yale University Press.
- Gilbert of Mons (2005). Chronicle of Hainaut. Translated by Napran, Laura. The Boydell Press.
- Hallam, Elizabeth (1980). Capetian France 987–1328. Longman Group.
- Hallam, Elizabeth; Everard, Judith (2013). Capetian France 987–1328. Routledge.
- Raffensperger, Christian (2012). Reimagining Europe. Harvard University Press.
- Weinfurter, Stefan (1999). The Salian Century: Main Currents in an Age of Transition. University of Pennsylvania Press.
- Wolfram, Herwig (2000). Conrad II, 990–1039: Emperor of Three Kingdoms. Translated by Kaiser, Denise A. The Pennsylvania State University Press.
- Zey, Claudia (2008). "Frauen und Töchter der salischen Herrscher, Zum Wandel salischer Heiratspolitik in der Krise". In Struve, Tilman (ed.). Die Salier, das Reich und der Niederrhein (in German). Böhlau Verlag GmbH & Cie.

Henry I of France House of Capet Born: 4 May 1008 Died: 4 August 1060
Regnal titles
Preceded by Robert the Pious	King of the Franks; 1027–1060 with Robert II as senior king (1027–1031); Philip I as junior king (1059–1060)	Succeeded by Philip I
Preceded by Robert the Pious	Duke of Burgundy; 1016–1032	Succeeded by Robert the Old
