= Obrestad =

Village in Hå Municipality, Norway

- Village
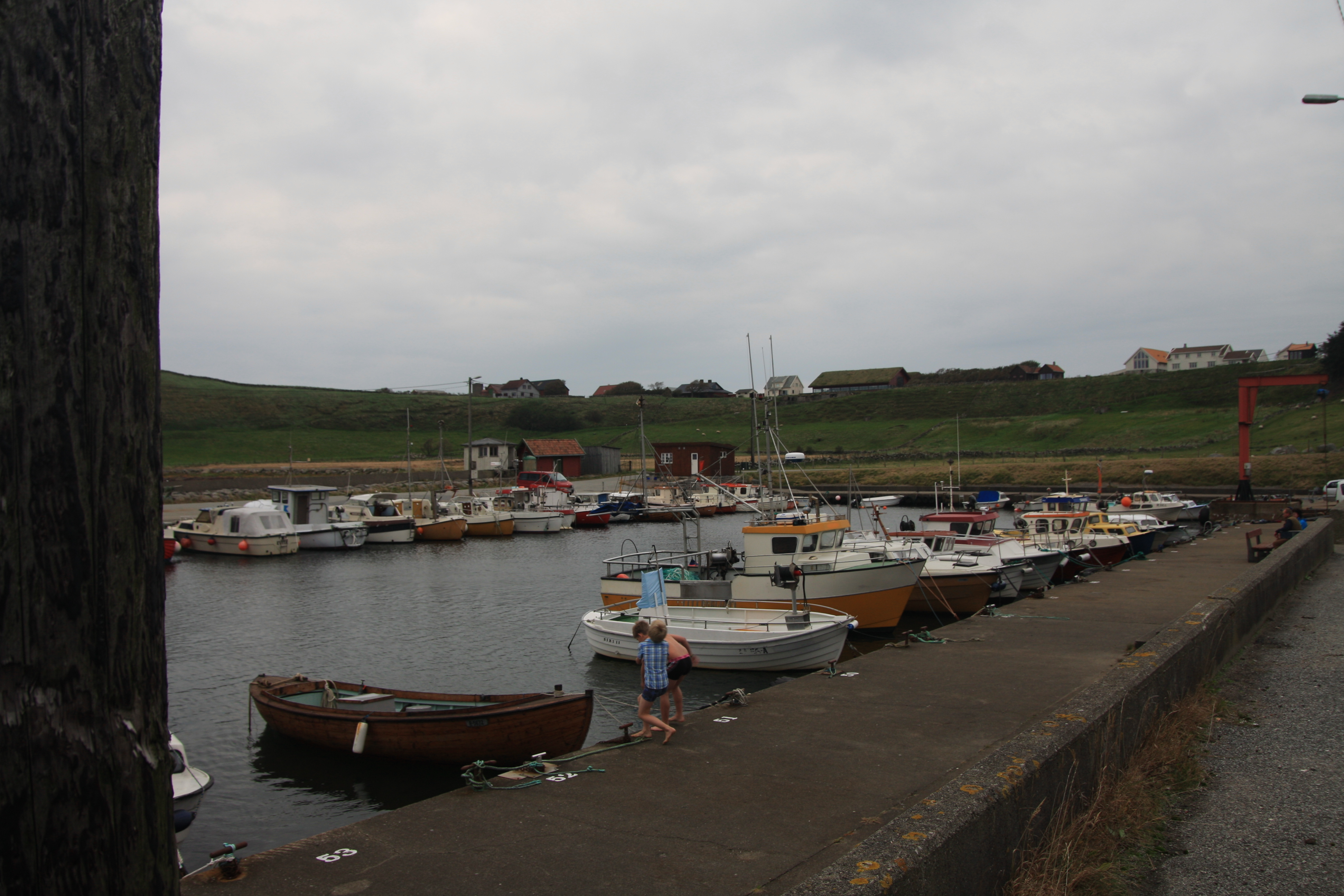
- View of the village harbour
- Interactive map of Obrestad
- Coordinates: 58.65555°N 5.5682°E
- Country: Norway
- Region: Western Norway
- County: Rogaland
- District: Jæren
- Municipality: Hå Municipality
- Elevation: 24 m (79 ft)
- Time zone: UTC+01:00 (CET)
  - Summer (DST): UTC+02:00 (CEST)
- Post Code: 4365 Nærbø

Obrestad is a very small farming village in Hå Municipality in Rogaland county, Norway. The village is located in the district of Jæren on the shore of the North Sea, about 4 kilometres (2.5 mi) west of the larger village of Nærbø.

A harbour was constructed in Obrestad in 1874 and it is still in use. The Obrestad Lighthouse was built in 1873, about 900 metres (3,000 ft) northwest of the harbour.

A sea rescue station for seafarers was established at Obrestad in 1854. It was in use until 1977.

== History ==
Local landowner Eirik Bjodaskalle, who lived around 950 AD, is said to have had his large farm at Obrestad. Eirik Bjodaskalle was the father of Queen Astrid, the mother of the famous Viking King Olaf Tryggvason. Snorri Sturluson chronicles this in the Saga of King Olaf Tryggvason which is part of Heimskringla. Obrestad was the place where Astrid and Olaf had to seek refuge before heading east.

== Obrestad surname ==
Many families that lived in Obrestad over the centuries took Obrestad as their surname including:

- Tor Obrestad (1938–2020), a contemporary writer
- Annette Obrestad (born 1988), a poker player

Other notable people from Obrestad include Astrid Eiriksdotter, 10th-century Queen of Viken.

== Climate ==
Climate data for Obrestad Lighthouse 1991-2020 (24 m)
Month	Jan	Feb	Mar	Apr	May	Jun	Jul	Aug	Sep	Oct	Nov	Dec	Year
Mean daily maximum °C (°F)	4.5 (40.1)	3.9 (39.0)	5.2 (41.4)	8.4 (47.1)	11.5 (52.7)	14 (57)	16.8 (62.2)	17.6 (63.7)	15.1 (59.2)	11.4 (52.5)	7.9 (46.2)	5.5 (41.9)	10.2 (50.3)
Daily mean °C (°F)	2.8 (37.0)	2 (36)	3.1 (37.6)	5.9 (42.6)	9.1 (48.4)	11.7 (53.1)	14.3 (57.7)	15.1 (59.2)	12.9 (55.2)	9.2 (48.6)	5.9 (42.6)	3.6 (38.5)	8.0 (46.4)
Mean daily minimum °C (°F)	0.4 (32.7)	−0.3 (31.5)	1 (34)	3.4 (38.1)	6.5 (43.7)	9.5 (49.1)	12.2 (54.0)	12.7 (54.9)	10.6 (51.1)	6.9 (44.4)	3.6 (38.5)	1.1 (34.0)	5.6 (42.2)
Average precipitation mm (inches)	132 (5.2)	100 (3.9)	88 (3.5)	67 (2.6)	64 (2.5)	67 (2.6)	88 (3.5)	127 (5.0)	130 (5.1)	155 (6.1)	152 (6.0)	130 (5.1)	1,309 (51.5)
Average precipitation days (≥ 1 mm)	15.0	11.2	13.3	11.2	11.5	10.7	11.4	13.9	16.6	17.5	18.3	16.6	167.2
Source 1: yr.no/Norwegian Meteorological Institute (mean, precipitation]
Source 2: NOAA-WMO averages 91-2020 Norway
