= Gunnhildr Sveinsdóttir =

Queen of Sweden c.1022–1050

Gunnhildr

Queen consort of Sweden
- Tenure: c. 1022–c. 1050

Queen consort of Denmark
- Tenure: 1050–1052
- Born: Norway
- Died: c. 1060; Gudhem, Västergötland, Sweden
- Burial: Gudhem, Västergötland, Sweden
- Spouse: Anund Jacob of Sweden; Sweyn II of Denmark
- Issue: Gyda, Queen of Denmark (?)
- House: House of Hlaðir
- Father: Sveinn Hákonarson
- Mother: Holmfrid of Sweden

Gunnhildr Sveinsdóttir or Gunnhildr Haraldsdóttir, Guda or Gyda (traditionally died in Gudhem, Västergötland, Sweden, c. 1060) was, according to the traditional view, a queen consort of King Anund Jacob of Sweden and of king Sveinn II of Denmark. However, the sources are so vague that several modern historians maintain that there were actually two queens of that name, of Sweden and Denmark respectively. She is sometimes called Gude or Gyridje, but this is probably because of confusion with her daughter, Gyda, who is also known under her mother's name Gunnhildr.

== Background ==
According to Snorri Sturluson's Heimskringla (c. 1230) and the Knýtlinga saga (1250s) she was the child of the Norwegian jarl Svein Håkonsson and Holmfrid, daughter (or sister) of king Olof Skötkonung and sister (or niece) of king Emund the Old of Sweden. Gunnhildr's sister Sigrid was married to the grandee Aslak Erlingsson in Jaederen.

== Queen of Sweden ==
Svein Håkonsson held part of Norway as fief under Olof Skötkonung. In 1015 he was defeated by the claimant Olaf Haraldsson (Olaf the Saint) and was forced to flee to Sweden with his family. From the near-contemporary chronicle of Adam of Bremen it is known that a Gunnhildr became married to Olof Skötkonung's son and successor King Anund Jacob (1022-c. 1050) at an unknown date. The information is found in a scholion which says: "Gunnhildr, the widow of Anund, is not the same person as Gyda, whom Thora killed". The scholion refers to a passage in Adam's main text which describes Gunnhildr as residing in Sweden in c. 1056, after her marriage with Sveinn II of Denmark ended. On the basis of this scholion it was common in older history writing to identify the Swedish and Danish Queen Gunnhildr with each other. This has been denied by historian Sture Bolin, who, basing himself on a close reading of Adam's text, regards them as two different individuals, of whom the Danish queen was Svein Håkonsson's daughter. Two later scholars, Tore Nyberg and Carl Hallencreutz, have suggested that Gunnhildr may actually have been married to both Anund Jacob and Sveinn II.

Contemporary sources do not mention any children of Gunnhildr and Anund Jacob. However, the later Danish chronicler Saxo Grammaticus and the Icelandic annals say that "the Swedish king", by implication Anund Jacob, had a daughter by the name of Gyda, sometimes also called Guda or Gunnhildr. It is possible that Gyda was the daughter of Anund by another woman, and that Gunnhildr was her stepmother. However, Saxo and the Icelandic annals are both late sources, and information about Gyda's parentage may ultimately go back to a misinterpretation of Adam of Bremen's text. Gyda was, according to Adam, married to king Sveinn II of Denmark, who had spent some time at the Swedish court during his political exile from Denmark, in about 1047. However, she soon died in 1048/49, allegedly poisoned by Sveinn's concubine Thora.

== Queen of Denmark ==
King Anund Jacob died in c. 1050. If the two Gunnhildrs were really one and the same person, the Queen Dowager went to Denmark and married her (step-)daughter's widower, her former son-in-law King Sveinn Estridsson of Denmark. According to the Annales Lundensis the marriage was concluded in 1052. To quote Adam of Bremen, "When things went well for him, he soon forgot the heavenly king and brought as his wife a kinswoman from Sweden. The Archbishop [of Hamburg-Bremen] was highly displeased with this." The couple had a son called Sveinn, but the marriage did not last long; the church considered the marriage illegal because they were too closely related – either because they were cousins, or because Sveinn had been married to her daughter – and they were threatened with excommunication if they did not separate. At first Sveinn was furious and threatened to ravage the Archbishopric of Hamburg, but the Archbishop persisted in his demand. When finally Pope Leo IX dispatched a written request, Sveinn found reason to yield and gave his queen a letter of divorce. Gunhild was thereby forced to return to Sweden, in c. 1051/52. Gunnhildr and her daughter's marriage with Sveinn have also been confused with each other in later historiography.

== Later life ==
After her involuntary divorce, Gunnhildr returned to her estates in Sweden, perhaps in Västergötland. Adam of Bremen calls her Sanctissima and describes her hospitality toward the missionary bishop Adalvard, who had been turned away from a Thing by King Emund the Old. Adam tells that Adalvard was escorted to the queen's residence over mountainous terrain by the king's kinsman Stenkil, possibly from the Mälaren Valley to Västergötland. She devoted her time to "hospitality and other pious work".

Nothing more is known of Gunnhildr from contemporary sources. According to the unreliable 16th-century chronicle of Johannes Magnus she spent her remaining days in pious repentance for her sins and religious acts. The chronicle reports that she founded a studio of the making of textiles and habits for clerical use. Her most known work was a choir gown she made for the cathedral of Roskilde. According to Johannes Magnus she founded the convent of Gudhem Abbey in the mid-11th century. In reality, however, this convent was founded exactly one hundred years later (in 1152). The legend of the convent might have come about because she and her women lived an isolated religious life making church robes on her estates, one of which could have been Gudhem. Tradition says she died in Gudhem, where she had "shown so much virtue" during her set-back, and was buried under a gravestone shaped to her likeness.

The years of her birth and death are not known, but she survived her first husband (d. c. 1050) and lived during the reign of king Emund the Old of Sweden (reign c. 1050–c. 1060). She therefore died around 1060 or later.

== Literature ==
- Adam av Bremen (1984), Historien om Hamburgstiftet och dess biskopar. Stockholm: Proprius. Libris 7604979. ISBN 91-7118-447-3
- Blomberg, Assar (1916), Några anteckningar om Gudhems Församling i Västergötland (Some notes of the congregation of Gudhem in Västergötland). A J Lindgrens Boktryckeri.
- Gillingstam, Hans, ”Gunhild”, Svenskt biografiskt lexikon Accessed 27 November 2012.
- Henrikson, Alf (1989), Dansk historia (Danish history). Stockholm: Bonnier.

Gunnhildr House of Hlaðir
Royal titles
Preceded by Estrid	Queen consort of Sweden c. 1022–c. 1050	Succeeded by Astrid Njalsdóttir
Preceded by Gyda	Queen consort of Denmark; 1050–1052	Succeeded by Margareta Hasbjörnsdóttir
