= Tryggvaflokkr =

Tryggvaflokkr (the "Flokkr-poem of Tryggvi") was an Old Norse poem about Tryggve the Pretender, an 11th-century Viking chieftain who purported to be the son of Olaf Tryggvason and tried to conquer Norway in 1033. It is usually attributed to Sighvat Thordarson, a skald and court poet of Canute the Great. The only surviving portion of the poem is that quoted by Snorri Sturluson in the Heimskringla:

For fame eager, forth fared
from the north King Tryggve,
whilst Svein from the south forth
sailed to join the battle
From fray not far was I.
Fast they raised their banners
Swiftly then-rang sword 'gainst
sword-began the bloodshed.
