= Anne of Kiev =

Queen of France from 1051 to 1060

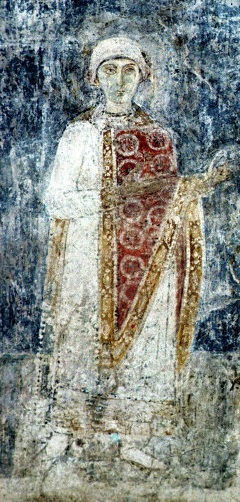

Queen consort of the Franks
- Tenure: 19 May 1051 – 4 August 1060
- Coronation: 19 May 1051

Regent of France
- Regency: 1060–1066
- Monarch: Philip I
- Co-regent: Baldwin V of Flanders
- Born: c. 1030
- Died: 5 September c.1075
- Spouses: Henry I of France; Ralph IV of Valois
- Issue more...: Philip I of France; Hugh I of Vermandois
- Dynasty: Rurik
- Father: Yaroslav the Wise
- Mother: Ingegerd Olofsdotter
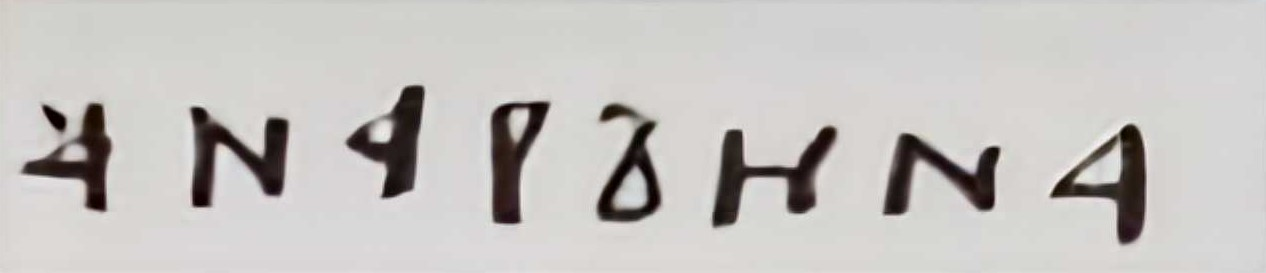
- Signature: Inscription of Anne's name in a charter of 1063

Anne of Kiev or Anna Yaroslavna (Note: Russian and Ukrainian: Анна Ярославна) (c. 1030 – 1075) was a princess of Kievan Rus who became Queen of France in 1051 upon marrying King Henry I. She ruled the kingdom as regent during the minority of their son Philip I from Henry's death in 1060 until her controversial marriage to Count Ralph IV of Valois. Anne founded the Abbey of St. Vincent at Senlis.

== Childhood ==
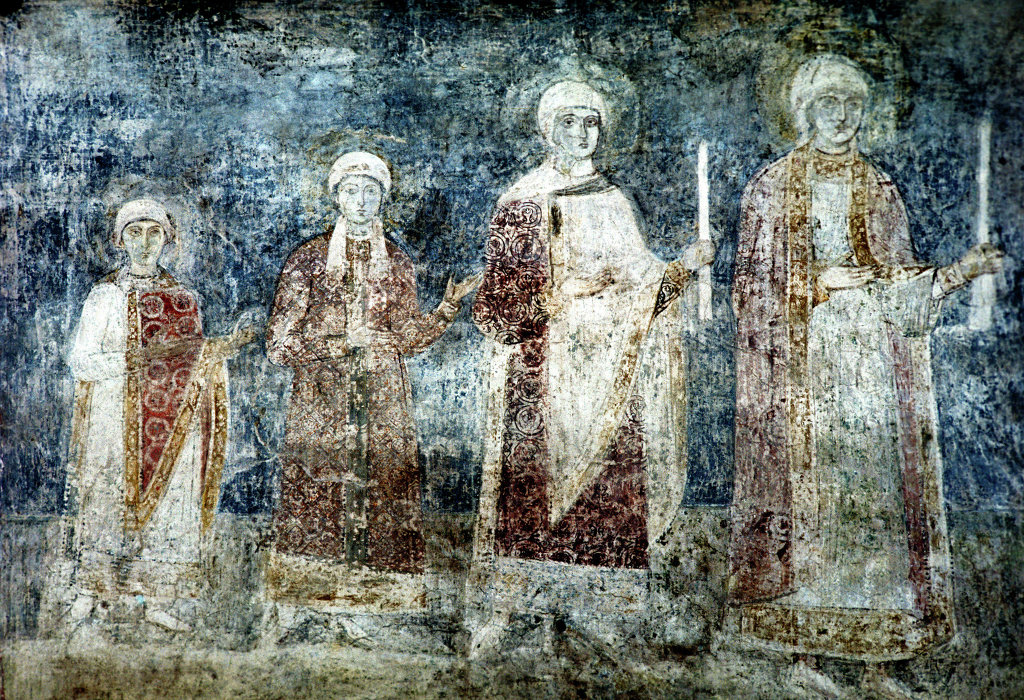
Art historian Victor Lazarev presumed that the left-most figure on this fresco at Saint Sophia's Cathedral, Kyiv, represented Anne. According to historian Robert-Henri Bautier, it depicts one of her brothers.

Anne was a daughter of Yaroslav the Wise, Grand Prince of Kiev and Prince of Novgorod, and his second wife Ingegerd Olofsdotter of Sweden. Her exact birthdate is unknown; Philippe Delorme has suggested 1027, while Andrew Gregorovich has proposed 1032, citing a mention in a Kievan chronicle of the birth of a daughter to Yaroslav in that year.

Anne's exact place in the birth order of her siblings is unknown, although she was almost certainly the youngest daughter. Little is known about Anne's childhood or education. It is assumed that she was literate, at least enough to write her name, because her signature in Cyrillic exists on a document from 1061. Delorme has pointed out that Yaroslav founded a number of schools in his kingdom and suggests that education was highly valued in his family, leading him to propose a significant level of education for Anne. Gregorovich has suggested that Anne learned French in preparation for her marriage to King Henry I of France.

== Engagement ==
The negotiations for Anne's marriage to the 18-years-older King Henry took place in the late 1040s, after the death of Henry's first wife, Matilda of Frisia, and their only child. Due to the pressing need for an heir, and the Church's growing disapproval of consanguineous marriages, it became necessary for Henry to seek an unrelated bride. The Kievan Rus' were not unknown to the French. Yaroslav had married several of his children to Western rulers in an attempt to avoid the influence of the Byzantine Empire.

In the autumn of 1049 or the spring of 1050, Henry sent Bishop Gauthier of Meaux, Goscelin of Chauny, and other unnamed advisors to Yaroslav's court. It is possible that there were two diplomatic missions to the Rus at this time, with Roger of Chalons also present. No record of the marriage negotiations or the dowry arrangements survives, although Anne reportedly left Kiev with "rich presents". Gregorovich claims that part of the wealth she brought to France included the jacinth jewel that Abbot Suger later mounted on a reliquary of St. Denis. Anne left Kiev in the summer or fall of 1050 and traveled to Reims.

== Queenship ==
Anne married Henry on 19 May 1051, during the feast of Pentecost. Henry was nearly twenty years older than Anne. Her wedding on 19 May 1051 followed the installation of Lietbert as bishop of Cambrai, and Anne was crowned immediately following the marriage ceremony, making her the first French queen to celebrate her coronation in Reims Cathedral.

Anne and Henry were married for nine years and had three sons: Philip, Robert (who died young), and Hugh. Anne is often credited with introducing the Greek name "Philip" to royal families of Western Europe, as she bestowed it on her first son; she might have imported this Greek name from her Eastern Orthodox culture. There may also have been a daughter, Emma, perhaps born in 1055; it is unknown if she married or when she died. Henry and Anne of Kiev are additionally said to have been the parents of the beatified figure Edigna.

As queen, Anne would have had the privilege of participating in the royal council, but there are almost no records of her doing so. In one 1058 charter, Henry granted a privilege to a couple of villages associated with the monastery of Saint-Maur-des-Fossés doing so "with the approval of my wife Anne and our children Philip, Robert, and Hugh." Anne seems to have possessed territories in the same region under the terms of her dower.

In 1059, King Henry began feuding with the Church over issues related to Gregorian Reform. During this time, Pope Nicholas II sent Queen Anne a letter counseling her to follow her conscience to right wrongs and intervene against oppressive violence, while also encouraging her to advocate with her husband so that he might govern with moderation. According to Delorme, some historians have interpreted this letter from the Pope as being indicative of Anne's conversion to Roman Catholicism from Eastern Orthodoxy.

== Regency ==
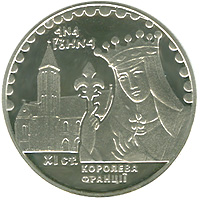
Anne as portrayed on a 2014 Ukrainian coin

Upon Henry's death on 4 August 1060, Philip succeeded to the throne. Count Baldwin V of Flanders, the husband of Henry's sister Adela, was assigned as Philip's guardian. Anne may still have played an active role in government at that point; an act from 1060 shows her name following Philip's, and her name appears in four times as many charters as Baldwin's. She also hired Philip's tutor, who was known at court by a Greek title.

Queen Anne's only existing signature dates from this period; it appears inscribed on a document issued at Soissons for the abbot of Saint Crepin le Grand, now held in the National Library of France. The signature was most likely placed by a Rus' assistant of the Queen. Under the king's rubric, there is a cross and eight letters in Cyrillic, probably meaning "Ana Reina", the contemporaneous French for "Queen Anne".

Evidence for Anne's role in government, however, disappears in 1061, around the time she remarried. Her second husband was Count Ralph IV of Valois. This marriage was controversial because of the couple's affinity (as Ralph was Henry's cousin), and it constituted bigamy, since Ralph was still technically married to his second wife, Haquenez. Ralph was excommunicated for these transgressions. King Philip's advisers may have encouraged him to turn away from his mother, perhaps mistrusting Ralph's influence. Ralph began referring to himself as the king's stepfather in the late 1060s. He died in 1074, leaving Anne a widow once again.

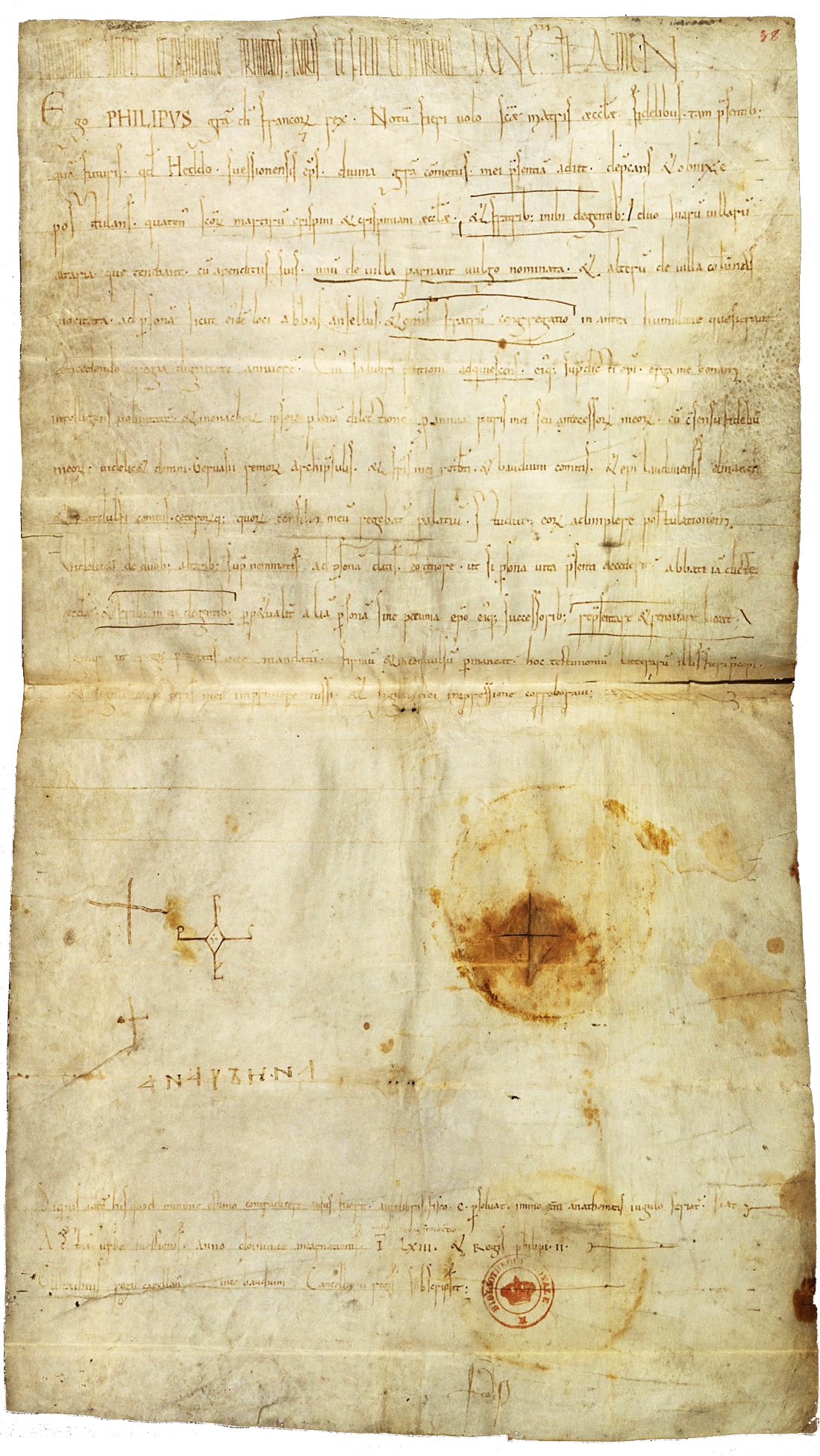
A charter signed on behalf of Anne and her son Philip in 1063

In 1062, Anne gave a significant amount of money to restore a dilapidated chapel at Senlis, originally dedicated to Saint Vincent of Saragossa. She bequeathed lands and income to the new establishment so that the organization could sustain itself. She also wrote a letter explaining her reasons for dedicating the monastery. The letter betrays adherence to Greek Orthodox theology. For instance, the term "Mary, mother of God" is used rather than the more common "Our Lady", perhaps referring to the Eastern concept of the Theotokos. Some scholars believe that Anne did not write this letter herself.

== Death ==
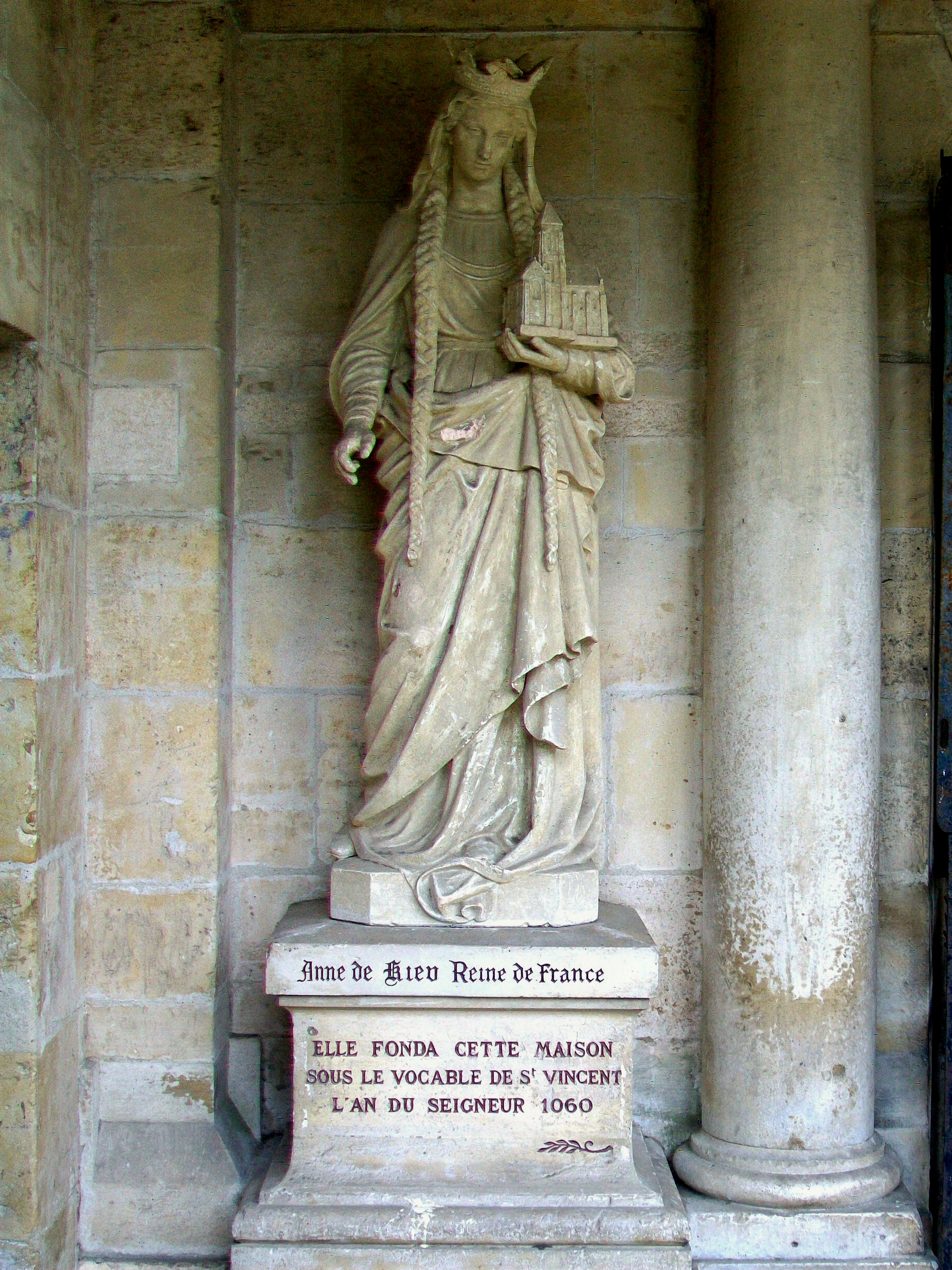
Statue of Anne at the Abbey of Saint-Vincent (2011)

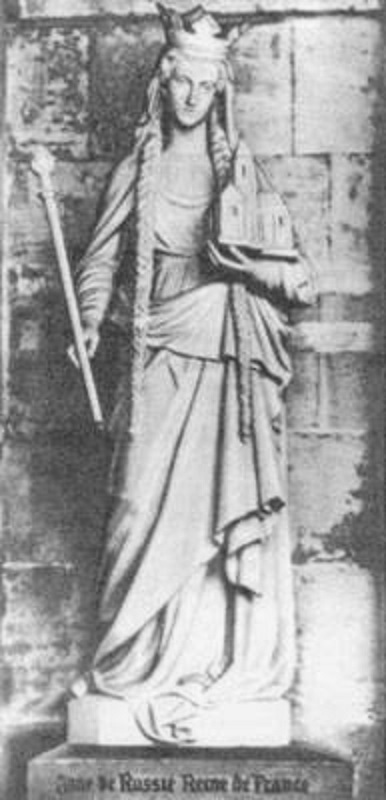
Statue of Anne at the Abbey of Saint-Vincent before renovation with change of inscription in 1996

The exact date of Anne's death is unknown. Delorme believes that she died on 5 September—the day commemorated at Senlis—in 1075 (the year of her last signed document), while others have proposed 1080. A terminus ante quem is provided by a 1089 document of Philip I, which indicates that Anne had died by then.

In 1682, the Jesuit antiquary Claude-Francois Menestrier announced that he had discovered Anne's tomb at the Cistercian Abbey of Villiers. The discovery was subsequently disputed, as Villiers was not built until the thirteenth century, although it's possible Anne's remains had been moved there at some point following her death. Whatever monument may have been there was destroyed in the French Revolution.

== Legacy ==
In the 18th and 19th centuries, increased diplomatic contact between France and Russia led to a revived antiquarian interest in Anne, and a number of short biographies were published. In the 20th century, Anne became a symbol of Ukrainian nationalism. On the other hand, a film was produced in the Soviet Union, "Yaroslavna, the Queen of France" (1978), which was not related with "Ukrainian nationalism" in any way. An opera called "Anna Yaroslavna", written by Antin Rudnytsky, was first performed at Carnegie Hall in 1969. In 1998, the Ukrainian government issued a postage stamp in her honour. In 2005, the Government of Ukraine sponsored the construction of a bronze statue of Queen Anne at Senlis, which was unveiled by President Viktor Yushchenko on 22 June.

In May 2017, during a visit to France for a meeting with French President Emmanuel Macron at the Palace of Versailles, Russian President Vladimir Putin invoked Anne as an origin point of Russian–French relations, referring to her as "Russian Anna". The characterization drew public objections from Ukraine: the country's official Twitter account replied, and President Petro Poroshenko accused Russia of attempting to appropriate historical figures of Kyivan Rus for its own history. In 2024, the 155th Mechanized Brigade of the Ukrainian Ground Forces — formed, equipped, and trained with French assistance, and announced by President Macron at the 80th anniversary of the Normandy landings — was named the "Anne of Kyiv" Brigade in her honor.

== Notes ==
French royalty
| Vacant Title last held by Matilda of Frisia | Queen consort of France; 1051–1060 | Vacant Title next held by Bertha of Holland |
