= Tryggvi the Pretender =

Viking chieftain

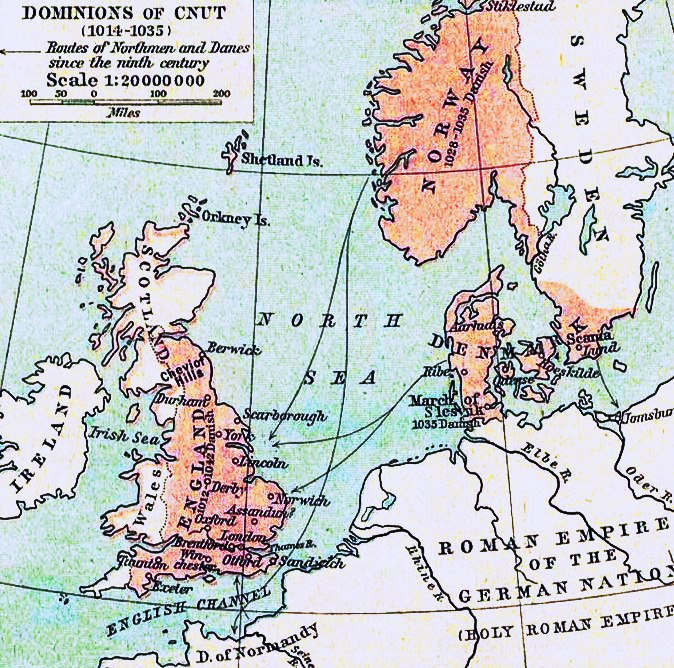
Map of Northern Europe at the time of Tryggve.

Tryggvi "the Pretender" (Old Norse Tryggvi Ólafsson, Norwegian Tryggve Olavsson) was a Viking chieftain who lived in the early eleventh century, and came from "west across the sea" (probably from the Norse settlements in England and Ireland). His story appears in Heimskringla by Snorri Sturluson, the saga Morkinskinna, and a saga composed by Oddr Snorrason on Olaf Tryggvason.

== Invasion of Norway ==
According to Heimskringla, in 1033, during the lordship of Cnut the Great's son Svein over Norway, Tryggvi invaded Norway. He claimed to be the son of Olaf Tryggvason and his wife Gyda. His enemies scoffed at this claim, asserting that Tryggvi was instead the bastard son of a priest; however, Snorri Sturluson refers to Olaf's relatives in Viken as Tryggvi's "kinsmen;" moreover, the author of Morkinskinna has Harald Hardrada asserting kinship with the then-deceased Tryggvi, indicating that at least some people believed Tryggvi's claim.

When word reached Svein and his mother Ælfgifu of Northampton that Tryggvi's invasion was imminent, they summoned the landholders of Hålogaland and the Trondheim district to join the royal army in resisting Tryggvi. The jarl Einar Thambarskelfir, angered by the policies of Cnut's government, remained at home and refused to fight for Svein. Likewise, neither the powerful landowner Kálfr Árnason nor any of his brothers would fight for Svein.

Svein and his forces made their way south to Agder, believing that Tryggvi would attempt to slip through the Skagerrak and join his supporters in Viken. Tryggvi, however, landed instead in Hordaland, then sailed to Rogaland to attack Svein's navy. The two fleets met off the island of Vestre Bokn, where only a few years before Erling Skjalgsson had been defeated and killed.

During the battle, according to reports recorded by Snorri, Tryggvi hurled javelins at his enemies with both hands simultaneously, a feat for which Olaf Tryggvason had been known. He famously exclaimed "Thus did my father teach me to say mass," simultaneously asserting his descent from King Olaf and mocking his enemies' allegation that his father was a priest. Despite his celebrated resourcefulness, Tryggvi's forces were overwhelmed by Svein's fleet and Tryggvi himself was killed.

An account preserved in Morkinskinna relates that Tryggvi was actually killed by a farmer after the battle. Many years later, when Harald Hardrada was king of Norway, he passed by the site of the battle. The king met an old friend of his who pointed out the alleged assassin. After questioning the purported killer and hearing him confess, King Harald had the man hanged, citing the familial bond between him and Tryggvi and his duty to avenge the latter's death.

== Heimskringla ==
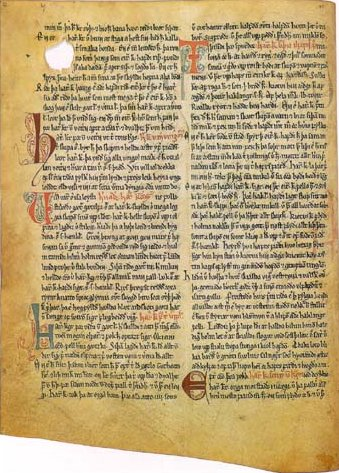
A manuscript page of Heimskringla.

A famous poem, Tryggvaflokkr, was written about Tryggvi. Excerpts of the poem, usually attributed to Canute's court poet Sighvat Thordarson, were preserved in Heimskringla:

For fame eager, forth fared
from the north King Tryggvi,
whilst Sveinn from the south forth
sailed to join the battle
From fray not far was I.
Fast they raised their banners
Swiftly then-rang sword 'gainst
sword-began the bloodshed.

Another poem recorded in Heimskringla, by an unknown skald, mentions the battle against Tryggvi:

That Sunday morning, maiden,
much unlike it was to
days when at wassail women
wait on men with ale-drink
when Sveinn the sailors bade his
sloops of war to fasten
by their bows, with carrion
battening hungry ravens.

== Sources ==
- Gade, Kari (trans.) (2000). Morkinskinna : The Earliest Icelandic Chronicle of the Norwegian Kings (1030-1157). Cornell University Press.
- Hollander, Lee (trans.) (2002). Heimskringla: History of the Kings of Norway. University of Texas Press.
- Jones, Gwyn (2001). A History of the Vikings. Oxford Univ. Press, USA.
- Sephton, John (trans.) (1895). The Saga of King Olaf Tryggwason. D. Nutt.
