= Edigna =

Beatified figure in the Catholic Church

Blessed Edigna
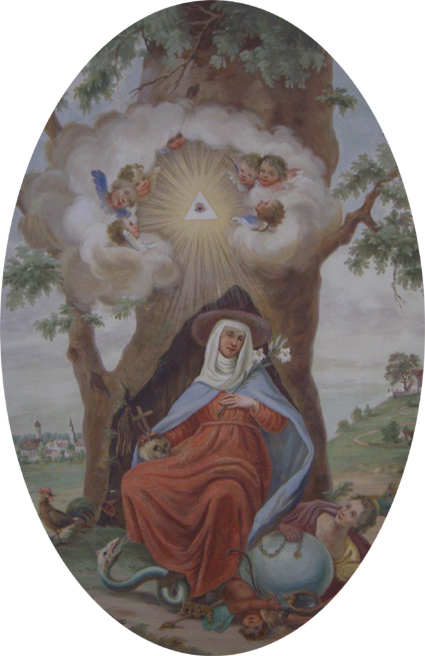
- Ceiling fresco depicting Edigna at St. Sebastian Church in Puch
- Born: c. 1055
- Died: 26 February 1109; Puch, Fürstenfeldbruck, Germany
- Parents: Henry I of France; Anna of Kiev

Edigna (c. 1055–1109) is a venerated figure in Puch, and is beatified in the Catholic Church. Her historical existence is debated.

== Legend ==
According to legend, Edigna was a daughter of Henry I of France and Anne of Kiev, and was born c. 1055. In 1074, at the age of 19, she fled to Bavaria on a farmer's bullock cart to escape an arranged marriage. The farmer stopped in Puch, Fürstenfeldbruck, where a rooster in the cart crowed and a bell rang. Edigna took this as a sign that she should leave the cart. She remained in Puch until her death on 26 February, 1109, living as a hermit in a hollowed-out linden tree and revered by the people as a miracle worker. She did not reveal her royal background, but it was discovered after her death. When she died, holy oil flowed from the tree, but it dried up when attempts were made to sell it.

Edigna has been venerated since her death, and regarded as the patroness saint of Puch.

== Historical evidence ==
=== In support ===
In 1347, a document related to the death of Louis IV near Puch contained the first known written mention of Edigna. In 1624, Matthäus Rader examined her corpse and subsequently wrote a biography of her. Edigna was beatified in the Catholic Church in 1600. In 1976, a grave in the church was discovered, which could have been the burial site of Edigna.

A 1639 votive tablet describes a child from Mammendorf who recovered from an illness immediately after completing a pilgrimage to the site.

=== Against ===
Henry I of France and Anne of Kiev are known to have had four children, named Phillip, Robert, Hugo, and Emma. However, Emma and Edigna may be the same person, because few details about Emma are known.

== In the modern day ==
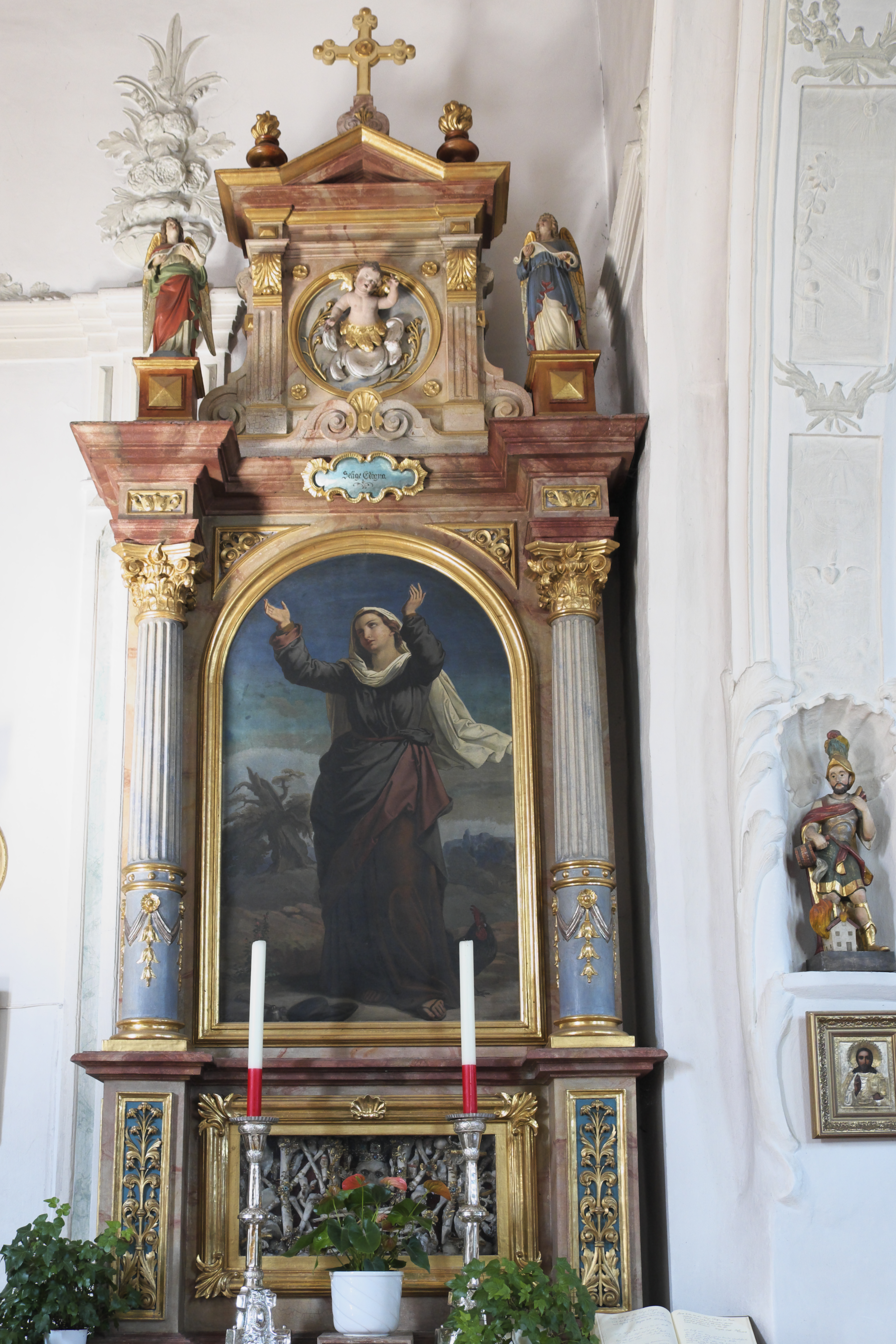
Altar depicting Edigna at the Church of St. Sebastian in Puch

A street in Puch called the Edignaweg leads past the local Church of St. Sebastian, in which an altar is dedicated to Edigna, and past a linden tree.

Ukrainians often make pilgrimages to Puch because Edigna's mother, Anne of Kiev, was from Ukraine. In 2007, Viktor Yushchenko made such a visit while President of Ukraine. An Edigna Association and decennial Edigna Games exist in Puch. As of January 2021, three women in Puch were named Edigna, while eight others had it as their middle name. In Wörth an der Donau, Edigna is venerated by a church called the Church of St. Edigna.

She is depicted in a stained glass window in the Frauenkirche, Munich.

Edigna is considered to be the patroness saint of Puch and a patroness against cattle diseases and theft.

=== The Edignalinde ===
A linden tree in Puch called the Edignalinde, said to be the same tree in which Edigna lived, is near the town cemetery. Julius Langbehn, a German nationalist and antisemite who admired Edigna, was buried near the tree in 1907 at his own request; a nearby street is also named after him.
