= Edla =

Medieval Slavic woman

Edla (10th–11th century) was a Slavic woman during the Viking Age. She was the mother of King Emund of Sweden and Queen Astrid of Norway.

According to tradition, Edla was the daughter of a Lechitic tribal chief who ruled the region between the Oder and Elbe rivers, in what is now Mecklenburg-Vorpommern. She was brought to Sweden as a prisoner of war sometime between 995 and 1000, likely before the arrival of Estrid of the Obotrites (Estrid av obotriterna).

King Olof Skötkonung took Edla as his concubine. Later, he married Estrid. Edla became the mother of Emund, Astrid, and likely Holmfrid. Snorre Sturlasson notes that her children were sent to foster parents away from the royal court because Queen Estrid was unkind to them. This may suggest that Edla died while her children were still young.

== Children ==
- Emund the Old, King of Sweden
- Astrid Olofsdotter, married King Olav II of Norway
- Holmfrid, wife of Sven Ladejarl

== Sources ==
- Ohlmarks, Åke Alla Sveriges drottningar
- Lagerqvist, Lars O. Sverige och dess regenter under 1.000 år (Albert Bonniers Förlag AB, 1982) ISBN 91-0-075007-7.
