= Olof Skötkonung =

King of Sweden from c. 995 to 1022

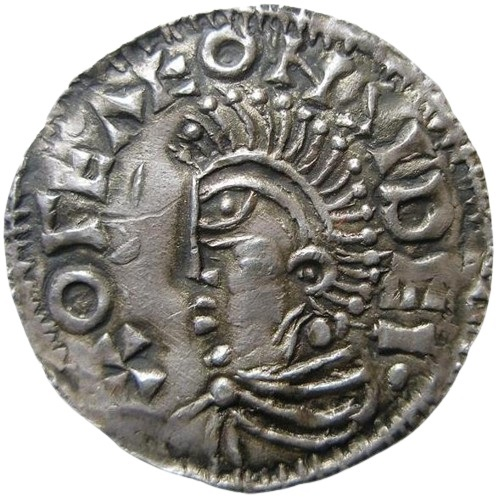
- Coin minted for King Olof in Sigtuna

King of Sweden
- Reign: c. 995–1022
- Predecessor: Erik the Victorious
- Successor: Anund Jacob
- Born: c. 980
- Died: 1022 (aged 41–42)
- Spouse: Estrid of the Obotrites
- Issue: Anund Jacob, King of Sweden; Ingegerd, Grand Princess of Kiev; Illegitimate: Emund the Old; Astrid, Queen of Norway
- House: Munsö
- Father: Erik the Victorious
- Mother: Sigríð Storråda/Świętosława?
- Religion: Chalcedonian Christianity; previously Norse paganism

Olof Skötkonung (Old Norse: Óláfr skautkonungr; c. 980 – 1022), sometimes stylized as Olaf the Swede, was King of Sweden, son of Eric the Victorious and, according to Icelandic sources, Sigrid the Haughty. He succeeded his father in c. 995. He is the first Swedish ruler about whom there is substantial knowledge. He is regarded as the first king known to have ruled both the Swedes and the Geats, and the first king in Sweden to have minted coins. In Sweden, the reign of Olof Skötkonung is considered to mark the transition from the Viking Age to the Middle Ages. He was the first Christian king in central Sweden. Norse beliefs persisted in parts of Sweden until the 12–13th century, with some keeping the tradition into modern times.

Olof and the Danish king Sweyn Forkbeard formed an alliance and defeated the Norwegian king Olaf Tryggvason in the Battle of Svolder in 999 or 1000. After the battle, the victorious leaders split Norway into areas of control. Heimskringla gives a detailed account of the division. Olof received four districts in Trondheim as well as Møre, Romsdal and Rånrike.

== Etymology ==
One of many explanations for the name Skötkonung is that it is derived from the Swedish word "skatt", which can mean either "taxes" or "treasure". The historians Niels Lund and Peter Sawyer state that Skötkonung means "tributary king", implying that Olof acknowledged his step-father, King Sweyn Forkbeard of Denmark, as his overlord; but in the view of Sverre Bagge the relationship between Olof and Swein is not known. Another possible explanation of the name refers to the fact that he was the first Swedish king to mint coins. An ancient land ownership ceremony which placed a parcel of earth in someone's lap (Swedish: sköte) was called scotting and may have been involved in this epithet.

The Old Norse "Óláfr sœnski" means "Olaf the Swedish", an epithet used to distinguish him from the Norwegian kings Olaf Tryggvasson and Olaf Haraldsson.

== Life ==
General knowledge of Olof's life is mostly based on Snorri Sturluson's and Adam of Bremen's accounts, which have been subject to criticism from some scholars. The eldest account by the German ecclesiastic chronicler Adam of Bremen (c. 1075), relates that Sweyn Forkbeard was expelled from his Danish realm by the Swedish King Eric the Victorious in the late 10th century. When Eric died (c. 995), Sweyn returned and regained his kingdom, marrying Eric's widow. Meanwhile, however, Olof had succeeded his father Eric, gathered an army, and launched a surprise attack against Sweyn. The Danish king was once again expelled while Olof occupied his lands. After this, however, the conflict was resolved. Since Sweyn had married Olof's mother, he was reinstated on the Danish throne and the two kings were thereafter allies. Snorri Sturluson (c. 1230) and the other Icelandic saga writers likewise say that Sweyn married Olof's mother after the death of Eric the Victorious, but without mentioning any conflict. Also, Snorri describes Sweyn and Olof as equal allies when they defeated the Norwegian king Olav Tryggvason in the battle of Svolder in 1000, and thereafter divided Norway between themselves (see below). It is commonly believed that Adam's account about Sweyn's defeats at the hands of Eric and Olof is partial and might have been misinterpreted; the marriage to Olof's mother may in fact have sealed Sweyn's senior position.

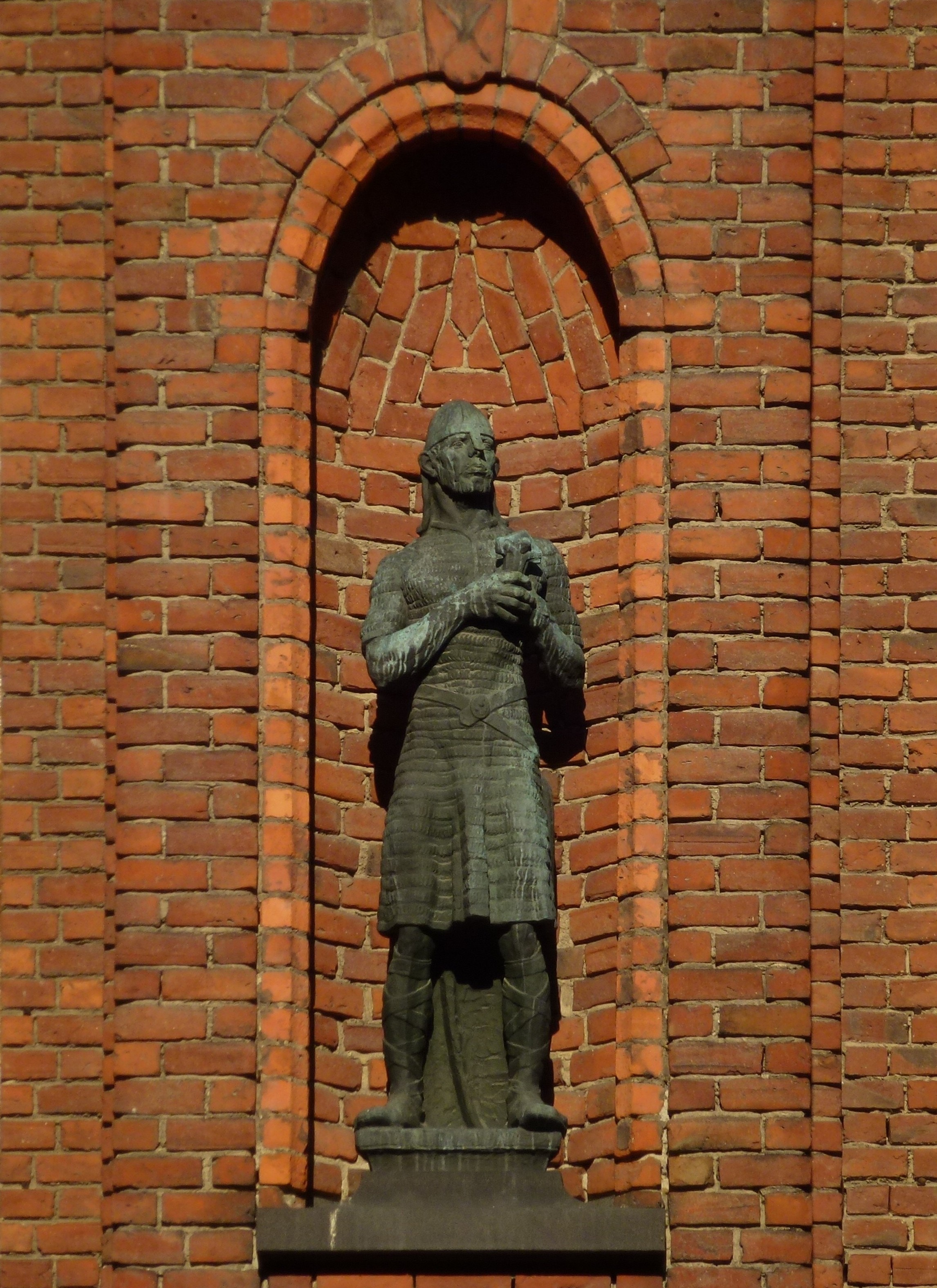
Olof Skötkonung as imagined by Ansgar Almquist in the 1920s, statue at Stockholm City Hall.

=== Viking expedition to Wendland ===
According to Snorri, Olof Skötkonung led a Viking expedition to Wendland early in his reign. He captured Edla, the daughter of a Wendish chieftain, and kept her as mistress. She gave him the son Emund (who was to become king of Sweden), and the daughters Astrid (later wife of Olaf II of Norway) and Holmfrid (married to Sven Jarl of Norway). He later married Estrid of the Obotrites, and they had a son, Anund Jacob, and a daughter, Ingegerd Olofsdotter.

=== Alliance with Sweyn Forkbeard ===
While Adam of Bremen praises Olof as a good Christian, Icelandic authors paint an unfavourable picture of the king as haughty and prickly. Olof is said to have preferred royal sports to war, which may explain the ease with which Sweyn Forkbeard retook the Danish lands Olof's father Eric had conquered. Olof may also have lost the right to tribute which his predecessors had preserved in what is now Estonia and Latvia.

In 1000, he joined forces with Sweyn Forkbeard and with the Norwegian Jarls Eric and Sven, against the Norwegian King Olaf Tryggvason. The circumstances have been much debated in modern historical research, but a contemporary poem confirms that Eric Jarl gathered auxiliaries in Sweden: "The belligerent jarl / gathered much manpower / in Svithiod, the chief went / southward to the battle." Olaf Tryggvason was attacked by the allied fleets in the Battle of Svolder, the location of which is uncertain. It may have been either in Øresund or Pomerania. Olaf Tryggvason disappeared during the battle and Norway was appropriated by the allied lords. The bulk of the conquests went to Sweyn Forkbeard while Olof gained a part of Trøndelag as well as modern Bohuslän. These lands were placed under Sven Jarl, son-in-law of the king.

=== Norwegian-Swedish War ===
When the Norwegian kingdom was reestablished by Olaf II of Norway (Olaf the Saint) in 1015, a new war erupted between Norway and Sweden. There is a circumstantial account of this in Snorri Sturluson's work. As he writes, many men in both Sweden and Norway tried to reconcile the kings. In 1018, Olof's cousin, the earl of Västergötland, Ragnvald Ulfsson and the Norwegian king's emissaries Björn Stallare and Hjalti Skeggiason had arrived at the thing of Uppsala in an attempt to sway the Swedish king to accept peace and as a warrant marry his daughter Ingegerd Olofsdotter to the king of Norway. The Swedish king was greatly angered and threatened to banish Ragnvald from his kingdom, but Ragnvald was supported by his foster-father Thorgny the Lawspeaker.

Thorgny delivered a powerful speech in which he reminded the king of the great Viking expeditions in the East that predecessors such as Erik Anundsson and Björn had undertaken, without having the hubris not to listen to their men's advice. Thorgny himself had taken part in many successful pillaging expeditions with Olof's father Eric the Victorious and even Eric had listened to his men. The present king wanted nothing but Norway, which no Swedish king before him had desired. This displeased the Swedish people, who were eager to follow the king on new ventures in the East to win back the kingdoms that paid tribute to his ancestors, but it was the wish of the people that the king make peace with the king of Norway and give him his daughter Ingegerd as queen.

Thorgny finished his speech by saying: "if you do not desire to do so, we shall assault you and kill you and not brook any more of your warmongering and obstinacy. Our ancestors have done so, who at Mula thing threw five kings in a well, kings who were too arrogant as you are against us." Upon hearing this, King Olof complied with the demands of the peasantry for the time being.

However, far from keeping his promise Olof married his daughter Ingegerd to Yaroslav I the Wise instead. When Olaf of Norway heard about the arrangement he was furious and intent on attacking Olof Skötkonung. However, the Geatish jarl Ragnvald Ulfsson, colluding with Olaf II's skald Sigvat Thordarson, managed to avert the impending war. Olof's other daughter Astrid stayed with Ragnvald at the time, and it was agreed that she would take Ingegerd's place. Unbeknownst to Olof, she traveled to Norway and married Olaf II. That happened c. 1019. Olof Skötkonung was highly upset, but soon ran into trouble at home. Both the Swedes and Geats were displeased with the self-willed rule of the king. The lawspeaker of Västergötland, Emund, traveled to Gamla Uppsala and spoke to Olof's councilors, and a settlement was made. Olof agreed to share his power with his son Anund Jacob who was 10 or 12 years at the time. Olof was also forced to accept a settlement with Olaf II of Norway at Kungahälla. The veracity of Snorri Sturluson's account of Olof Skötkonung, written more than two centuries later, is difficult to assess; however, he quotes several probably genuine scaldic verses which allude to some of the related events.

One result of the hostilities between Olof Skötkonung and Olaf of Norway was, according to Snorri Sturluson, that the people of Jämtland and Hälsingland came under the Swedish rather than Norwegian king. Previously the Jämtlanders and part of the Hälsinglanders had adhered to Norway since the days of Hakon the Good. The veracity of this is not known, but the medieval provincial laws of Jämtland show Swedish influences, and there are indications that Christianity arrived from Central Sweden in the 11th century. Jämtland reverted to the Norwegian king in 1111, while Hälsingland was henceforth under Sweden.

=== Diplomacy ===
Olof's ally Sweyn Forkbeard occupied England in 1013, but died shortly afterwards, and the Anglo-Saxon ruler Æthelred the Unready was able to return. According to Adam of Bremen, "the son of the king, Cnut, returned home with the army and prepared a new war against the English. Olav [II], whom the Norwegians had chosen as their commander, now separated from the Danish kingdom. Cnut, who felt threatened from two directions, then entered an alliance with his brother Olof Eriksson who ruled in Sweden, and planned to take power in England, and then in Norway, with his assistance. Equipped with a thousand large ships, Cnut thus traversed the British Sea". From Swedish rune stones it also appears that many people joined the Danish Viking expeditions of the early 11th century. After Cnut the Great became King of England in 1016, he sent the two sons of the deceased King Edmund Ironside to Olof (who was either Canute's half-brother or stepbrother), supposedly with instructions to have the children murdered. Instead of having them killed, the two boys were secretly sent either to Kiev, where Olof's daughter Ingigerd was the Queen, or to Poland, where Canute's uncle Bolesław I Chrobry was duke.

=== Christian King ===
Included in the Westrogothic law from c. 1240 is the first brief Swedish chronicle, which begins with Olof Skötkonung. It relates that Olof was baptized in Husaby in Västergötland by the missionary Sigfrid, and made generous donations on spot. At Husaby parish church, there is a sign commemorating his baptism; nearby is a well thought to be the same sacred spring where Olof was baptized.

He was the first Swedish king to remain a Christian until his death. However, the circumstances about his baptism are not clear. A document from 1008 says that a certain bishop, dispatched by Archbishop Bruno of Querfurt, visited the Suigi tribe and managed to baptize the king, whose queen was already Christian. One thousand people and seven communities followed his example. The Suigi have sometimes been identified as the Swedes, though this has been rejected by several other scholars. On the other hand, Olof's coinage (see below) indicates that he was a Christian already at the time of his accession in c. 995.

According to Adam of Bremen, Olof planned to tear down the Uppsala temple, which was allegedly an important cult centre. The fact that a large part of the Swedes were still pagan forced him to abandon this aim. The pagans made an agreement with Olof to the effect that he, if he wished to be a Christian, must exercise his royal authority in a province of his choice. If he founded a church, he was not supposed to force anyone to convert. Olof was content with this and installed a bishopric in the province of Västergötland, closer to Denmark and Norway. On the wishes of Olof, the Archbishop of Hamburg-Bremen anointed Thurgot as the first Bishop in Skara. This Thurgot was successful in disseminating Christianity among the West Geats and east Geats.

The legend of St. Sigfrid, known since the 13th century, relates that the still pagan Olof called in the English Archbishop of York, Sigfrid, to teach the new faith in his realm. On his way, Sigfrid and his three nephews came to Värend in southern Småland where the twelve local tribes endorsed Christianity at a Thing. Sigfrid left his nephews to tend matters in Värend and proceeded to Olof's court where the king and his family were baptised. Meanwhile, a heathen reaction in Värend cost the lives of the nephews, whose heads were sunk in the Växjö Lake. Hearing about this, Sigfrid returned to Värend where the heads were discovered through a miracle. King Olof then appeared in Värend with a force, punished the murderers, and forced the locals to yield properties to the Church. Whether the legend reflects the expansion of Olof's realm to the south is unsure. The account seems to incorporate various elements in order to legitimise the establishment of the Bishopric of Växjö in c. 1170. It is nevertheless known from Adam of Bremen that an English missionary called Sigfrid preached among the Swedes and Geats in the first half of the 11th century.

== Coinage and extent of the realm ==
Olof Skötkonung is the first king in Sweden known to have minted coins, of which a few hundred are extant and serve as contemporary source material about his reign. His son and successor Anund Jacob also minted coins, but after him the practice stopped, and the next coins minted in Sweden are by Knut Eriksson in late 12th century.

When he stamped coins in Sigtuna in the province of Uppland Olof used the word rex for king–OLUF REX as in the coin displayed above or OLAF REX. The use of Latin seems to suggest that he was already baptised at this time but on the other hand the coins were imitating English pennies in type and style. Sigtuna is written SITUN, ZINT (in the coin above), ZTNETEI, or SIDEI. The two last have been deciphered as Si(gtuna) Dei meaning God's Sigtuna. The earliest of Olof's coins merely depict him as "King in Sigtuna", while the later ones have "King of the Swedes".

It has been suggested that this change in nomenclature relates to a widening of Olof's base of power around 1000. Sigtuna may be understood as the area in Uppland ruled from the town of this name, while rulership over the Swedes may indicate a more extensive realm. Contemporary scaldic poetry indicates Olof as the ruler of the Swedes as well as the Geats (Götar), and the same goes for the account of Adam of Bremen. The exact nature of the relation between the Swedes and Geats, and the process by which a unified kingdom was created, has been intensively debated. While the unification has traditionally been thought to depart from the provinces around lake Mälaren some scholars hold that the Geatic provinces were leading the process, and that the construction of a Swedish kingdom was a long process that was only concluded in the 13th century.

== Yngvars saga víðförla ==
Olof's relations to the lands east of the Baltic are mentioned in Yngvars saga víðförla (Ingvar's Saga), which dates from the late 13th or early 14th century. Here, the Semigallians who lived around the Daugava River in present-day Latvia, are described as a tributaries of Sweden and King Olof. However, the people of Semigallia rebelled and ceased paying the taxes due to them. Olof therefore sent a Swedish force led by his son Anund and grand-nephew Ingvar the Far-Travelled and subdued the recalcitrant Semigallian chieftains through persuasion and warfare. The reliability of the saga is debated, but archaeologists have confirmed Swedish settlements from the Viking Age in the Daugava area.

According to Snorri Sturlasson's work Heimskringla, many countries in the east paid tribute to the Swedes. A section of Heimskringla, Saint Olaf's Saga, mentions that Finland, Karelia, Estonia, Courland (in Latvia) and all the countries further inland were subordinated by Olof's forefathers as clients. However, through inaction, Olof let the tributaries slip away from his realm. Adam of Bremen says that the Swedes had power over extensive lands up to the "Land of Women" (Kvenland?) and Courland. Judging from Snorri's account, the Baltic client areas may have risen up when the regular Swedish military expeditions to the Baltics stopped due to the war with Norway. This might be connected with the uprising of the Semigallians in Ingvar's Saga. Whatever influence or tributary system Olof had in the east apparently disappeared due to uprisings.

Heimskringla, supported by contemporary scaldic verses, says that the Norwegian Jarl Eric found protection with Olof Skötkonung after 995 and carried out extensive raiding in the Baltic region and ruined Aldeigjuborg to the east of present-day Saint Petersburg. In the early 11th century, the Swedish king would however have lost any dominion he possibly had over this site, even though Olof's daughter Ingegerd received Aldeigjuborg as bridal gift from Yaroslav the Wise and brought a jarl from Olof's realm to govern it. Aldeigjuborg was probably burnt in 870, and several efforts were made to reclaim Swedish glory in the east. The short-lived bestowal of Aldeigjuborg to Olof's daughter might have been one of these efforts. The flourishing of Aldeigjuborg coincides with a much larger presence of Swedish goods all over eastern Europe. The grains cultivated in the Saint Petersburg area have the same DNA structure as Swedish grain in Birka, indicating a strong Swedish presence in Western Russia. In the 10th century, Swedish presence is found in all of Russia and Ukraine. In about 997, Aldeigjuborg seems to have been burnt again as related by Heimskringla. In the 11th century the Swedish presence vanished, indicating that the Slavic and Finnic peoples in the region became dominant.

== Óláfsdrápa sænska ==
The Icelandic skald Óttarr svarti spent some time at Olof's court and composed the poem Óláfsdrápa sænska describing Olof's war expeditions in the east. The poem is interesting, since it gives a view of the reign of Olof: "The warrior guards his land, few kings are as mighty as him; Olof pleases the eagle, the Swedish king is outstanding". Other skalds who served Olof were Gunnlaugr ormstunga, Hrafn Önundarson and Gizurr svarti.

== Death ==
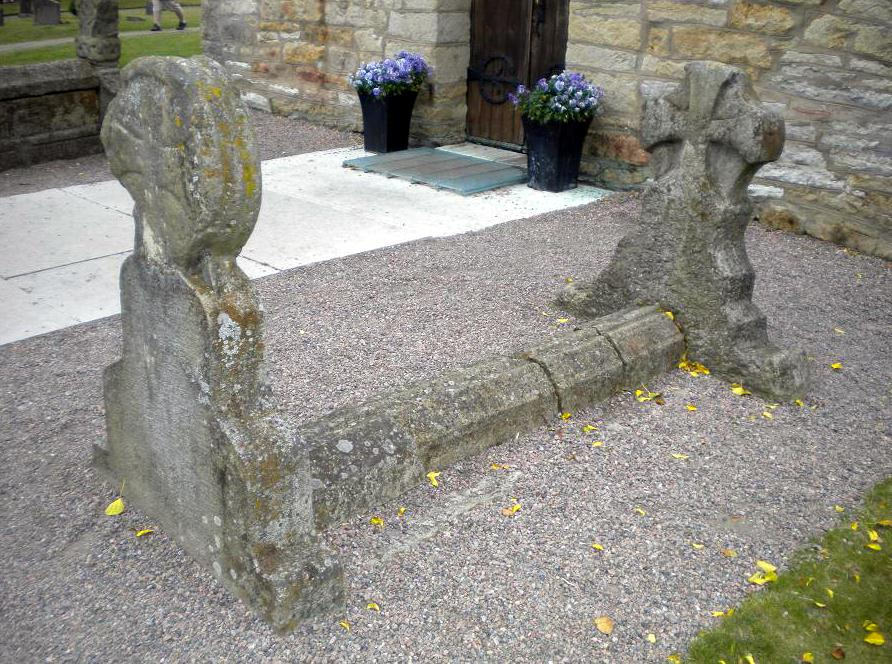
The alleged Olaf Grave at Husaby Church

Judging from Snorri Sturluson's chronology of events, Olof died a natural death in the winter of 1021–1022. Adam of Bremen asserts that he died at approximately the same time as Cnut the Great (1035), which is certainly too late.

Claims that he was martyred after refusing to sacrifice to pagan gods are likely due to a mix-up with the king Olof from Vita Ansgari and Olof Trätälja from Norse sources.

Since the 1740s, it has been claimed that he was buried in Husaby in the Christian part of his kingdom, but such identifications are controversial.

== Family ==
Olof was the son of Eric the Victorious (Erik Segersäll) and a woman whose identity is debated. According to Adam of Bremen she was the sister or daughter of Boleslaw I Chrobry of Poland, but, according to Icelandic sources, she was Sigrid the Haughty (Sigrid Storråda), a daughter of the Viking chief Skoglar Toste. Certain sources say that Olof had a brother called Emunde.

With his mistress Edla, daughter of a Slavic chief, he first had three children:

- Emund the Old, King of Sweden in c. 1050–1060
- Astrid, d. after 1035, married to Olaf II of Norway (Olaf the Saint)
- Holmfrid (possibly sister of Olof), married to Sven Jarl of Norway

With his spouse Queen Estrid he had two children:

- Anund Jacob, King of Sweden in 1022–c. 1050
- Ingegerd, d. 1050, married to Yaroslav the Wise

Olof Skötkonung House of Munsö Born: c. 980 Died: 1022
Regnal titles
| Preceded by Eric the Victorious | King of Sweden c. 995–1022 | Succeeded by Anund Jacob |
