= Bersöglisvísur =

Poem

Bersöglisvísur (English: "plain-speaking verses") is a skaldic poem composed by the Icelandic skald Sigvatr Þórðarson.

The poem, delivered to King Magnús Oláfsson, functioned as a form of political intervention on the part of Norwegian farmers who had contributed to the downfall of Magnús' father, Olaf Haraldsson II. Sigvatr encouraged the young king to show leniency towards the farmers.
