= Julius Langbehn =

German historian

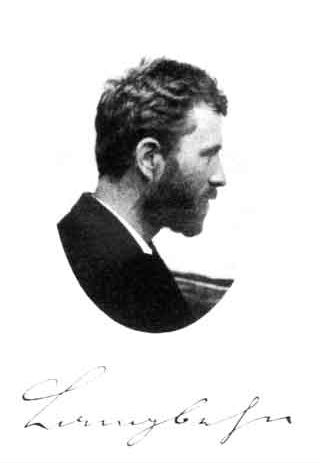
Julius Langbehn

Julius Langbehn (26 March 1851 – 30 April 1907) was a German national Romantic art historian and philosopher. He was born in Hadersleben, Schleswig (now Haderslev in Denmark), and died in Rosenheim.

== Biography ==
Langbehn was born in Hadersleben in what was then the Duchy of Schleswig, on 26 March 1851, the third of four sons. His father, a philologist, was dismissed from his position as the assistant principal at the local gymnasium shortly after Julius's birth, a result of a campaign to promote Danish nationalism in southern Denmark following the First Schleswig War and the Revolutions of 1848. The Langbehn family eventually settled in Kiel, where Julius entered the gymnasium in 1863. After graduation, he entered Kiel University for a degree in the natural sciences. At the age of 19, he enlisted in the Prussian Army following the outbreak of the Franco-Prussian War in 1870. He fought in the battles of Orleans and Le Mans in December 1870 and January 1871, respectively. Langbehn's military service left him with a profound distaste for war.

After the war, Langbehn returned to Kiel to study chemistry, though in 1872 he transferred to the Ludwig-Maximilians-Universität München with the help of a wealthy merchant. There, he grew bored with chemistry and began to study art and archaeology. After his mother suffered a nervous breakdown, Julius traveled to Venice before returning to Munich in 1875. He studied archaeology under Heinrich Brunn; his doctoral dissertation examined early Greek statues of Nike, the goddess of victory. He worked briefly at the Imperial Archaeology Institute in Rome in 1881. Over the following decade, he traveled throughout Germany, collecting material for his first book, Rembrandt als Erzieher (Rembrandt as Teacher), published in 1890. His work was focused on initiating cultural reform in Germany.

Rembrandt als Erzieher, which was published anonymously "by a German", was a huge success. Langbehn's attitudes towards Jews was initially favourable, but as the book went through its numerous editions, this changed, with new chapters introduced to this effect in the 37th edition, which were subsequently ever more stridently revised. In 1891, he published 40 Lieder (40 Poems), again anonymously; this proved to be a complete failure. The poems, which were explicitly erotic, prompted the state prosecutor of Schleswig-Holstein to threaten to press charges. The legal problems were sufficient to force Langbehn to withdraw the book. Der Rembrandtdeutsche followed, this time "by a friend of truth", though it too was not well received. Langbehn moved to Vienna, then in the Austro-Hungarian Empire, where he lived briefly. He shortly fled the country after having been convicted in a lawsuit from his landlord. Around this time Langbehn took on a disciple, a painter from Frisia by the name of Nissen.

After departing from Vienna, Langbehn traveled to Italy, southern France, Spain, and the Canary Islands in 1894. He then returned to Germany and continued his vagrant life there, producing no new works. In the mid-1890s, he began to attend Catholic churches, and in early 1900, he converted to Catholicism. He now directed his reformist tendencies toward the Catholic Church, and began to attack liberal segments. Langbehn died on 30 April 1907 of stomach cancer. He was buried in Puch near the Edignalinde at his own request because of his admiration for Edigna.

== Views ==
Langbehn's efforts at reform were a reaction against modernism. He particularly disliked materialism, democracy, and internationalism; he favored aristocracy, individualism, and peace. He believed that Germany should abandon industrialization and urbanization in favor of an agrarian society ruled by a monarch. While Langbehn's vision did away with the bourgeois, proletarians, and the Junkers, he strongly opposed a classless society, stating that "equality is death." He was also an antisemite and an early figure in the Völkisch movement. A widely read antisemite, Langbehn held that "A Jew can no more become a German than a plum can turn into an apple."

== Work ==
- Rembrandt als Erzieher (1890); Rembrandt as Educator. United Kingdom: Wermod and Wermod Publishing Group. (2017); Australia: Uthwita Press (2023).
- 40 Lieder von einem Deutschen (1891)
- Dürer als Führer (1928)
- Der Geist des Ganzen (1930)
- Briefe an Bischof Keppler (1937)
