= Uleb Ragnvaldsson =

Uleb (Ulf) Ragnvaldsson (Russian: Улеб (Ульф) Рагнвальдсон) was a posadnik and military leader of Novgorod. He led the Novgorodians in the conquest of Yugra in 1032. However, according to Nestor the Chronicler, the war party led by Ragnvald Ulfsson was crushed. The battle has been presumed to take place near or west from modern town of Syktyvkar as Mansi influence did exceed westwards from Ural Mountains.

His father was the jarl of Staraya Ladoga (Aldeigjuborg) Ragnvald Ulfsson and his mother Ingeborg Tryggvasdotter was the daughter of Tryggve Olafsson, the granddaughter of Harald Fairhair, and the sister of Olaf I of Norway. According some historians, he was a grandfather of Gyuryata Rogovich, from the famous Novgorod boyar family (ru:Гюрятиничи-Роговичи).

== Sources ==
- "Улеб, новгородец" . Brockhaus and Efron Encyclopedic Dictionary (in Russian). 1906.
