= Astrid Olofsdotter =

Queen of Norway from 1019 to 1028

Queen consort of Norway
- Tenure: 1019–1028
- Died: 1035
- Spouse: Saint Olaf
- Issue: Wulfhild, Duchess of Saxony
- House: Munsö
- Father: Olof Skötkonung
- Mother: Edla

Astrid Olofsdotter (Old Norse: Ástríðr Óláfsdóttir; Norwegian: Astrid Olavsdatter; died 1035) was the queen consort of Saint Olaf, who reigned over Norway from 1019 to 1028. Through her daughter Ulvhild, she was an ancestor of the present Norwegian royal family. She is the only woman to have a surviving skaldic praise-poem dedicated to her for her decisive address of the Swedish army in support of her stepson, Magnus the Good.

== Biography ==
Astrid was born to King Olof Skötkonung of Sweden and his Obotritian mistress Edla. She was the half sister of King Anund Jacob of Sweden and sister of King Emund the Old of Sweden. It is said that she and her brother Emund were not treated well by their stepmother, Queen Estrid, and that they were sent away to foster parents. Astrid was sent to a man named Egil in Västergötland.

In 1016, it had been decided that Norway and Sweden should come to more peaceful relations by a royal marriage alliance. Noblemen of both countries tried to arrange a marriage between King Olaf of Norway and Astrid's legitimate half-sister, Princess Ingegerd Olofsdotter of Sweden, but Ingegerd was instead married to Yaroslav I the Wise, Grand Prince of Novgorod and Kiev. Instead Astrid was married to King Olaf in Sarpsborg in 1019. Some sources say that Astrid replaced Ingegerd by the wish of her father, while others say that the marriage took place against the will of her father, through the cooperation of King Olaf and the Swedish jarl Ragnvald Ulfsson.

Astrid was described as beautiful, articulate and generous, and well liked by others. She was the mother of Wulfhild of Norway (1020–1070), who married Ordulf, Duke of Saxony, and the stepmother of King Magnus the Good, with whom she had a good relationship. In 1030, she was widowed when her husband was killed. She left Norway and returned to the Swedish court, where she had a high position. When her stepson Magnus visited Sigtuna on his way to claim the Norwegian throne, she gave him her official support and encouraged Sweden to do so as well.

== Sources ==
- Rudiger, Jan (2020). All the King's Women: Polygyny and Politics in Europe, 900–1250. Translated by Barnwell, Tim. Brill.
- Lagerqvist, Lars O. Sverige och dess regenter under 1.000 år. Albert Bonniers Förlag AB. 1982. ISBN 91-0-075007-7
- Thunberg, Carl L. Att tolka Svitjod [To interpret Svitjod]. Göteborgs universitet. CLTS. 2012. ISBN 978-91-981859-4-2.

Astrid Olofsdotter House of Munsö Born: Unknown Died: 1035
Norwegian royalty
Preceded by Sigrid Storråda	Queen consort of Norway; 1019–1028	Succeeded by Emma of Normandy
