= Estrid of the Obotrites =

Queen of Sweden from c. 1000 to 1022

Queen consort of Sweden
- Tenure: c. 1000–1022
- Born: 979
- Died: 1035 (aged 55–56)
- Spouse: Olof Skötkonung
- Issue: Ingegerd Olofsdotter; Anund Jacob
- Father: A tribal chief of the Polabian Obotrites

Estrid of the Obotrites (c. 979–1035) was Queen of Sweden in the Viking age, a West Slavic princess married to the King of Sweden, Olof Skötkonung c. 1000–1022. She was the mother of King Anund Jacob of Sweden and the Kievan Rus' saint and grand princess Ingegerd Olofsdotter.

== Biography ==
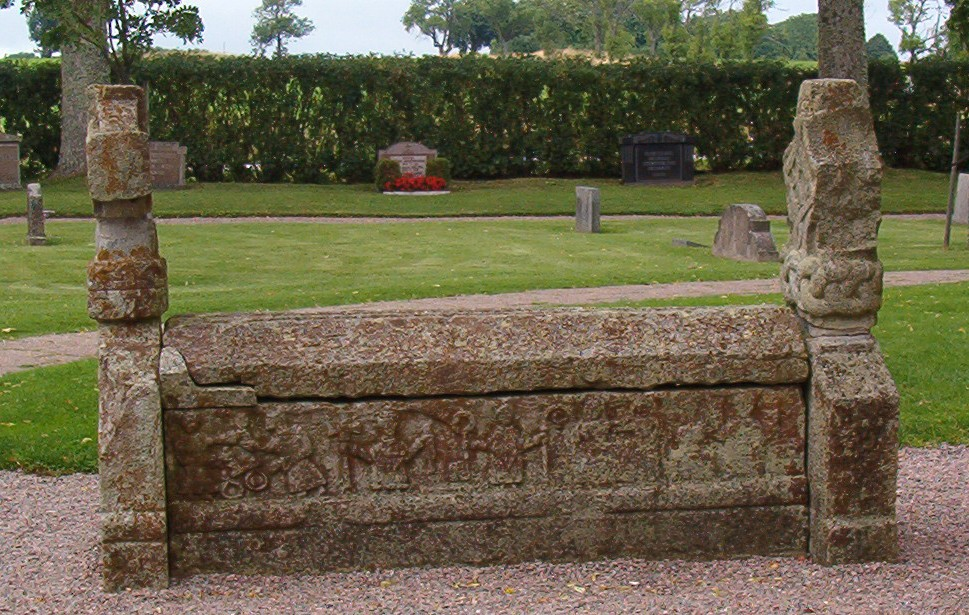
Grave suggested to be that of Queen Estrid at Husaby Church

Legend says that Estrid was possibly taken back to Sweden from a war in the West Slavic area of Mecklenburg, potentially as a war-prize. She was most likely given by her father, a tribal chief of the Polabian Obotrites, as a peace offering in a marriage to seal the peace, and she is thought to have brought with her a great dowry, as a great Slavic influence is represented in Sweden from her time, mainly among craftsmen.

Her husband also had a mistress, Edla, who came from the same area in Europe as herself, and who was possibly taken to Sweden at the same time. The king treated Edla and Estrid the same way and gave his son and his two daughters with Edla the same privileges as the children he had with Estrid, though it was Estrid he married and made queen.

Queen Estrid was baptised with her husband, their children and large numbers of the Swedish royal court in 1008, when the Swedish royal family converted to Christianity, although the king promised to respect the freedom of religion - Sweden was not to be Christian until the last religious war between Inge the Elder and Blot-Sweyn of 1084–1088.

Snorre Sturlasson wrote about her, that Estrid was unkind to the children (Emund, Astrid and Holmfrid) of her husband's mistress Edla;

" Queen Estrid was arrogant and not kind towards her stepchildren, and therefore the king sent his son Emund to Vendland, where he was brought up by his maternal relatives".

Not much more is known of Estrid as a person. Snorre Sturlasson mentions her as a lover of pomp and luxury, and as hard and strict towards her servants.

== Children ==
- Ingegerd Olofsdotter (c. 1001–1054), Grand Princess of Kiev, in Kievan Rus' called Anna, married Yaroslav I the Wise, prince of Novgorod and Kiev.
- Anund Jacob (c. 1010–1050), king of Sweden, succeeded Olof as king in c. 1022.

Estrid Born: 979 Died: 1035
Swedish royalty
Preceded by Aud Haakonsdottir of Lade	Queen consort of Sweden; 1000–1022	Succeeded by Gunhild
