= Växjö Lake =

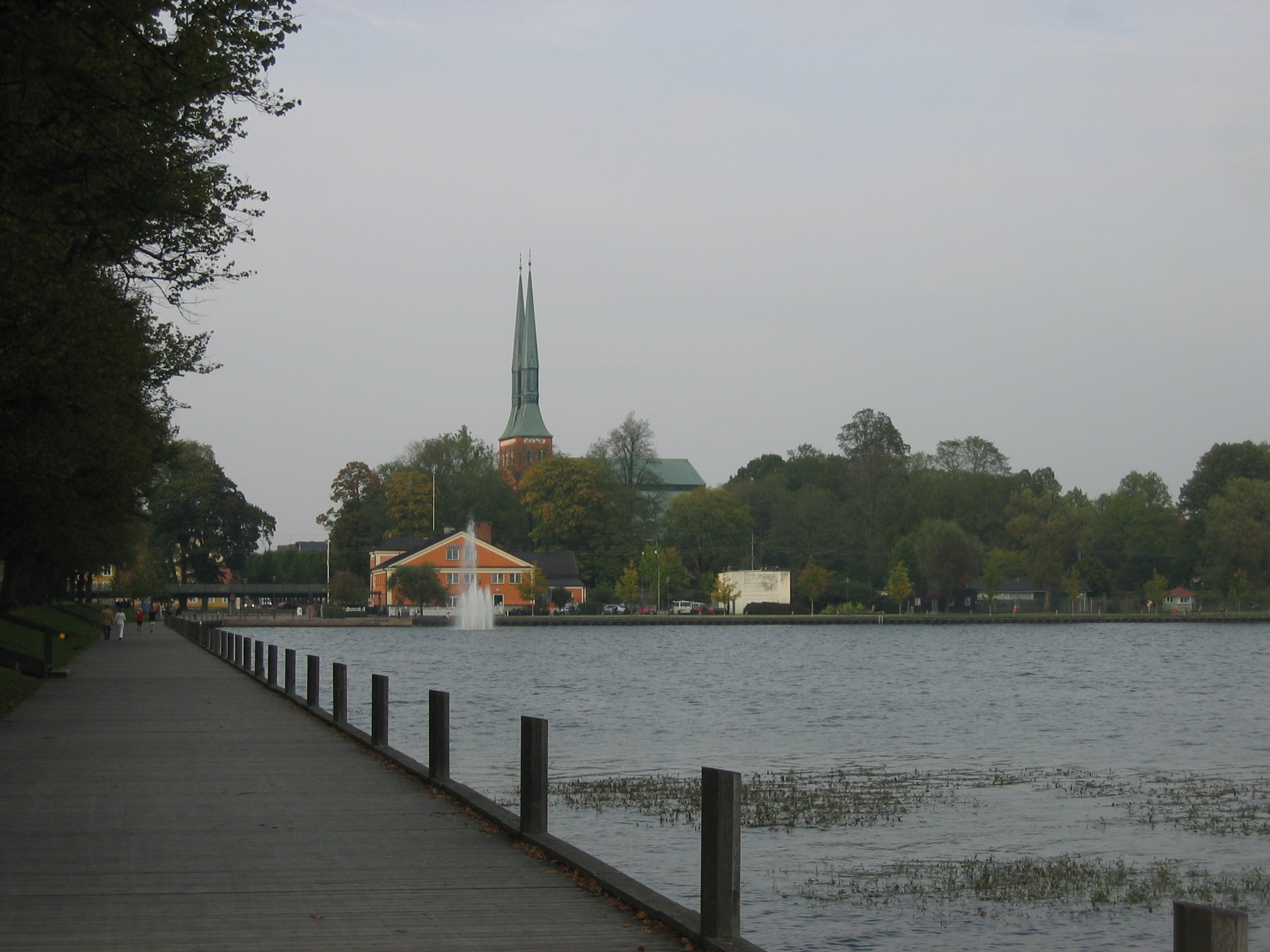
- Växjö Lake

- Location within Kronoberg Location within Sweden
- Location: Växjö Municipality, Sweden
- Coordinates: 56°52′00″N 14°48′40″E
- Type: lake

Växjö lake (Swedish: Växjösjön) is a lake in Växjö Municipality, Sweden. The lake is 6 meters deep, has an area of 0.772 square kilometers and is 160 meters above sea level. Around the lake there is a walking and cycling path, approximately 4.5 kilometres long.

When Växjo's sewage system was initially built in the 1860s it discharged into the lake, leading to serious pollution problems.
