= Ingegerd Olofsdotter =

Grand Princess of Kiev, venerated as Saint Anna

Grand Princess consort of Kiev
- Tenure: 1019–1050
- Born: 1001; Sweden
- Died: 10 February 1050 (aged 48/49)
- Burial: Saint Sophia's Cathedral, Kiev
- Spouse: Yaroslav I the Wise
- Issue: Elisiv, Queen consort of Norway; Anastasia, Queen consort of Hungary; Anne, Queen consort of France; Vladimir of Novgorod; Iziaslav I Sviatoslav II; Vsevolod I Igor Yaroslavich (possibly)
- House: Munsö
- Father: Olof Skötkonung
- Mother: Estrid of the Obotrites

Ingegerd Olofsdotter, also known as Irene or Anna (1001 – 10 February 1050), was a Swedish princess and the grand princess of Kiev from 1019 to 1050 as the wife of Yaroslav the Wise. She was the daughter of the Swedish king Olof Skötkonung by his wife Estrid of the Obotrites. She is venerated as a saint in the Eastern Orthodox Church.

== Life ==
Ingegerd was born a princess in the court of King Olof Skötkonung. In 1015, after Olaf II of Norway assumed the throne as King of Norway, he proposed a royal marriage alliance. In 1016, noblemen of both countries tried to arrange a marriage between King Olaf and Princess Ingegerd. Olof Skötkonung agreed at first but later he reneged. Rather he agreed to the marriage of his daughter, Astrid Olofsdotter to King Olaf.

Olof Skötkonung subsequently arranged for the marriage of Princess Ingegerd to the powerful Grand Prince Yaroslav I the Wise of Novgorod with whom Sweden had a flourishing trade relationship. The marriage took place in 1019.

Once in Kiev, Ingegerd had her name changed to the Greek Irene. According to several sagas, she received as a marriage gift Ladoga and adjacent lands, which later became known as Ingria, arguably a corruption of Ingegerd's name. She arranged for her father's cousin, jarl Ragnvald Ulfsson, to rule in her stead.

Together Ingegerd and Yaroslav had six sons and four daughters; three of the latter becoming Queens of France, Hungary, and Norway. The whole family is depicted in one of the frescoes of the Saint Sophia.

=== Death and burial ===
Ingegerd died on 10 February 1050. Upon her death, according to different sources, Ingegerd was buried in either Saint Sophia's Cathedral in Kiev or Cathedral of St. Sophia in Novgorod.

== Sainthood ==
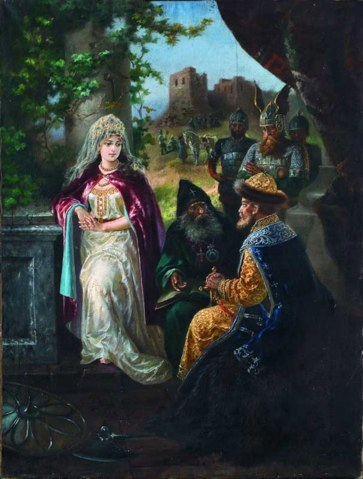
Yaroslav the Wise and Swedish princess Ingigerd, fantasy portrait by Aleksei Trankovsky, late 19th century

Ingegerd is traditionally identified with Saint Anna of Novgorod. The Novgorod diocese’s account states that she took the monastic name Anna before her death. This identification is disputed in historical scholarship. A. V. Nazarenko considers Saint Anna more likely to have been Yaroslav’s earlier wife. Maria Korogodina and Aleksey Sirenov question the historical authenticity of the name itself, arguing that its attribution to Vladimir Yaroslavich’s mother appears only in early-sixteenth-century records.

The Russian Primary Chronicle credits Yaroslav with founding Saint Sophia Cathedral in Kyiv under the year 1037 and records that their son Vladimir founded Saint Sophia Cathedral in Novgorod in 1045. The Novgorod diocese’s biography of Saint Anna associates her with the latter cathedral’s construction but states that the extent of her participation is unknown, principally crediting Vladimir.

== Children ==
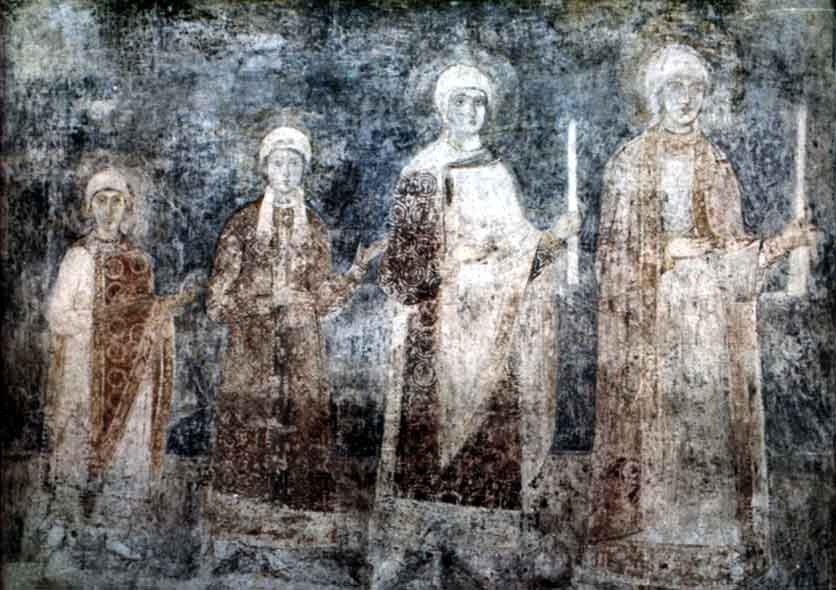
Surviving figures from the eleventh-century royal family fresco in Saint Sophia Cathedral, Kyiv, traditionally identified as daughters of Yaroslav the Wise and Ingegerd. Later repainting and restoration altered their appearance; the identification of the figures, including whether they represent sons or daughters, remains disputed.

Ingegerd had the following children:

- Elisiv of Kiev, queen of Norway
- Anastasia of Kiev, queen of Hungary
- Anne of Kiev, queen of France
- (possibly) Agatha, wife of Edward the Exile
- Vladimir of Novgorod
- Iziaslav I of Kiev
- Sviatoslav II of Kiev
- Vsevolod I, Prince of Kiev
- Igor Yaroslavich

== Bibliography ==
- Lars O. Lagerqvist (1982). "Sverige och dess regenter under 1.000 år" (in Swedish). Albert Bonniers Förlag AB. ISBN 91-0-075007-7.

Royal titles
Vacant Unconfirmed predecessor Title last held by Anna Porphyrogeneta	Grand Princess consort of Kiev; 1019–1050	Succeeded by Gertrude of Poland
