= Gyda of Sweden =

Queen of Denmark (died 1048/1049)

Queen consort of Denmark
- Tenure: 1047–1048/49
- Died: 1048/49; Denmark
- Spouse: Sweyn II of Denmark
- House: Munsö
- Father: Anund Jacob of Sweden
- Mother: Gunnhildr Sveinsdóttir

Gyda Anundsdotter of Sweden, also known as Guda and Gunhild (died c. 1048/1049), was a medieval and Viking Age Swedish princess and Danish queen consort, spouse of King Sweyn II of Denmark.

== Biography ==
There is little information about Gyda; our main source being the German ecclesiastic chronicler Adam of Bremen (c. 1075). According to the much later historian Saxo Grammaticus and the Icelandic annals, she was the daughter of the Swedish king, meaning Anund Jacob (1022 – c. 1050). Her mother would then be Queen Gunhild of Sweden. The near-contemporary Adam, however, does not say that Anund and Gunhild had any children. It is also possible that she was the daughter of Anund and another woman.

She was married to King Sweyn of Denmark, maybe in 1047 or 1048. The date cannot be confirmed, and it is possible that they were married during the time when Sweyn lived in exile at the Swedish court. After a short marriage, she died. According to Adam of Bremen it was a matter of foul play, since she was poisoned by Sweyn's concubine Thora. It is not known if any of the many children of Sweyn were also the children of Gyda. Her assumed father Anund died in c. 1050, and was survived by Gunhild. At about the same time, Gyda's widower Sweyn married a woman also called Gunhild. She was possibly the same person as Gyda's mother or stepmother, though several modern historians maintain that there were two separate Gunhilds, a Swedish and a Danish queen, respectively. A much later Chronicle of Bremen refers to a letter supposedly written by Archbishop Adalbert, which says that Gunhild was the "mother" (mother-in-law) of Sweyn. Anyway, Sweyn and Gunhild were soon forced to separate by the Archbishop of Hamburg on account of their close kinship.

Gyda has often been confused and mixed up with her assumed mother (or stepmother) Gunhild, as their names were similar, and because they were both married to Sweyn. Both of them were known as Gunhild, Guda or Gyda.

== Literature ==
- Alf Henrikson (1989), Dansk historia (Danish history). Stockholm: Bonniers (Swedish)
- "Gyda". (Dansk biografisk Lexikon / VI. Bind. Gerson - H. Hansen) (in Danish).

Gyda of Sweden House of Munsö Born: 11th century Died: 1049
Preceded by Emma of Normandy	Queen consort of Denmark; 1047/8–1049	Succeeded by Gunhild
