= Sigvatr Þórðarson =

Icelandic skald (995–1045)

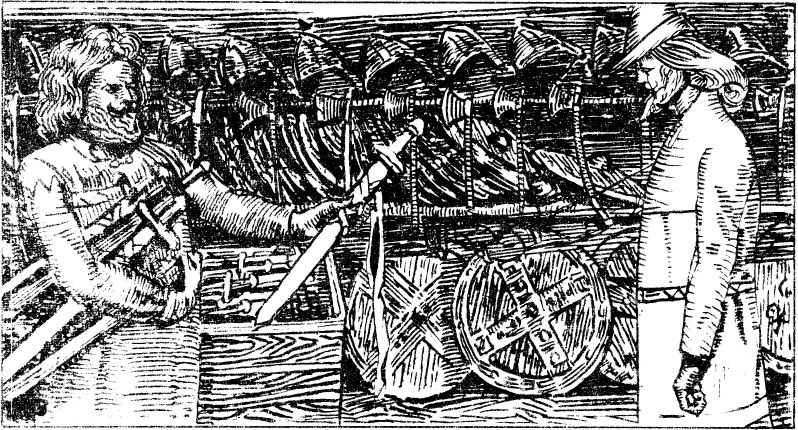
King Olaf presenting a sword to Sigvatr Þórðarson, Christian Krohg, 1899

Sigvatr Þórðarson or Sighvatr Þórðarson or Sigvatr Thórðarson or Sigvat the Skald (Note: Old Norse pronunciation: [ˈsiɣˌ(x)wɑtz̠ ˈθoːrðɑz̠ˌson]; Modern Icelandic: Sig(h)vatur Þórðarson [ˈsɪɣˌ(kʰ)vaːtʏr ˈθourðarˌsɔːn]; Modern Norwegian: Nynorsk: Sigvat Tordarson; Bokmål: Sigvat Tordsson) (995–1045) was an Icelandic skald. He was a court poet to King Olaf II of Norway, as well as Cnut the Great, Magnus the Good and Anund Jacob, by whose reigns his floruit can be dated to the earlier eleventh century. Sigvatr was the best known of the court skalds of King Olaf and also served as his marshal (stallare), even baptizing his son Magnus.

Approximately 160 verses of Sigvatr's poetry have been preserved, more than from any other poet of this period. The style of Sigvat's poems is simpler and clearer than that which generally characterises older compositions. Although his verse is still dense, he uses fewer complex poetic circumlocutions than many of his predecessors, and as a Christian poet, he by and large avoids allusions to pagan mythology.

Most of his surviving poems were texts that praised King Olaf. Many of the poems from St. Olaf's saga in Heimskringla are by Sigvatr. Víkingarvísur, composed c. 1014–15, is the oldest of the surviving long poems attributed to him. The poem tallies King Olaf's battles on his Viking expeditions until 1015, when he returned to Norway to carve out a kingdom for himself.

In Nesjavísur, the next oldest poem by Sigvatr, the skald describes the naval battle between Olaf and Sveinn Hákonarson at the Battle of Nesjar outside Brunlanes (near Larvik) in 1016, the key moment in Olaf's ascent to power in Norway.

== Preserved poetry ==
1. Víkingarvísur (‘verses of a Viking-raid’) — on the early deeds of King Olaf
2. Nesjavísur (‘verses of Nesjar’) — on the Battle of Nesjar
3. Austrfararvísur (‘verses of an eastern journey’) — on a diplomatic journey to Sweden
4. A drápa about King Olaf
5. Vestrfararvísur (‘verses of a western journey’) — on a journey to Great Britain
6. Two poems about Erlingr Skjalgsson
7. Tryggvaflokkr (‘a flock about Tryggvi’) — on Tryggve the Pretender
8. A poem about Queen Astrid
9. Knútsdrápa (‘Drápa of Knút’) — in memory of King Canute the Great
10. Bersöglisvísur (‘verses of plain-speaking’) — reprimand to King Magnus
11. Erfidrápa Óláfs helga (‘Saint Olaf's inheritance-drápa’) — in memory of King Olaf
12. Numerous Lausavísur
13. Brot - fragments

== Other sources ==
- Whaley, Diana (editor) Poetry from the Kings' Sagas 1, From Mythical Times to c. 1035 (Brepols Publishers. 2013) ISBN 978-2-503-51896-1
- O'Donoghue, Heather (2005) Skaldic Verse and the Poetics of Saga Narrative (Oxford University Press) ISBN 978-0199267323
