= Tryggve Olafsson =

Norwegian petty king (died c. 963)

Tryggve Olafsson (Old Norse: Tryggvi Óláfsson; Norwegian: Tryggve Olavsson; born c. 928 in Ringerike – died c. 963 in Sotnes, Bohuslän, Västra Götaland, Sweden) was the king of Viken, Norway (Vingulmark and Rånrike). He is the son of Olaf Haraldsson Geirstadalf and grandson of Norwegian King Harald Fairhair. He is also father to Norwegian King Olaf Tryggvason.
