= Swein Forkbeard =

King of Denmark and England (died 1014)

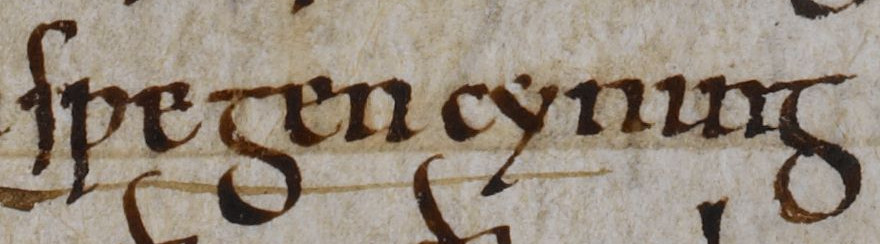
- Swegen cyning (King Swein) in folio 151r of manuscript C of the Anglo-Saxon Chronicle

King of Denmark
- Reign: c. 986 – 3 February 1014
- Predecessor: Harald Bluetooth
- Successor: Harald II

King of England
- Reign: December 1013 – 3 February 1014
- Predecessor: Æthelred the Unready
- Successor: Æthelred the Unready
- Died: 3 February 1014; Gainsborough, Lincolnshire, England
- Burial: Roskilde or Lund
- Spouse: Sister of Boleslaus, ruler of Poland (name not known) (Note: Swein's wife is given various names in later Scandinavian tradition, but none are accepted by historians. She is sometimes called Gunhild, which was apparently a name for Danish queens at this time. In Norse-Icelandic tradition she was Sigrid the Haughty, who is described by Jones as "non-existent". In Polish it was probably Czcirada or Świętosława.)
- Issue: Harald; Cnut; Estrid; Gytha
- Father: Harald Bluetooth
- Mother: Not known

Swein Forkbeard (Note: Swein's name is also shown as Sveinn Haraldsson, Sveinn Tjúguskegg (Old Norse), Sven Forkbeard, Swen Forkbeard, Sweyn Forkbeard and Swegen Forkbeard, Svend Tveskæg) (died 3 February 1014) was King of Denmark from c. 986 and briefly King of England from December 1013. He was also overlord of Norway c. 986 – c. 994 and from c. 1000. (Note: Swein is usually described by historians as overlord of Norway, but he is occasionally described as king of Norway.) He married the sister of Boleslaus, ruler of Poland, and had three known children by her: King Harald II of Denmark, King Cnut of England, and Estrid, the mother of the Danish king Sweyn Estridsson. Swein also had a daughter, Gytha, by an earlier liaison.

Around 986 Swein rebelled against his father, King Harald Bluetooth, and seized the throne of Denmark. Harald was driven into exile and died shortly afterwards. Harald had converted to Christianity, and Swein carried on his father's pro-Christian policies, although historians disagree whether his support was motivated by religious devotion or political calculation. In 992 or 993 he defeated an invasion by Erik, the king of the Svear (a people in eastern Sweden). Swein probably became overlord of the Svear and Erik died in the war or soon afterwards. In 994 Swein raided England together with the Norwegian warlord Olaf Tryggvason, until they were paid off by a tribute of 16,000 pounds. (Note: Calculating the modern value of Anglo-Saxon money is very difficult, particularly as the purchase power of the penny varied at different times and places, but 10,000 pounds is 2,400,000 pence, and each penny was probably equivalent to several tens of modern pounds sterling.) Swein had inherited the overlordship of Norway from his father, but Olaf challenged Swein's control and was recognised as king by many Norwegian magnates. In 999 or 1000, Swein defeated Olaf at the naval Battle of Svold; Olaf was killed in the battle and Swein recovered control of Norway. Swein returned to England in 1003 and ravaged until 1005, when a major famine forced him to go back to Denmark.

Swein is not known to have returned to England until 1013, when he invaded intent on conquest and seizure of the English throne. By December he had achieved full control and was acknowledged as king. After spending Christmas on the Isle of Wight, Æthelred the Unready, the Anglo-Saxon king of England, fled to his brother-in-law, Richard, Duke of Normandy. Swein's reign over England was very brief as he died on 3 February 1014. Historians praise him as a great Viking (Note: "Viking" is a term used by historians for Scandinavian people who left their homeland in the early Middle Ages in search of a better life. Anglo-Saxon writers used it to mean Scandinavian pirates who attacked England, although in the account of the reign of Æthelred the Unready in the Anglo-Saxon Chronicle the invaders are usually described as Danes. The term is not used for the Scandinavian inhabitants of the Danelaw in eastern and northern England.) warrior and an able king.

== Sources ==
Little is definitely known about Swein's life. Most accounts have been based on Adam of Bremen's Deeds of the Bishops of Hamburg, which dates to the 1070s. Adam was a strong supporter of the claims of the German emperor and archbishop of Hamburg–Bremen for authority over Denmark. The historian Peter Sawyer states that Adam was hostile to Swein and there is much which is clearly false in his account: "Adam denigrated Swein because the latter neither recognized the German emperor as his overlord nor acknowledged the ecclesiastical authority of the archbishop of Hamburg–Bremen, which in Adam's eyes was tantamount to paganism." Other scholars, such as Gwyn Jones and Niels Lund, also regard Adam as very unreliable. An example of claims by Adam that are rejected by historians is that Swein apostasised and persecuted the church, and as punishment by God he was defeated by King Erik of Sweden and spent fourteen years in exile in Scotland. Lund comments that other sources give a very different account, and "they are so much more reliable that we have little reason to doubt that Adam invented his story". The chronicler Thietmar of Merseburg, who was a contemporary of Swein, was also hostile to him.

The Encomium Emmae Reginae, commissioned by Swein's daughter-in-law Emma in the early 1040s, is equally biased in the opposite direction, praising Swein. Other sources include the Anglo-Saxon Chronicle (Note: The Anglo-Saxon Chronicle, often abbreviated as the Chronicle or ASC, is a term used by modern scholars to describe a set of annals which are the most important source for Anglo-Saxon history. The lost original compilation, known as the 'common stock', was written in the late ninth century, probably at the court of Alfred the Great. This has been added to in the later recensions, known as ASC A to ASC F. These are usually presented as detached reporting, but reflect their authors' locations, political views and interests.) and skaldic verses in later Icelandic sagas, such as a verse which refers to Swein "bloodying swords in England with God's help". Swein's byname, "Forkbeard", is first recorded around 1140 in the Roskilde Chronicle.

== Background ==
In the ninth century, Anglo-Saxon England came under increasing attack from Viking raids, culminating in an invasion by the Great Heathen Army in 865. By 878, the Vikings had overrun the kingdoms of Northumbria, East Anglia, and Mercia, and nearly conquered Wessex, but in that year the West Saxons achieved a decisive victory at the Battle of Edington under King Alfred the Great (r. 871–899). Over the next fifty years, the West Saxons and Mercians gradually conquered the Viking-ruled areas, and in 927 Alfred's grandson Æthelstan (r. 924–939) became the first king of all England when he conquered Northumbria. He was succeeded by his half-brothers Edmund (r. 939–946) and Eadred (r. 946–955), who both lost control of York (southern Northumbria) at the start of their reigns, but had recovered it by the time of their deaths. There was then a generation of peace, until Viking attacks resumed with small-scale raids from Scandinavia in the early 980s.

Denmark's power declined in the late ninth and early tenth centuries, and its revival probably began under Swein's grandfather, Gorm the Old, who died around 958. He was succeeded by his son Harald Bluetooth, who extended Danish royal authority and claimed on the inscription on one of the Jelling stones that he had "won the whole of Denmark for himself, and Norway, and made the Danes Christian." Gorm had been a pagan, but Harald converted to Christianity in the mid-960s. He controlled the area around the Oslofjord in Norway and was acknowledged as overlord by the most powerful Norwegian ruler, Hakon Sigurdsson, Earl of Hlathir. Harald paid homage to the German emperor, Otto I, but when Otto died in 973 Harald unsuccessfully attempted to defy his son and successor, Otto II. In 982 Otto was defeated by the Muslim ruler of Sicily at the Battle of Stilo in Calabria, and the following year Harald campaigned successfully against the Germans, thus removing any imminent threat of German invasion.

== Life ==
=== Early life ===
Swein was a son of Harald Bluetooth and an unknown mother. It is not known when Swein was born. However, he was old enough to be a grandfather by 998, when his grandson Hakon Eriksson was born.

In 986 or 987 Swein revolted against his father with the support of sections of the nobility and seized the Danish throne. Harald was defeated and wounded in battle against his son. He was driven into exile, where he soon died of his wounds. In the view of the historian Timothy Bolton, the family turned in on itself, "unleashing a brief civil war that ended in a scandalous regicide and apparently leaving a deep scar on Danish memory". Jones describes Harald's expulsion as an "astonishing reversal", probably due to erosion of the nobility's ancient rights and hostility to Christianity, particularly because the church was pro-German.

=== King of Denmark and Viking raider ===
Swein extended Danish control east of Øresund (a strait which now forms the border between Denmark and Sweden) into Skane in what is now southern Sweden. The main centres of Danish power shifted from Jutland to the towns of Roskilde and Lund on each side of the strait. Harald and Swein unified Denmark in the second half of the tenth century, and some aristocrats lost out and joined bands of Viking raiders. Swein was secure enough at home to become the first Scandinavian king known to have led Viking raids. His armies comprised his own retainers and the bands of other Viking warlords, drawn from all over Scandinavia. The main Viking target was England, which under King Æthelred the Unready was both wealthy and militarily weak, and Swein's ability to extract large amounts of tribute enhanced and extended his power in Scandinavia. The Encomium states that Swein made his men "submissive and faithful to himself by manifold and generous munificence", and Lund comments that "the world in which Swein was operating was the traditional early medieval world in which princes bought loyalty by means of gifts and political relations were maintained by a subtle blend of coercion and reward".

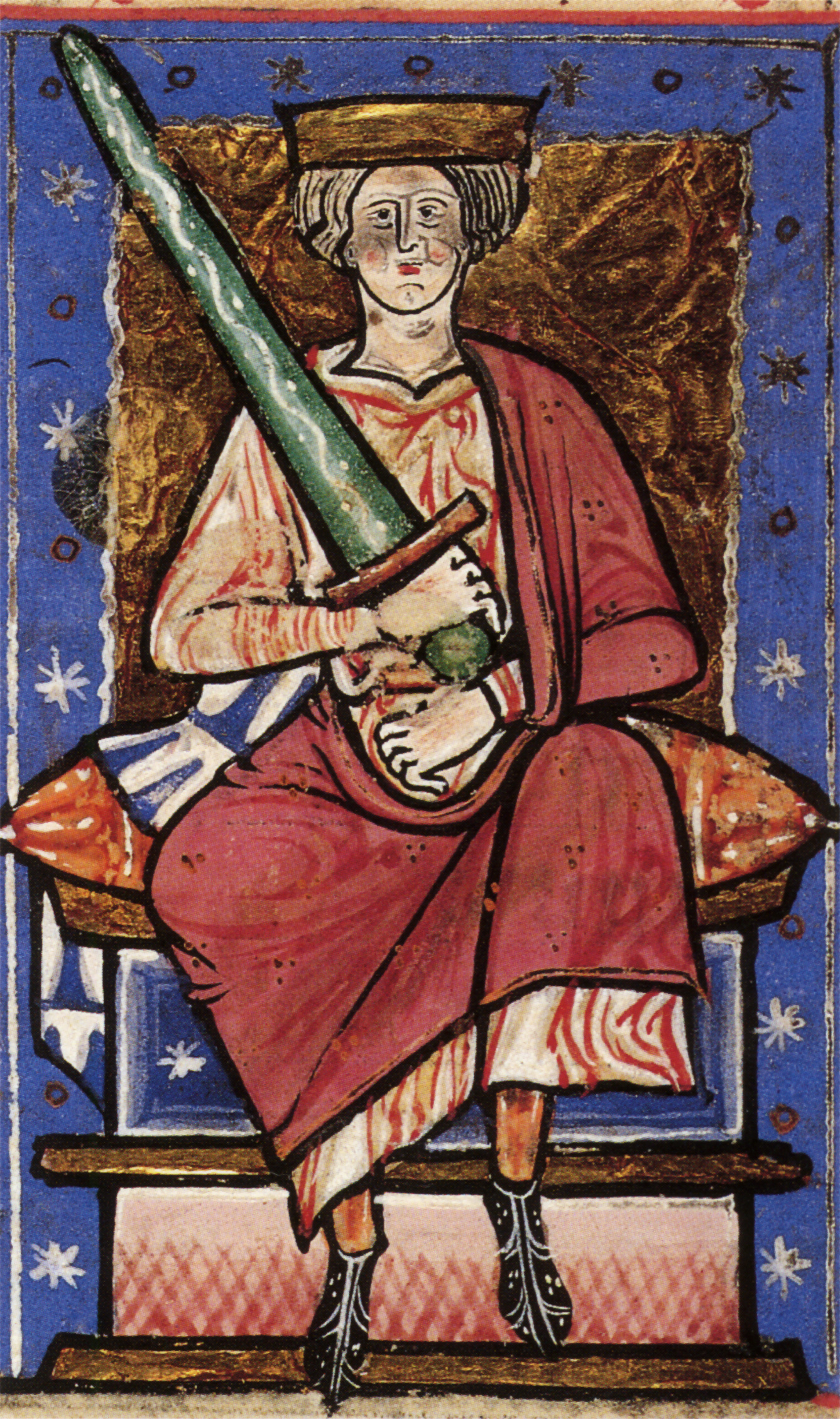
Æthelred in the Abingdon Chronicle, c.1220

In 991 the English suffered a devastating defeat against a Viking army at the Battle of Maldon in Essex, and they paid 10,000 pounds in tribute to get the invaders to leave. The Anglo-Saxon Chronicle names the Viking leader as the Norwegian warlord Olaf Tryggvason, but historians think that the Viking army was probably also led by Swein. The confirmation by King Æthelred of the will of Æthelric of Bocking between 995 and 999 refers to an allegation many years before Æthelric died that he had been involved in a plot to receive Swein in Essex when he first came to England, and this is thought to refer to the raid in 991; Sawyer suggests that Swein was the senior commander over Olaf.

The Svear (a people in eastern Sweden) resented Danish control of the trade route to the North Sea, and in 992 or 993 Erik, King of the Svear, attacked Denmark. Swein defeated the invasion and Erik died either during the war or soon afterwards. Erik was succeeded by his son Olof, whose byname "Skötkonung" means tributary king. Lund and Sawyer see Olof's byname as evidence that he acknowledged Swein as his overlord, but in the view of the historian Sverre Bagge the relationship between Olof and Swein is not known. (Note: Howard sees Swein's activities in England as evidence for statements by Adam and Thietmar that Swein was driven into exile. Howard argues that he did not exercise power in Denmark between 990 and 995, and rejects the view of Sawyer and Lund that the raids are evidence of the security of Swein's control. Almost all historians think that Swein never lost power in Denmark, but Ryan Lavelle suggests that Swein may have been driven into exile by a usurper.)

Swein and Olaf Tryggvason invaded England in 994. They unsuccessfully attacked London, and then raided around the south-east until the English agreed to pay a tribute of 16,000 pounds. Swein then probably sailed west as, according to the Annales Cambriae, "Swein son of Harald" ravaged the Isle of Man. King Æthelred persuaded Olaf to enter his service, and then encouraged him to return to Norway to challenge Swein's overlordship. Olaf was recognised as king by many Norwegian magnates, and Æthelred was thus successful in distracting Swein from attacking England for several years. Olaf was killed in 999 or 1000 in the naval Battle of Svold against Swein, who was supported by Olof Skötkonung and Hakon Sigurdsson's sons. Swein recovered his overlordship over Norway, and he appointed Hakon's sons, Erik Hakonsson (his son-in-law) and Swein Hakonarson to rule as jarls (earls).

Southern coastal areas of England suffered from Viking raids in 997 to 999, and Swein returned in 1003. He sacked Exeter, defeated local armies of Wiltshire and Hampshire, ravaged Wilton and then returned to his ships. The next year Swein attacked East Anglia, sacking Thetford and Norwich, and then met an army led by the local military commander, Ulfcytel. The Vikings were again victorious, but only at the expense of heavy losses, and then escaped back to their ships. In 1002 King Æthelred had ordered the St Brice's Day massacre of Danish people in England, and post-Conquest chroniclers attributed Swein's return to a desire to avenge the massacre. The twelfth-century historian William of Malmesbury stated that Swein's sister Gunhilde was a victim of the massacre along with her husband Pallig. Twentieth-century historians such as Frank Stenton and Gwyn Jones thought that Swein returned to avenge his sister's death, but twenty-first century historians are sceptical because William is the only source for Gunhilde's existence and Pallig deserted the English before the massacre. Ann Williams and Levi Roach think that the story is a myth, and Sawyer ignores Gunhilde and the massacre in his biographical article about Swein. Bolton suggests that Swein led the raids on England to avert the danger of his subordinates making so much money that they were in a position to threaten his position in Denmark.

A severe famine forced Swein to return to Denmark in 1005. The Viking army resumed its raids in England in 1006, and ravaged at will, defeating every English army sent against it until bought off with a tribute of 36,000 pounds. Swein is not named by the Anglo-Saxon Chronicle among the Viking leaders between 1005 and 1013. Some leaders may have been his followers, but Thorkell the Tall, who ravaged England between 1009 and 1012, was an independent warlord. After extracting tribute of 48,000 pounds he went over to Æthelred with forty-five ships, and served him faithfully until the king's death in 1016.

=== Conquest of England ===
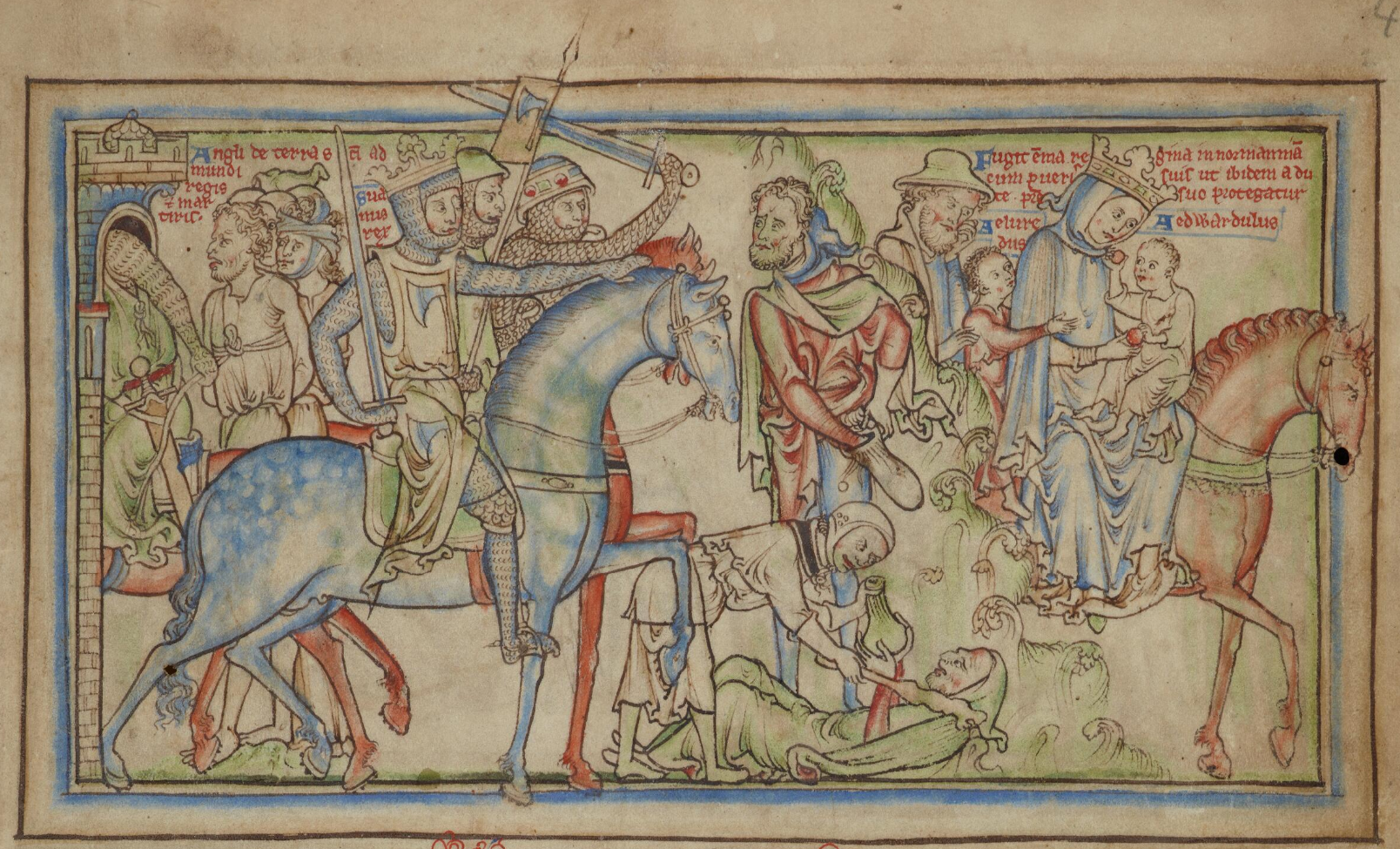
'Swein conquers England', an illustration from Matthew Paris's Life of Edward the Confessor, c. 1240. Swein is the front left man on horseback. On the right, Edward's wife, Emma of Normandy, is fleeing to her brother with her two children.

Map of Sweyn's campaign in England.

Swein returned to England in August 1013 with his younger son Cnut, leaving his older son Harald to rule Denmark. Unlike in his previous attacks, Swein was now intent on the full conquest of England. Some historians suggest that he invaded because he feared that Thorkell could threaten his position in Scandinavia with English support; others think that he just seized the opportunity presented by Thorkell's weakening of England to achieve an important conquest. Lund describes Thorkell as "perhaps one of Swein's most dangerous Scandinavian enemies", but does not think that he was a threat to Swein's control of Denmark.

Swein sailed to Sandwich in Kent, and, perhaps because he found the fleets of Æthelred and Thorkell off the coast, immediately sailed north to Gainsborough in Lincolnshire. The magnates of the East Midlands and the North quickly submitted to him. Swein did not allow plundering until the army was south of Watling Street, the traditional dividing line between the culturally Scandinavian Danelaw and the Anglo-Saxon south and west. Oxford and Wallingford surrendered to him, but he was unable to take London, which was defended by Æthelred and Thorkell. Swein then secured the submission of the south-west at Bath, and after that the whole nation, including London, accepted him as king. Weakened by the ravaging the country had suffered between 1006 and 1012, and by internal dissension, the English were unable to put up serious resistance to Swein's army.

Æthelred spent Christmas on the Isle of Wight and then took shelter with his brother-in-law, Richard, Duke of Normandy. The historians Simon Roffey and Ryan Lavelle see Richard's decision to give support and shelter to Æthelred as evidence of Norman opposition to Swein's Anglo-Danish kingdom. Swein demanded and received full payment and provisions for his army for the winter. Around this time, Cnut married a member of a leading northern family, Ælfgifu of Northampton, and the marriage may have been arranged by his father to strengthen his position in the north..

According to the Gesta Normannorum Ducum (Deeds of the Norman Dukes) by William of Jumièges, Swein left the army in England to go to Rouen and negotiated a treaty with Duke Richard whereby the Danes gained permission to sell their spoils of war in Normandy. This treaty is not recorded by other medieval chroniclers and historians disagree whether it dates to 1003, responding to the St Brice's Day massacre, or 1013, as William implies, and even whether it existed at all. Pierre Bauduin argues that the treaty was not directed against Æthelred, but was rather intended to regulate the relations between the Danes and the Normans.

=== Religion ===
Historians do not agree whether Swein was a sincere Christian. Stenton describes him as a "nominal" and "tepid" Christian, who put himself at the head of a pagan reaction against his father's imposition of Christianity to seize the Danish throne, and Simon Keynes describes him as "ostensibly a Christian king". Sawyer and Lund disagree, and point out that Swein continued the Christianisation of Denmark started by his father. At least three missionary bishops worked in the country during his reign, two English and one Danish, and churches were built in Roskilde and Lund. Like other kings of recently converted kingdoms, Swein saw subordination of his church to the archbishop of a neighbouring imperial power as a threat to his independence, and he expelled four bishops who were suffragans of Hamburg-Bremen so as to reduce German influence, replacing them with English missionary bishops who were not given fixed sees. According to Adam, only a few missionary bishops of Hamburg-Bremen were allowed to stay in Denmark, and perhaps only one, a Danish aristocrat called Odinkar the Elder. Royal and magnate support or opposition to Christianity was strongly influenced by political considerations, and Scandinavian kings, including Swein, were willing to ally with pagans in wars against Christian opponents.

=== Coinage ===
Silver penny dated around 995, with inscription on obverse 'SVEN REX AD DENER' (Swein King of the Danes), reverse 'GODPINE M AN DNER' (Godwine moneyer in Denmark). (Note: The historians Nils Hybel and Bjørn Poulsen state that Godwine was an English moneyer who also minted coins for the kings of Sweden and Norway, but Lund disagrees, stating that the Scandinavian kings just copied Godwine's name when imitating English coins.) This is the earliest surviving example of the Latin alphabet in Denmark.

Olaf Tryggvason issued Norwegian coins, and it was probably in response that Swein made his own Danish issue, naming himself as king, which is described by the National Bank of Denmark as the first official Danish coin. Both issues were based on Æthelred's crux type of the mid-990s, which has a cross on the reverse. As of 1994, only eight specimens of Swein's issue were known, all of which had an obverse struck from the same die, indicating that it was on a small scale. There were also much larger issues, perhaps in Lund, based on Æthelred's coinage, with botched lettering which did not name Swein as king.

== Death ==
Swein's rule was very short, as he died at Gainsborough on 3 February 1014. His demise is described in the Anglo-Saxon Chronicle as a "happy event". He was buried at York and may have planned to be crowned there. According to Thietmar, an unnamed English woman, perhaps Cnut's wife Ælfgifu, had the body exhumed and sent back to Denmark. The Encomium states that he was buried in a mausoleum he had had constructed for himself, in a monastery of his own foundation dedicated to the Holy Trinity, but does not identify the town. Most historians state that Swein was buried in Roskilde, but Maria Cinthio's excavation of the Holy Trinity church in Lund (now in southern Sweden) has revealed an empty grave in front of the high altar, and she suggests that this is Swein's grave. This theory is supported by Martin Biddle and Birthe Kjølbye-Biddle.

== Aftermath ==
Following Swein's death, the Danish fleet chose Cnut as king, but the English magnates recalled Æthelred. He marched north and drove Cnut out of England. The next year Æthelred's eldest surviving son, Edmund Ironside, rebelled after two of his chief allies were murdered by his father's chief adviser, Eadric Streona, and the English were in disarray when Cnut returned for his own attempt at the throne in the summer. He was aided by the defection of Eadric. Æthelred died on 23 April 1016 and rival assemblies of magnates chose Edmund and Cnut as king. Edmund carried on the fight until he was defeated at the Battle of Assandun on 18 October. The country was then divided, Edmund holding Wessex and Cnut the country north of the Thames, but Edmund died on 30 November and Cnut became king of all England.

== Family ==
Adam and Thietmar both state that Swein married a sister of Boleslaus I, ruler of Poland, but later rejected her, and this is supported by a statement in the Encomium that when Swein died her sons recalled her from Poland. Her name is not known. She had two sons by Swein, Harald and Cnut, and a daughter, Estrid, who married one of Cnut's earls, Ulf Jarl, and was the mother of Swein Estrithsson, King of Denmark. Adam of Bremen claimed that Swein Forkbeard's wife was the widow of Erik of Sweden, and this is accepted by Sawyer and Bolton, but rejected by Lund. Adam is the only source to state that she was Erik's widow, and Lund argues that Adam invented it to justify his claim that Swein Estrithsson's marriage to a granddaughter of Erik's wife was incestuous.

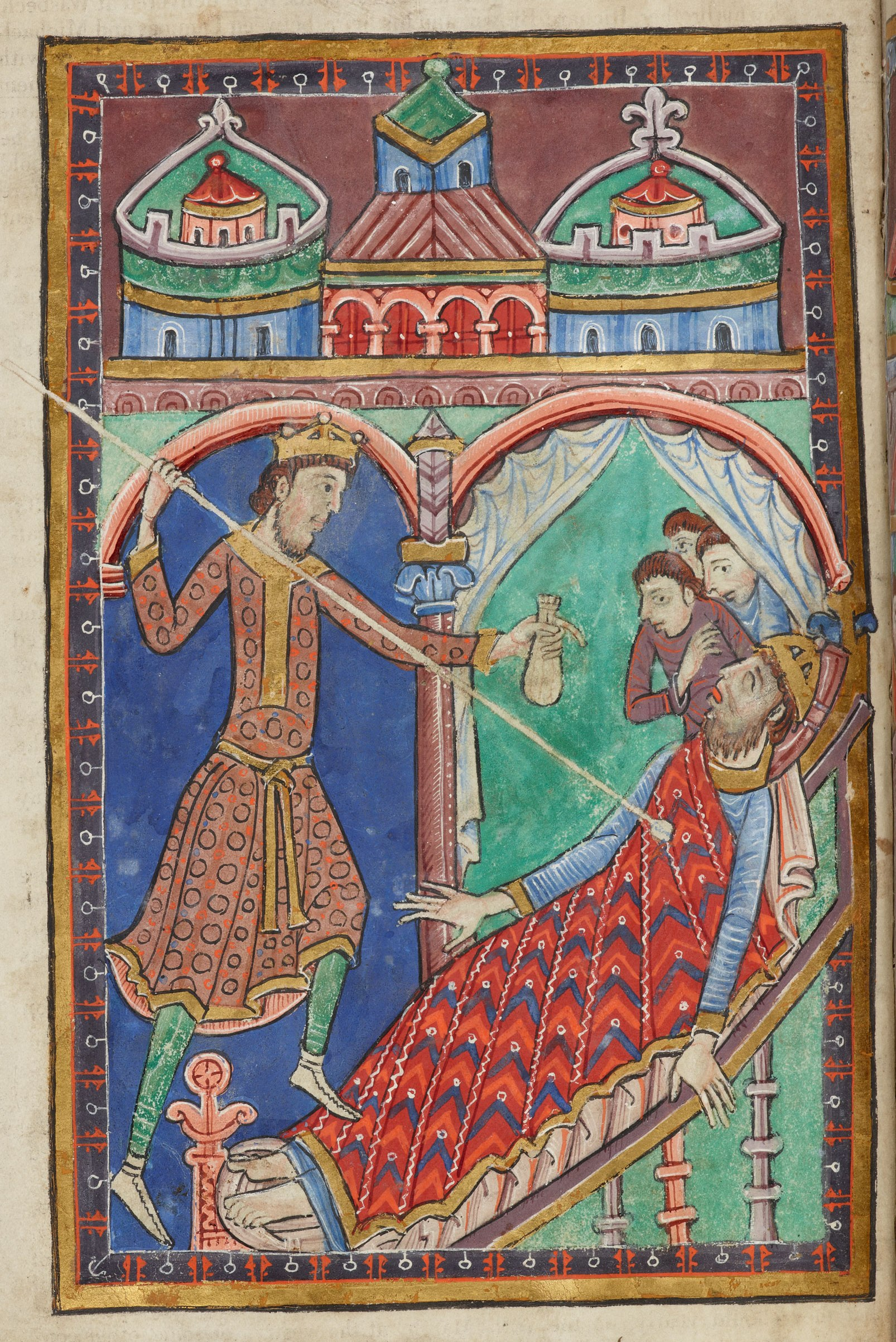
St Edmund the Martyr, holding a moneybag which he pretends to offer to Swein, then kills him with his lance as punishment for his oppressive taxation of the English people, an illustration in Goscelin's version of the Miracles of St Edmund.

Harald, who succeeded Swein as king of Denmark, is described in the Encomium as Cnut's younger brother, but other sources say that Harald was the elder, and this view is defended by Niels Lund. When Swein died, Cnut returned to Denmark and requested that his brother share the kingdom. Harald refused, claiming that Denmark was his paternal inheritance. Cnut accepted the decision in good spirit and the brothers remained on good terms. Lund argues that it is very unlikely that Cnut would have accepted the decision if he had been the elder son, and also that it was usual to name the elder son after his grandfather and to leave him in charge when the king was absent. Lund's arguments are accepted by Bolton and Keynes, and tentatively by M. K. Lawson.

Another daughter of Swein, Gytha, married his ally, Erik Hakonsson, and had a son Hakon Eriksson in 998. Gytha must have been born before Swein became king of Denmark, probably not much after 980. Nothing is known of her mother. Another possible daughter is recorded in the Liber Vitae of New Minster, Winchester, which lists a sister of Cnut with the garbled name Santslave, perhaps an error for Świętosława. She might be the same person as an unnamed daughter of Swein who married the equally garbled Wyrtgeorn, King of the Wends, according to the medieval chronicler John of Worcester.

== Reputation ==
Swein had an afterlife in hagiographical accounts of the posthumous miracles of Edmund the Martyr, a king of East Anglia killed by the Vikings in 870. Swein is portrayed as a villain punished for his oppression of the English by being killed by Edmund. The story is first recorded in the 1090s in the Miracles of St Edmund, by Herman the Archdeacon, and abbreviated shortly afterwards by Goscelin. The legend was repeated by post-Conquest chroniclers such as William of Malmesbury, John of Worcester and Matthew Paris.

Bagge observes that Swein is scornfully dismissed in medieval sagas, which are pro-Norwegian, as "the leader of the 'soft' Danes who preferred to lick their bowls during pagan sacrifices rather than expose themselves to danger in battles". Modern historians strongly disagree, and Bagge describes Swein as "a great warrior and Viking chieftain". Jones comments: "What we can believe is that [Swein] was a man of outstanding quality, and that unlike Olaf Tryggvason he was tolerant and sensible. He fostered Christianity, to which he was personally not much drawn, in a pragmatic and effective way". Sawyer praises his achievements:

The evidence, though slight, is sufficient to show that Swein was a remarkable, and a remarkably successful, king. His achievements outside Denmark are better documented than those in it, but there is no reason to suppose that his triumphs abroad were matched by failure at home. His external success, especially against the English, enabled him to retain the loyalty of the warriors on whom his power ultimately depended.

== Sources ==
- Abels, Richard (2004). "Ulfcytel [Ulfcytel Snillingr] (d. 1016)". Oxford Dictionary of National Biography. Oxford University Press. doi:10.1093/ref:odnb/27984. (subscription, Wikipedia Library access or UK public library membership required)
- Bagge, Sverre (2014). Cross and Scepter: The Rise of the Scandinavian Kingdoms from the Vikings to the Reformation. Princeton, New Jersey: Princeton University Press. ISBN 978-0-691-16150-1.
- Bauduin, Pierre (2021). "Quasi in domo propria sub securitate sanaretur: a peace agreement between King Swein Forkbeard and Duke Richard II of Normandy". Early Medieval Europe. 29 (3): 394–416. doi:10.1111/emed.12480. ISSN 1468-0254. S2CID 236400372.
- Biddle, Martin; Kjølbye-Biddle, Birthe (2016). "Danish Royal Burials in Winchester: Cnut and his Family". In Lavelle, Ryan; Roffey, Simon (eds.). Danes in Wessex: The Scandinavian Impact on Southern England, c. 800 – c. 1100. Oxford, UK: Oxbow Books. pp. 212–249. ISBN 978-1-78297-931-9.
- Bolton, Timothy (2007). "Ælfgifu of Northampton: Cnut the Great's Other Woman". Nottingham Medieval Studies. 51: 247–268. doi:10.1484/J.NMS.3.417. ISSN 0078-2122.
- Bolton, Timothy (2017). Cnut the Great. New Haven, Connecticut: Yale University Press. ISBN 978-0-300-20833-7.
- Brandt, Urs; Svendsen, Gert (2026). "Did Ethelred the Unready make optimal choices when paying Danegeld to Svein Forkbeard? Viking Age England and game theory". Rationality and Society. 38 (3): 311–339. doi:10.1177/10434631261453856. ISSN 1043-4631.
- Campbell, Alistair, ed. (1949). Encomium Emmae Reginae. London, UK: Royal Historical Society. OCLC 1067634827.
- "Coin (penning)". The Viking World Exhibition. Stockholm, Sweden: Swedish History Museum.
- Darlington, Reginald; McGurk, Patrick, eds. (1995). The Chronicle of John of Worcester (in Latin and English). Vol. 2. Oxford, UK: Clarendon Press. ISBN 978-0-19-822261-3.
- Foot, Sarah (2011). "Æthelstan (Athelstan) (893/4–939), King of England". Oxford Dictionary of National Biography. Oxford University Press. doi:10.1093/ref:odnb/833. (subscription, Wikipedia Library access or UK public library membership required)
- Gelting, Michael (2007). "The Kingdom of Denmark". In Berend, Nora (ed.). Christianization and the Rise of Christian Monarchy: Scandinavia, Central Europe and Rus' c. 900–1200. Cambridge, UK: Cambridge University Press. pp. 73–120. ISBN 978-0-521-87616-2.
- Gransden, Antonia (1974). Historical Writing in England c.550-c.1307. London, UK: Routledge & Kegan Paul. ISBN 978-0-7100-7476-8.
- Hahn, Cynthia (1990). "Proper Behavior for Knights and Kings: the Hagiography of Matthew Paris, Monk od St Albans". The Haskins Society Journal. 2: 237–248. ISSN 0963-4959.
- Heather, Peter (2022). Christendom: The Triumph of a Religion. London, UK: Penguin Books. ISBN 978-0-141-98853-5.
- "Historical coins". Copenhagen, Denmark: Danmarks Nationalbank. 2026.
- Howard, Ian (2003). Swein Forkbeard's Invasion and the Danish Conquest of England, 991 – 1017. Woodbridge, UK: The Boydell Press. ISBN 978-0-85115-928-7.
- Hybel, Nils; Poulsen, Bjørn (2007). The Danish Resources c. 1000 – 1550: Growth and Recession. Leiden, Netherlands: Brill. ISBN 978-9047422044.
- Jones, Gwyn (1984). A History of the Vikings (2nd ed.). Oxford, UK: Oxford University Press. ISBN 978-0-19-280134-0.
- Jonsson, Kenneth (1994). "The Coinage of Cnut". In Rumble, Alexander (ed.). The Reign of Cnut, King of England, Denmark and Norway. London, UK: Leicester University Press. pp. 193–230. ISBN 978-0-7185-0205-8.
- Keynes, Simon (1980). The Diplomas of King Æthelred the Unready 978 – 1016. Cambridge, UK: Cambridge University Press. ISBN 978-0-521-02308-5.
- Keynes, Simon; Lapidge, Michael, eds. (1983). Alfred the Great: Asser's Life of King Alfred & Other Contemporary Sources. London, UK: Penguin Classics. ISBN 978-0-14-044409-4.
- Keynes, Simon (1991). "The Historical Context of the Battle of Maldon". In Scragg, Donald (ed.). The Battle of Maldon AD 991. Oxford, UK: Basil Blackwell. pp. 81–113. ISBN 978-0-631-15987-2.
- Keynes, Simon (1994). "Cnut's Earls". In Rumble, Alexander (ed.). The Reign of Cnut, King of England, Denmark and Norway. London, UK: Leicester University Press. pp. 43–88. ISBN 978-0-7185-0205-8.
- Keynes, Simon (1997). "The Vikings in England c. 790 – 1016". In Sawyer, Peter (ed.). The Oxford Illustrated History of the Vikings. Oxford, UK: Oxford University Press. pp. 48–82. ISBN 978-0-19-820526-5.
- Keynes, Simon (2014a). "Anglo-Saxon Chronicle". In Lapidge, Michael; Blair, John; Keynes, Simon; Scragg, Donald (eds.). The Wiley Blackwell Encyclopedia of Anglo-Saxon England (2nd ed.). Chichester, West Sussex: Wiley Blackwell. pp. 37–39. ISBN 978-0-470-65632-7.
- Keynes, Simon (2014b). "Cnut". In Lapidge, Michael; Blair, John; Keynes, Simon; Scragg, Donald (eds.). The Wiley Blackwell Encyclopedia of Anglo-Saxon England (2nd ed.). Chichester, West Sussex: Wiley Blackwell. pp. 111–112. ISBN 978-0-470-65632-7.
- Keynes, Simon (2014c). "Encomium Emmae Reginae". In Lapidge, Michael; Blair, John; Keynes, Simon; Scragg, Donald (eds.). The Wiley Blackwell Encyclopedia of Anglo-Saxon England (2nd ed.). Chichester, West Sussex: Wiley Blackwell. p. 170. ISBN 978-0-470-65632-7.
- Keynes, Simon (2014d). "Swein Forkbeard". In Lapidge, Michael; Blair, John; Keynes, Simon; Scragg, Donald (eds.). The Wiley Blackwell Encyclopedia of Anglo-Saxon England (2nd ed.). Chichester, West Sussex: Wiley Blackwell. pp. 452–453. ISBN 978-0-470-65632-7.
- Keynes, Simon (2014e). "Vikings". In Lapidge, Michael; Blair, John; Keynes, Simon; Scragg, Donald (eds.). The Wiley Blackwell Encyclopedia of Anglo-Saxon England (2nd ed.). Chichester, West Sussex: Wiley Blackwell. pp. 479–480. ISBN 978-0-470-65632-7.
- Lavelle, Ryan (2008). Aethelred II: King of the English (2nd ed.). Stroud, UK: The History Press. ISBN 978-0-7524-4678-3.
- Lawson, M. K. (2011). Cnut: England's Viking King 1016-35 (2nd ed.). Stroud, UK: The History Press. ISBN 978-0-7524-6069-7. (1st edition published in 1993 as Cnut: the Danes in England in the Early Eleventh Century)
- Lawson, M. K. (2013). "Cnut [Canute] (d. 1035)". Oxford Dictionary of National Biography. Oxford University Press. doi:10.1093/ref:odnb/4579. (subscription, Wikipedia Library access or UK public library membership required)
- Licence, Tom, ed. (2014). Herman the Archdeacon and Goscelin of Saint-Bertin: Miracles of St Edmund. Oxford, UK: Clarendon Press. ISBN 978-0-19-968919-4.
- "The Life and Miracles of St. Edmund". New York: The Morgan Library & Museum. c. 1130. MS M.736 fol. 21v. Archived from the original on 11 December 2021.
- Loyn, Henry (2015). "Sweyn Forkbeard". In Cannon, John; Crowcroft, Robert (eds.). The Oxford Companion to British History (Second ed.). Oxford, UK: Oxford University Press. pp. 675–676. ISBN 978-0-19-967783-2.
- Lund, Niels (December 1986). "The Armies of Swein Forkbeard and Cnut: Leding or Lið?". Anglo-Saxon England. 15: 105–118. doi:10.1017/S0263675100003719. ISSN 0263-6751.
- Lund, Niels (1991). "The Danish Perspective". In Scragg, Donald (ed.). The Battle of Maldon AD 991. Oxford, UK: Basil Blackwell. pp. 114–142. ISBN 978-0-631-15987-2.
- Lund, Niels (1993). "Danish Military Organisation". In Cooper, Janet (ed.). The Battle of Maldon: Fiction and Fact. London, UK: The Hambledon Press. pp. 109–126. ISBN 978-1-85285-065-4.
- Lund, Niels (1994). "Cnut's Danish Kingdom". In Rumble, Alexander (ed.). The Reign of Cnut, King of England, Denmark and Norway. London, UK: Leicester University Press. pp. 27–42. ISBN 978-0-7185-0205-8.
- Lund, Niels (1997). "The Danish Empire and the End of the Viking Age". In Sawyer, Peter (ed.). The Oxford Illustrated History of the Vikings. Oxford, UK: Oxford University Press. pp. 156–181. ISBN 978-0-19-820526-5.
- Lund, Niels (2004). "Óláf [Óláfr] Tryggvason (d. 999)". Oxford Dictionary of National Biography. Oxford University Press. doi:10.1093/ref:odnb/49266. (subscription, Wikipedia Library access or UK public library membership required)
- Lund, Niels (2017). "Sven Estridsen's Incest and Divorce". Viking and Medieval Scandinavia. 13: 115–144. doi:10.1484/J.VMS.5.114353. ISSN 1782-7183.
- Miller, Sean (2011). "Edward [called Edward the Elder] (870s?–924), King of the Anglo-Saxons". Oxford Dictionary of National Biography. Oxford University Press. doi:10.1093/ref:odnb/8514. (subscription, Wikipedia Library access or UK public library membership required)
- Mynors, R. A. B.; Thomson, R. M.; Winterbottom, M., eds. (1998). William of Malmesbury: Gesta Regum Anglorum, The History of the English Kings (in Latin and English). Vol. I. Oxford, UK: Clarendon Press. ISBN 978-0-19-820678-1.
- Naismith, Rory (2014). "Money". In Lapidge, Michael; Blair, John; Keynes, Simon; Scragg, Donald (eds.). The Wiley Blackwell Encyclopedia of Anglo-Saxon England (Second ed.). Chichester, West Sussex: Wiley Blackwell. pp. 329–30. ISBN 978-0-470-65632-7.
- Naismith, Rory (2017). Britain and Ireland c. 400 – 1066. Medieval European Coinage: with a Catalogue of the Coins in the Fitzwilliam Museum, Cambridge. Vol. 8. Cambridge, UK: Cambridge University Press. ISBN 978-0-521-26016-9.
- O'Brien O'Keeffe, Katherine, ed. (2001). The Anglo-Saxon Chronicle, A Collaborative Edition, 5, MS C. Cambridge, UK: D. S. Brewer. ISBN 978-0-85991-491-8.
- Roach, Levi (2016). Æthelred the Unready. New Haven, Connecticut: Yale University Press. ISBN 978-0-300-22972-1.
- Roffey, Simon; Lavelle, Ryan (2016). "West Saxons and Danes: Negotiating Early Medieval Identities". In Lavelle, Ryan; Roffey, Simon (eds.). Danes in Wessex: The Scandinavian Impact on Southern England, c. 800 – c. 1100. Oxford, UK: Oxbow Books. pp. 7–34. ISBN 978-1-78297-931-9.
- Rumble, Alexander, ed. (1994). The Reign of Cnut, King of England, Denmark and Norway. London, UK: Leicester University Press. ISBN 978-0-7185-0205-8.
- Sawyer, Peter (1991). "Swein Forkbeard and the Historians". In Wood, Ian; Loud, G. A. (eds.). Church and Chronicle in the Middle Ages: Essays Presented to John Taylor. London, UK: The Hambledon Press. pp. 27–40. ISBN 978-1-85285-046-3.
- Sawyer, Peter (1993). "The Scandinavian Background". In Cooper, Janet (ed.). The Battle of Maldon: Fiction and Fact. London, UK: The Hambledon Press. pp. 33–42. ISBN 978-1-85285-065-4.
- Sawyer, Peter (1994). "Cnut's Scandinavian Empire". In Rumble, Alexander (ed.). The Reign of Cnut, King of England, Denmark and Norway. London, UK: Leicester University Press. pp. 10–26. ISBN 978-0-7185-0205-8.
- Sawyer, Peter (2004). "Swein [Sveinn Haraldsson, Sveinn Tjúguskegg, Swein Forkbeard] (d. 1014)". Oxford Dictionary of National Biography. Oxford University Press. doi:10.1093/ref:odnb/26830. (subscription, Wikipedia Library access or UK public library membership required)
- Stenton, Frank (1971). Anglo-Saxon England (3rd ed.). Oxford, UK: Oxford University Press. ISBN 978-0-19-821716-9.
- Warner, David, ed. (2001). Ottonian Germany: The Chronicon of Thietmar of Merseburg. Translated by Warner, David. Manchester, UK: Manchester University Press. ISBN 978-0-7190-4926-2.
- Whitelock, Dorothy, ed. (1930). Anglo-Saxon Wills. Cambridge, UK: Cambridge University Press. OCLC 786120891.
- Whitelock, Dorothy; Douglas, David; Tucker, Susie, eds. (1961). The Anglo-Saxon Chronicle. London, UK: Eyre and Spottiswoode. OCLC 317315404.
- Williams, Ann (2003). Æthelred the Unready: The Ill-Counselled King. London, UK: Hambledon and London. ISBN 978-1-85285-382-2.
- Williamson, David (2002). The National Portrait Gallery History of the Kings and Queens of England (revised ed.). London, UK: National Portrait Gallery Publications. ISBN 978-1-85514-228-2.
- Winroth, Anders (2012). The Conversion of Scandinavia: Vikings, Merchants and Missionaries in the Remaking of Northern Europe. New Haven, Connecticut: Yale University Press. ISBN 978-0-300-17026-9.

Regnal titles
Preceded by Harald Bluetooth	King of Denmark c. 986–1014	Succeeded by Harald II
Preceded by Æthelred the Unready	King of England; 1013–1014	Succeeded by Æthelred the Unready
