= Ashingdon =

Village and civil parish in Essex, England

Coordinates: 51.6028°N 0.6948°E

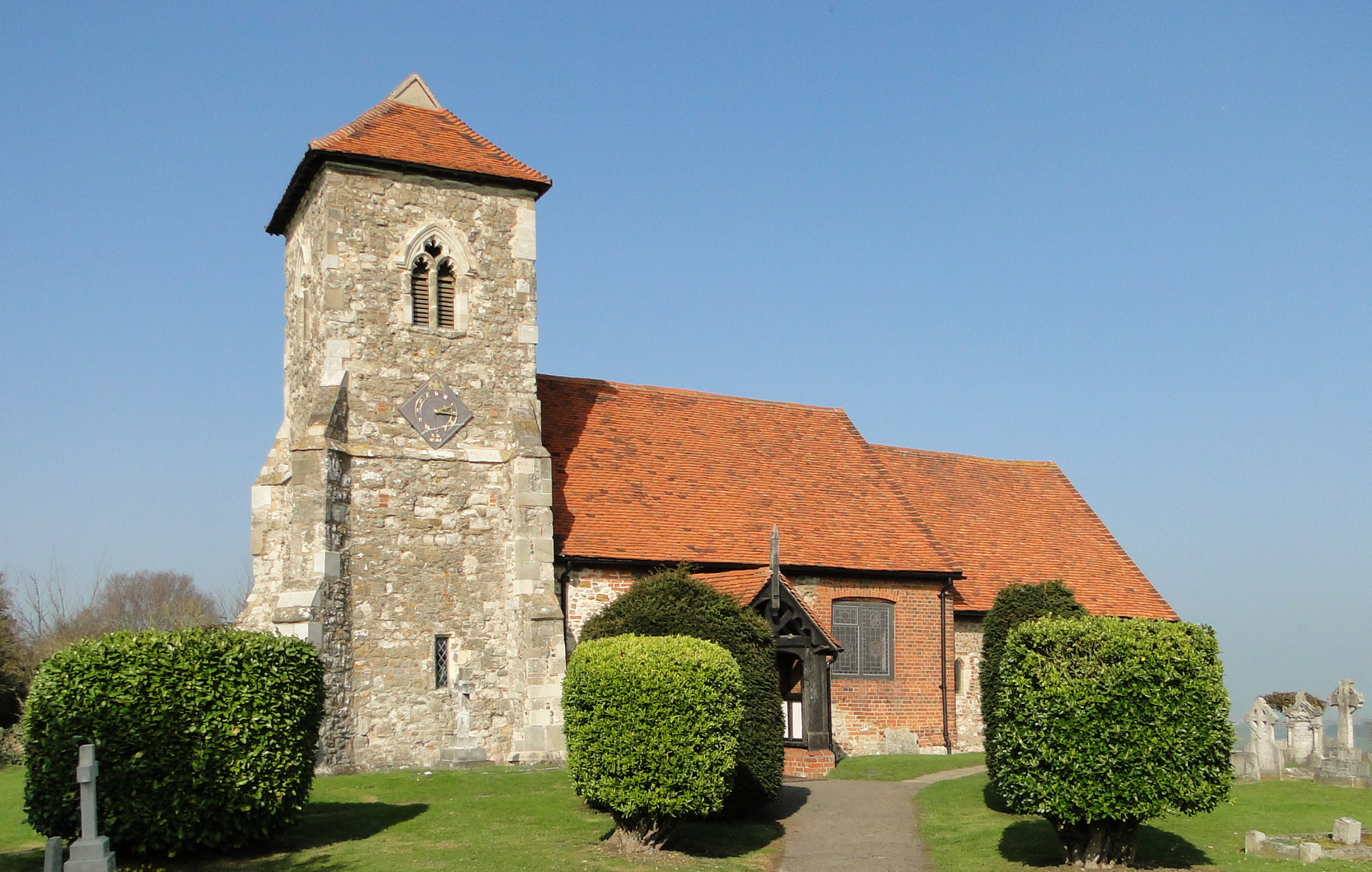
- St Andrew's Church, Ashingdon

- Location within Essex
- Population: 3,485 (Parish, 2021); 6,485 (Built up area, 2021)
- OS grid reference: TQ867927
- Civil parish: Ashingdon
- District: Rochford
- Shire county: Essex
- Region: East
- Country: England
- Sovereign state: United Kingdom
- Post town: ROCHFORD
- Postcode district: SS4
- Dialling code: 01702
- Police: Essex
- Fire: Essex
- Ambulance: East of England
- UK Parliament: Rayleigh
- Website: Ashingdon Parish Council

Ashingdon is a village and civil parish in the Rochford District of Essex, England. It lies immediately north of Rochford and 13 miles (21 km) south-east of Chelmsford. As well as Ashingdon itself, the parish also includes the small village of South Fambridge. The northern boundary of the parish is the tidal River Crouch. The Ashingdon built up area as defined by the Office for National Statistics extends beyond the parish boundary into the neighbouring parish of Hawkwell. At the 2021 census, the parish had a population of 3,485 and the Ashingdon built up area had a population of 6,485.

== History ==
Ashingdon and South Fambridge have been in existence for more than one thousand years and both appear in the Domesday Book of 1086, along with the Manor of Beckney within Ashingdon Parish.

=== Battle of Ashingdon ===
Ashingdon, or, more correctly, the land to the east of the village, is the presumed site of the Battle of Ashingdon on 18 October 1016. Ashingdon Hill is the likely location of King Edmund Ironside's camp, and it faces the field of battle between Ashingdon and Canewdon. Canewdon Church sits atop another hill, and beside Canewdon village was probably the site of King Canute's camp. Early chronicles report of fierce fighting at "Hyde Wood", nearly halfway between the two villages. The parish church which lies on Ashingdon Hill, one of the parish's three hills, was built in 1020, 4 years after the battle, by the order of the king, Canute the Great of Denmark. The grade II listed parish church of Saint Andrew's is also called "Ashingdon Minster". The first priest at Ashingdon was one of King Canute's personal priests, a young man named Stigand, who 46 years later was the Archbishop of Canterbury who crowned King Harold and officiated at the coronation of William The Conqueror (William I), both in 1066. The priest appears on the Bayeux Tapestry with the caption "STIGANT ARChIEPS." The church is now dedicated to Saint Andrew, but it is believed that it was dedicated earlier to Saint Michael, who was considered to be a military saint, and churches dedicated to him are frequently located on a hill. In 2006 Southend author, poet and historian, Ian Yearsley, wrote and published a commemorative epic poem about the battle, called The Battle of Ashingdon (1016).

=== Aviation ===
Ashingdon Parish was a centre of early aviation research from 1908. Britain's first aerodrome was officially opened in February 1909 and it was used for developing and flying early fixed wing aeroplanes. A few years later, early seaplanes were made there. The First World War stopped all of the aviation work until flying resumed in Ashingdon in 1919, possibly at Fambridge but also the aerodrome did move to Canewdon Road in Ashingdon, 2 miles away. The new company mainly used Avro 504 biplanes. In the early 1920s, Frank Neale started an aviation company there with a larger Avro 504 3 seater. Then in 1923, W.G. Pudney started The Essex Aviation Company flying several types of aircraft. All three firms used the Avro 504, a popular, easy and cheap to fly aircraft.

In the 1930s, the aerodrome may have moved further along Canewdon Road in Ashingdon. Some people say that it was moved by expanding into the larger adjacent field. Others say that it may have been at two separate locations in that road and others deny both suggestions and say that it was only ever at one place in Canewdon Road. The aerodrome was called Canute Aero Park, after King Canute the Great, as well as being called Ashingdon Aerodrome.

Ashingdon was the home of an aero club called "Aero 8", also home to the Essex Aviation Company, Premier Aviation and the Southend Flying Club. Many types of aircraft were designed, developed, built, flight tested and modified there, but many other types simply flew in and out of Ashingdon as a home base, way point or destination. Henri Mignet, the French designer of the Mignet HM.14 Pou du Ciel ("Flying Flea") used to visit Ashingdon for business with Aero 8 at Canute Aero Park, because they were one of the largest producers and developers of the Pou du Ciel. Aero 8's higher-powered and modified version was called "Super Pou". Several air shows took place in Ashingdon at the Canute Aero Park aerodrome. They were attended by thousands of visitors and scores of flying enthusiasts who flew in their aircraft. Later, the aerodrome moved to Ashingdon Road, then to Dalys Road, Rochford, where it was still called "Ashingdon Aerodrome". One Aero 8 Pou du Ciel ("Flying Flea") was called "Fleeing Fly".

On 20 June 1936, a DeHavilland biplane - a DH60X Moth, G-EBRT took off from Ashingdon Aerodrome in Canewdon Road and failed to gain sufficient altitude to fly over Ashingdon Minster on Ashingdon Hill. It crashed into the tall dense trees surrounding the churchyard and it came stuck intact in the branches at a height of about 10 metres (30 feet) above ground. The pilot was not injured and he climbed down the tree to firm ground. Some people in the village say that a "Flying Flea" also crashed into the churchyard trees.

Eventually, Southend Municipal Airport opened on the old Royal Flying Corps/RAF base and all flying moved to the new airport by the late 1930s. Soon it reverted to military use as RAF Rochford and it became a Battle of Britain RAF base as well as a pilot training airfield. After the Second World War, RAF Rochford became a civil airport again, now called London Southend Airport. So, early aviation has taken place at five successive locations in and around Ashingdon.

Early aviation pioneers and their aircraft that were developed at South Fambridge were: Eardley Billing, Gordon England, Green's Motor Patents, Handley Page, Lascelles Engines, Gerald Leake, Robert Macfie, W.O. Manning, Pemberton Billing, De Pischoff & Koechlin, Seaton Kerr, Talbot Quick, Howard Wright, Jose Weiss. Then in the 1930s: W.G. Pudney, Henri Mignet, Frank Neale, Mervyn Chadwick, Lascelles Motors, Raymond Gordon and many others.

Aircraft flying from Ashingdon Aerodrome were: Aeronca 100 and C2, Airspeed AS.4, Mignet HM.14 "Flying Flea", Aero 8 HM.14 Super Pou, HM.18, Avro 504K, Avro 594, Avro 616, Avro 638 "Club Cadet", Avro 642, BAC Drone, Blackburn Bluebird II, Bristol Bulldog, DH60 Moth, DH80A Puss Moth, Gloster Gauntlet, Handley Page W10, Handley Page "Dragon Rapide", Premier Gordon Dove, Simmonds Spartan, Short Scion I and II and many others.

During the Second World War, a lot of flying activity took place over Ashingdon because it was so near the coast, it was 3 miles from RAF Rochford and it was under the route from Nazi-occupied Europe to London. At least two RAF fighters crashed near the River Crouch, a German landmine landed in the River Crouch, several V1 flying bombs passed over the village, one exploded at Moons Farm and one failed to explode when it struck the sea-wall at Fambridge, and a USAAF B26 marauder bomber crashed near Moons Farm killing all on board.

== Governance ==
Ashingdon has a Parish Council.

Ashingdon was an ancient parish in the Rochford hundred of Essex. When elected parish and district councils were established under the Local Government Act 1894, Ashingdon was given a parish council and included in the Rochford Rural District. The rural district was replaced in 1974 with the larger Rochford District. South Fambridge was formerly a separate parish. It was absorbed into Ashingdon in 1946.

== Geography ==
The Ashingdon built up area as defined by the Office for National Statistics immediately adjoins the Rochford built up area to the south. The Ashingdon built up area extends beyond the parish boundary into the neighbouring parish of Hawkwell. Conversely, some north-eastern parts of the Hockley and Hawkwell built up area extend into Ashingdon parish.

== Links with Denmark ==
Ashingdon has had links in the past with Denmark. Prince Georg, the cousin of King Frederik IX, a senior member of the Danish royal family visited Ashingdon in January 1951. He came with diplomats from the Danish Embassy to commemorate and celebrate the Battle of Ashingdon in 1016. The Prince visited the Rectory, then Ashingdon Minster, the Parish Church - Saint Andrew's in the village which was built in 1020 on the orders of his ancestor, King Canute, King of England, Denmark and Norway. Prince Georg brought a flag of Denmark and a model of a Danish or Viking longship, an early sailing warship of the type used by King Canute (Knut) and his countrymen. The Danish flag and the Viking longship both still hang inside Saint Andrew's Church. Visits were made by Ashingdon villagers to Jelling in Denmark, the home of King Canute's family. Jelling also sent exchange visitors from Denmark to Ashingdon.

== Trivia ==
- Ashingdon was featured in a Weight Watchers advertisement in country lanes and in King George's Field, the village's playing field. There is an annual summer carnival here.

== Gallery ==
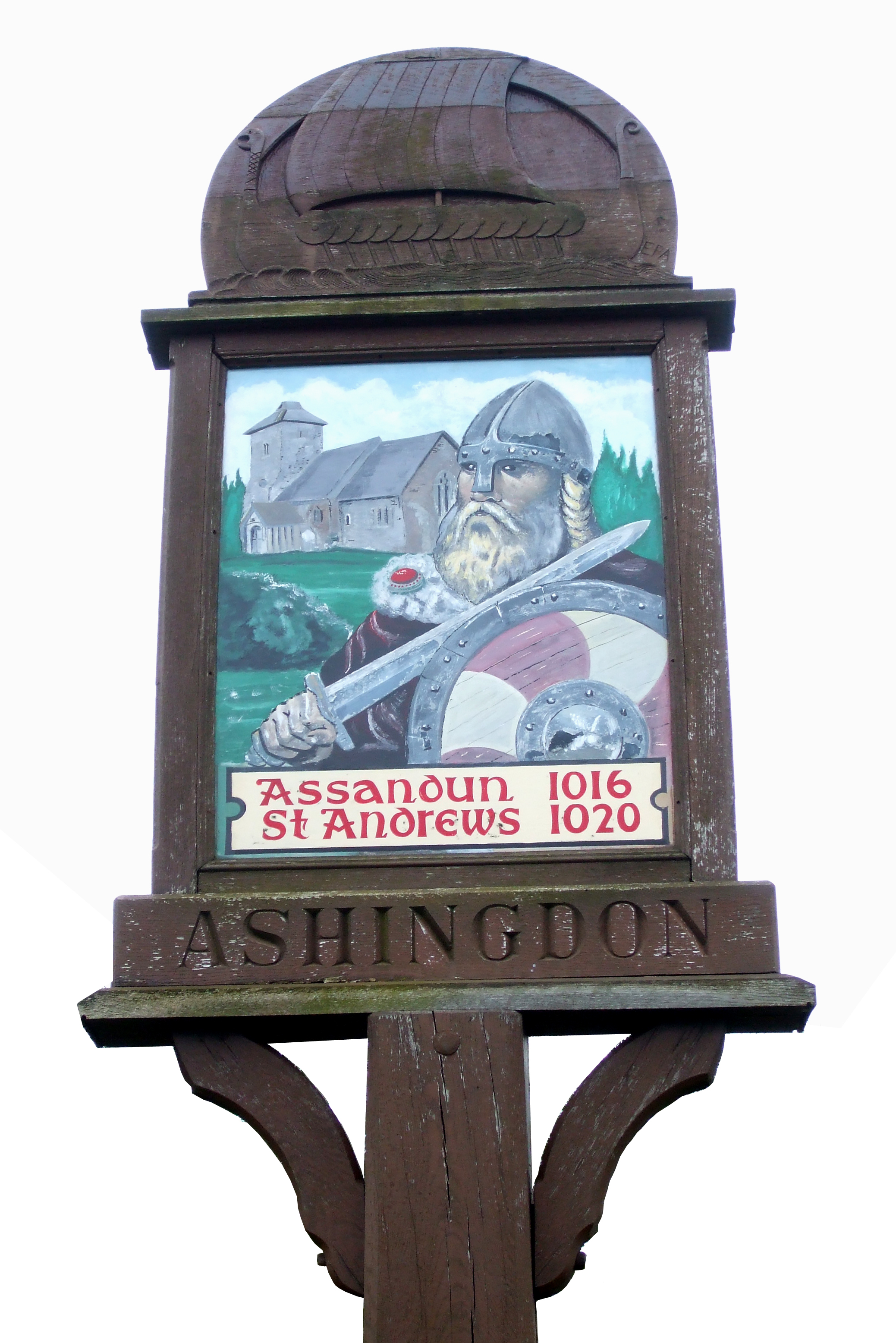
Village sign showing St Andrew's church and King Canute

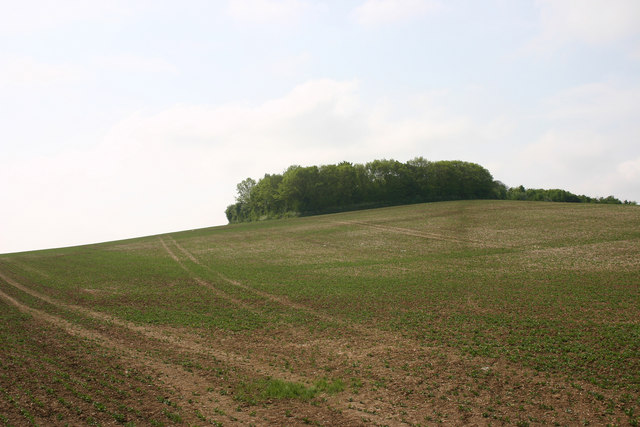
Ashingdon Hill, likely location of King Edmund's camp.

== Bibliography ==
- Ellis, Ken; Jones, Geoff. 1990. Henri Mignet and his Flying Fleas. Haynes Publishing ISBN 0-85429-765-0
