= Gytha (princess) =

Danish princess

- Danish princess
- Born: 10th century
- Died: 11th century
- Spouse: Eiríkr Hákonarson
- House: House of Knýtlinga
- Father: Sweyn Forkbeard

Gytha or Gyda (Danish: Gyda Svendsdatter) was a Danish princess, daughter of King Sweyn Forkbeard, who ruled Denmark, England, and Norway. (Note: Morawiec (2004, p. 27) calls Gytha the sister of Sweyn Forkbeard.)

She belonged to the Scylding dynasty, descended from Gorm the Old and Thyra. She was most likely the half-sister of King Cnut of England and the wife of the deposed Jarl of Lade, Eiríkr Hákonarson, who commanded Swedish forces at the Battle of Svolder (also known as the Battle of Øresund).

== Biography ==
=== Origin ===
Gytha was most likely the daughter of Sweyn Forkbeard, King of Denmark, and the granddaughter of Harald Bluetooth. The identity of her mother is uncertain. The only wife of Sweyn known by name is Sigrid the Haughty. However, she was not Gytha's mother, as Sweyn married her only around 996, while Gytha was already married by about 997. It is presumed that Gytha's mother was either Sweyn's first, unnamed wife or his concubine. According to one hypothesis, her mother might have been Gunhilda, possibly of Obotrite origin.

Gytha was probably the half-sister of King Cnut of England, King Harald II of Denmark, Estrid Svendsdatter, and Świętosława.

=== Marriage to Jarl Eiríkr ===
The marriage of Gytha and Jarl Eiríkr was noted under the year 996 by Snorri Sturluson in the 13th-century Saga of Olaf Tryggvason. However, the date of the wedding given by Sturluson is questioned by historians. It is believed that the marriage took place between 995 and 1000, most likely around 997. In 995, after his father's death, Eiríkr was deposed by Olaf Tryggvason and, together with his brother Sweyn, fled to Sweden, and a year later to Denmark. There, he married Gytha and became an ally of Sweyn Forkbeard in his fight against Olaf Tryggvason. Eiríkr also had the support of King Olof Skötkonung of Sweden, who was the brother-in-law of his brother Sweyn. In 1000, with the help of Sweyn and Olof, Eiríkr, commanding Swedish forces, defeated Tryggvason in the Battle of Svolder. He likely died around 1023.

The later fate of Eiríkr's wife, Gytha, as well as the date of her death, is unknown.

=== Offspring ===
According to Snorri Sturluson, a year after Gytha and Eiríkr's wedding, their son Haakon was born. According to his account, Haakon was born in 997, but historians place his birth around 998. He was the only child from this marriage. Around 1016, he left Norway after being captured by King Olaf II. He went to England, where he found refuge with King Cnut. In 1029, he married Cnut's niece, Gunhilde, daughter of the Slavic prince Wrytgeorn and possibly Świętosława.

=== Historical authenticity ===
The Polish historian Jakub Morawiec questions Gytha's historicity. He suggests that she may have been created by saga authors to justify Sweyn Forkbeard's alliance with the sons of Jarl Haakon Sigurdsson.

== Gytha's family tree ==
Note: (Note: Only the most important figures are listed in the family tree. The marriages of some members of the dynasty have been omitted.)

Tove of the Obotrites or Gunhilde	Harald Bluetooth
Gunhilde of the Oborites?	Sweyn Forkbeard	Sigrid the Haughty	Haakon	Tyra of Denmark	Gunhilde
Gytha	Eiríkr Hákonarson	Cnut	Harald II of Denmark	Świętosława (wife of Wyrtgeorn?)	Estrid Svendsdatter
Haakon Ericsson	Gunhilde
Botylda	Ulf

== Bibliography ==
- Balzer, Oswald (2005). Genealogia Piastów [Genealogy of the Piasts] (in Polish). Kraków: Avalon. ISBN 83-918497-0-8.
- Morawiec, Jakub (2004). "Kilka uwag dotyczących okoliczności i przebiegu bitwy w Øresundzie w 1000 roku" [A Few Remarks on the Circumstances and Course of the Battle of Øresund in the Year 1000]. In Panic, Idzi; Sperka, Jerzy (eds.). Średniowiecze polskie i powszechne [Polish and Universal Middle Ages] (in Polish). Vol. 3. Kraków: Wydawnictwo Uniwersytetu Śląskiego. ISBN 83-226-1377-6.
- Morawiec, Jakub (2013). Knut Wielki. Król Anglii, Danii i Norwegii (ok. 995–1035) [Cnut: King of England, Denmark, and Norway (c. 995–1035)] (in Polish). Kraków: Avalon. ISBN 978-83-7730-070-1.
