= Ulfcytel =

Anglo-Saxon nobleman (died 1016)

Ulfcytel (Note: Ulfcytel is the most common spelling of his name, but there are several variant ones, including Ulfcetel, Ulfkell and Ulfkell Snilling, and Ulfketel 'Snilling'.) (died 1016) was an early eleventh-century East Anglian military leader. He commanded East Anglian forces in a battle in 1004 against Danish Viking invaders led by Swein Forkbeard; although he lost, the Danes said that "they never met worse fighting in England than Ulfcytel dealt to them". He led a local English army to another defeat in the Battle of Ringmere in 1010 and died in 1016 in the Battle of Assandun. He exercised the powers of an ealdorman, the second highest rank in Anglo-Saxon England; to the puzzlement of historians, he was never formally given the title.

Ulfcytel was a greatly respected English military leader during the reign of Æthelred the Unready (978–1013 and 1014–1016), in which ineffective opposition to Danish Viking invasions ended in the Danish conquest of England. Ulfcytel is highly praised in the Anglo-Saxon Chronicle and Scandinavian skaldic poetry, and also by Anglo-Norman writers and modern historians. Scandinavian sources gave him the byname snilling, meaning "bold", and the court poet Sigvatr Þórðarson called East Anglia "Ulfkell's Land" after him. The etymology of his name is Scandinavian, but his origin and background are unknown. According to one source, he was married to a daughter of King Æthelred, although historians disagree whether the claim is credible.

== Sources ==
Ulfcytel was a respected military leader at the beginning of the eleventh century, during the reign of Æthelred the Unready, and the main source for the period is manuscript C of the Anglo-Saxon Chronicle (ASC C), but it is based on a version written between 1016 and 1023, after Æthelred's death and the Danish conquest of England. (Note: The Anglo-Saxon Chronicle, often abbreviated as the Chronicle, is a term of convenience used by modern scholars to describe a set of annals which are the most important source for Anglo-Saxon history. The lost original compilation, known as the 'common stock', was written in the 890s, probably at the court of Alfred the Great. This has been added to in the various recensions, known as ASC A to F, which are usually presented as detached reporting, but reflect the location, political views and interests of the authors. Manuscripts D and E are based on the same source as C and are mainly duplicates of C for the period between 983 and 1016.) Since the 1970s historians have become increasingly sceptical of the reliability of the account in ASC C, seeing it as biased by knowledge of the disastrous outcome of Æthelred's reign. The historian Levi Roach comments that "foreknowledge of the eventual English defeats haunts [the author's] writing at every turn". ASC C attributes the defeat to English incompetence and cowardice, which is blamed on Æthelred's lieutenants rather than on the king himself. Another important source for Anglo-Saxon history is the corpus of charters, usually grants by the king of land or privileges to a people or religious houses. Ulfcytel's attestations of charters provide crucial information about him and his status. Many surviving charters are forgeries by religious houses purporting to demonstrate an entitlement to specific rights or to title of lands.

Ulfcytel is recorded extensively in skaldic verse, which is mainly devoted to the praise and criticism of Scandinavian kings and other leaders. This allusive and enigmatic poetry was first written down in the late twelfth century, and the historian Russell Poole comments that it "borders on the intractable as a source for the historian of the British Isles". He nevertheless argues that some information in it not found elsewhere "has a general plausibility that encourages acceptance", and that historians cannot afford to ignore it in view of the deficiencies of the Chronicle for the period.

== Background ==
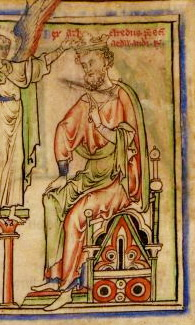
Æthelred the Unready portrayed in the mid-thirteenth century Vie de Seint Aedward le Rei (Life of Saint Edward the King)

England suffered from foreign invasions from the early ninth century to the 950s, but there was then a generation of peace. Danish Viking attacks resumed early in the reign of Æthelred the Unready (Note: The Old English name Æthel-ræd means noble counsel, and in the twelfth century critics changed the name to un-ræd, meaning ill-counsel. This later became unredi, meaning "unready", resulting in Æthelred's modern byname.) (978–1013 and 1014–1016), with small-scale raids in the 980s. In 991, a Danish fleet began a sustained campaign on the south-east coast of England. The Vikings occupied Northey Island, in the estuary of the River Blackwater, and Byrhtnoth, ealdorman of Essex, brought an army to challenge the invaders. The result was a defeat for the English at the Battle of Maldon and the death of Byrhtnoth. He was the second most senior ealdorman (the highest rank of the aristocracy after the king), and Roach comments that his defeat and death "sent shockwaves throughout the realm". The King and his councillors decided to give a tribute to the Danes of 10,000 pounds to leave England, but they soon returned, and further invasions and payments of tribute followed in the 990s. (Note: Calculating the modern value of Anglo-Saxon money is very difficult, particularly as the purchase power of the penny varied at different times and places, but 10,000 pounds is 2,400,000 pence, and each penny was probably equivalent to several tens of modern pounds sterling.) In 1001 the Vikings ravaged southern England, and the following year they were paid a tribute of 24,000 pounds. In 1003 a Danish army under Swein Forkbeard, who was to be very briefly king of England in 1013–1014, was active in the south-west.

== Name and status ==
Ulfcytel is first recorded as a witness to charters (grants of land and privileges) in 1002. By 1004 he was the dominant figure in East Anglia, and he held this status until his death in 1016, but his origin and background are unknown. He carried out the functions of an ealdorman, but he attested charters as a minister (the Latin for thegn), the third rank of the aristocracy. Ealdormen were local rulers acting in the king's name and on his behalf, and leading men in battle. The historians Levi Roach and Lucy Marten describe him as the de facto ealdorman of East Anglia, and Anglo-Norman historians describe him as an earl, which replaced the term ealdorman shortly after Ulfcytel's death.

Æthelred often left ealdormanries vacant for long periods and relied on reeves and high-reeves to carry out their duties; Roach suggests that Ulfcytel may have held one of these positions. The historian Ryan Lavelle comments that Æthelred may have kept the East Anglian ealdormanry vacant because the previous holder of the position, Æthelwine, had been troublesome. The etymology of Ulfcytel's name is Scandinavian, and Marten suggests that he might have been a Danish Viking in English service, which could explain why he was not formally appointed an ealdorman.

== Military career ==
Ulfcytel is first mentioned in the Chronicle in entries for 1004, which state that Swein brought his fleet to Norwich and destroyed the town. Ulfcytel and the councillors of the East Anglians decided that, as he had not had time to gather his army, it would be best to buy off the Danes before they did more damage. A truce was agreed, but the Danes broke it and headed from their ships to Thetford. Ulfcytel ordered the ships to be destroyed, but those charged with the task failed to carry it out. The Danes ravaged Thetford, and on their way back to their ships they were met by Ulfcytel and a hastily assembled army. Many fell on both sides, but the Danish army got back to their ships. According to the Chronicle, the Danes would not have escaped if the East Anglians had been able to assemble their whole army, and the Danes said that "they never met worse fighting in England than Ulfcytel dealt to them". The military historian Richard Abels comments: "The Danes gained a pyrrhic victory; badly mauled, they withdrew to their ships." Abels sees the ability of Ulfcytel to operate independently, without seeking the consent of the king, as an example of the viceregal powers of great local magnates under Æthelred. Although payment of tribute to the Vikings was common, it was almost always criticised when discussed in the Chronicle. The historian Ann Williams comments that its portrayal of Ulfcytel's decision as sensible is a notable exception which shows the Chronicle's partiality for Ulfcytel compared with other magnates who are condemned for paying tribute.

A Danish Viking army led by Thorkell the Tall spent the winter in 1009–1010 in Kent and Essex. After Easter it went to East Anglia and heard that Ulfcytel was camped with an army at Ringmere in East Wretham, 5 miles (8 kilometres) north-east of Thetford. (Note: The Chronicle does not give the location of Ulfcytel's army, but John of Worcester gives it as Ringmere and Scandinavian poems locate it at Ringmere Heath. The Victorian historian W. H. Stevenson identified Ringmere with Ringmere Pit in East Wretham, and his view is accepted by modern historians.) The Danes went to East Wretham to challenge Ulfcytel's army of men of East Anglia and Cambridgeshire, and the Battle of Ringmere was fought on 5 May. (Note: The Chronicle dates the battle to Ascension Day, which was 18 May, but John of Worcester dates it to 5 May, and this is supported by the dating of the death of Oswig, who died in the battle. The Ely Calendar lists his death on 5 May.) The East Anglians fled at the start of the battle, but the men of Cambridgeshire stood firm. The Anglo-Saxons suffered a heavy defeat and lost many of their leaders; the Danes then ravaged East Anglia and burnt down Thetford and Cambridge. Williams sees the invasion in 1010 as a "grudge attack", revenge for the mauling the Danes had suffered in 1004.

King Æthelred died in April 1016 and was succeeded by his son Edmund Ironside (April to November 1016), who contested the throne with Swein's son Cnut in a series of battles over the following months. Ulfcytel is not mentioned in the Chronicle in its account of the battles of 1016, apart from his death, but Scandinavian skaldic poems present him as one of the leaders of Anglo-Saxon forces in the last stage of English resistance, and the contemporary Liðsmannaflokkr praises his role. The historians Alistair Campbell and Russell Poole accept that Scandinavian descriptions of Ulfcytel's role probably have a historical basis. Poole writes:

The reference to Ulfcytel's presence at or near London in Liðsmannaflokkr cannot be regarded as corroboration of a totally independent kind. Nevertheless, we may tentatively conclude that Ulfcytel's part in the 1015–1016 war was not confined to East Anglia, where his exact rank and power are in any case uncertain, and that like Eirikr jarl, he played a more wide-ranging role. His contribution may have become overshadowed by Edmund's in the Anglo-Saxon Chronicle account.

The Danes besieged London in the summer of 1016, and skaldic poems describe an inconclusive battle west of London in which Ulfcytel was wounded while leading the English army. Poole comments that the difficulty with this account is that the Chronicle states that Edmund Ironside commanded the English forces during the siege, but it is not known who took over when he left for Wessex, and it may have been Ulfcytel. Poole states that in the Liðsmannaflokkr, "Æthelred and his son Edmund are completely ignored in favour of Ulfcytel: an awareness that from the outset he was the Vikings' staunchest and ablest opponent may be implied".

Ulfcytel was one of several English leaders who were killed in the English defeat at the Battle of Assandun on 18 October 1016. Cnut and Edmund then agreed to divide the kingdom, but Cnut became king of the whole realm following Edmund's death shortly afterwards. According to the Supplement to Jómsvíkinga saga, preserved in the late fourteenth-century Flateyjarbók, Thorkell the Tall killed Ulfcytel in revenge for the death of his brother. Abels comments that it is impossible to know whether this is true. (Note: Abels also mentions a statement by the thirteenth-century Icelandic historian Snorri Sturluson in the Heimskringla that Ulfcytel was killed by another lieutenant of Cnut, Eiríkr Hákonarson, but according to the historian Alistair Campbell this was based on a misunderstanding by Sturluson of a description in the Eiríksdrápa of a battle west of London said to have been fought between Eirikr and Ulfcytel.)

== Civilian life ==
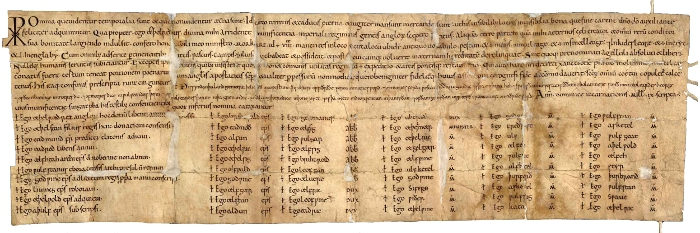
Charter S 922 dated 1009 with the attestation of Ulfcytel sixth down in the fourth column

Williams writes that "as well as being a great warrior, Ulfcytel was a pious man and a benefactor of Bury St Edmunds [Abbey]". In an undated charter, he granted estates at Rickinghall, Rougham, Woolpit, Hinderclay and Redgrave, all in Suffolk, to the abbey. (Note: A charter of Cnut in favour of Bury St Edmunds Abbey, dating to around 1022, refers to a fishery formerly the property of Ulfcytel in the conjoined villages of Upwell and Outwell in Norfolk. However, the charter is regarded by most authorities as a later fabrication.) He is probably the Ulfcytel who was a previous owner of a silver-hilted sword which Æthelred's eldest son, Æthelstan, bequeathed to his father in his will in 1014. Ulfcytel attested charters as a thegn between 1002 and 1016, and from 1013 he was listed as the first in that rank.

According to the Supplement to Jómsvíkinga Saga, his wife was Wulfhild, a daughter of King Æthelred, and she married Thorkell the Tall after he killed Ulfcytel. Historians regard this late source as unreliable and some think that it is unlikely that Ulfcytel married a daughter of Æthelred, but others regard the claim as plausible.

== Reputation ==
Ulfcytel has a high reputation in contemporary sources and among Anglo-Norman historians. Contemporary Scandinavian sources gave him the byname snilling, meaning valiant or bold, and the court poet Sigvatr Þórðarson called East Anglia "Ulfkell's Land" after him. The twelfth-century historian William of Malmesbury singled him out as the only leader who energetically resisted the invaders. Marten comments:

In the Anglo-Saxon Chronicle annals for the reign of Æthelred, references to East Anglia are linked with the heroic exploits of its military commander, Ulfcytel. Ulfcytel is an interesting character, not least because we read as much about him in Scandinavian skaldic verse as we do in English sources ... Ulfcytel earned an enviable reputation as a warrior throughout the Scandinavian world.

Modern historians also have a high respect for him. In Abels's view: "Although Ulfcytel was on the losing side of all three battles he fought against the Danes, his tenacity and fierce courage won him the respect of his enemies and the admiration of the author of this section of the Anglo-Saxon Chronicle."

== Sources ==
- Abels, Richard (1988). Lordship and Military Obligation in Anglo-Saxon England. Berkeley, California: University of California Press. ISBN 978-0-520-05794-4.
- Abels, Richard (2004). "Ulfcytel [Ulfcytel Snillingr] (d. 1016)". Oxford Dictionary of National Biography. Oxford University Press. doi:10.1093/ref:odnb/27984. (subscription, Wikipedia Library access or UK public library membership required)
- Ashdown, Margaret, ed. (1930). English and Norse Documents Relating to the Reign of Ethelred the Unready. Cambridge, UK: Cambridge University Press. OCLC 458533078.
- Bolton, Timothy (2017). Cnut the Great. New Haven, Connecticut: Yale University Press. ISBN 978-0-300-20833-7.
- Campbell, Alistair, ed. (1949). Encomium Emmae Reginae. London, UK: Royal Historical Society. OCLC 1067634827.
- "Charter S 922". The Electronic Sawyer: Online Catalogue of Anglo-Saxon Charters. London: King's College London.
- "Charter S 980". The Electronic Sawyer: Online Catalogue of Anglo-Saxon Charters. London: King's College London.
- "Charter S 1219". The Electronic Sawyer: Online Catalogue of Anglo-Saxon Charters. London: King's College London.
- "Charter S 1503". The Electronic Sawyer: Online Catalogue of Anglo-Saxon Charters. London: King's College London.
- Darlington, Reginald; McGurk, Patrick, eds. (1995). The Chronicle of John of Worcester (in Latin and English). Vol. 2. Oxford, UK: Clarendon Press. ISBN 978-0-19-822261-3.
- Hart, Cyril (1966). The Early Charters of Eastern England. Leicester: Leicester University Press. OCLC 906100607.
- Hart, Cyril (1975). The Early Charters of Northern England and the North Midlands. Leicester: Leicester University Press. ISBN 978-0-7185-1131-9.
- Jesch, Judith (2012). "Sigvatr Þórðarson, Víkingarvísur 7". In Whaley, Diana (ed.). Poetry from the Kings' Sagas 1: From Mythical Times to c. 1035. Skaldic Poetry of the Scandinavian Middle Ages. Turnhout: Brepols. p. 544. ISBN 978-2-503-51896-1.
- Keynes, Simon (1980). The Diplomas of King Æthelred the Unready 978-1016. Cambridge, UK: Cambridge University Press. ISBN 978-0-521-02308-5.
- Keynes, Simon (2002). An Atlas of Attestations in Anglo-Saxon Charters, c.670-1066. Cambridge, UK: Dept. of Anglo-Saxon, Norse, and Celtic, University of Cambridge, UK. ISBN 978-0-9532697-6-1.
- Keynes, Simon (2009). "Æthelred II [Ethelred; known as Ethelred the Unready] (c. 966x8–1016)". Oxford Dictionary of National Biography. Oxford University Press. doi:10.1093/ref:odnb/8915. (subscription, Wikipedia Library access or UK public library membership required)
- Keynes, Simon (2014a). "Anglo-Saxon Chronicle". In Lapidge, Michael; Blair, John; Keynes, Simon; Scragg, Donald (eds.). The Wiley Blackwell Encyclopedia of Anglo-Saxon England (2nd ed.). Chichester, West Sussex: Wiley Blackwell. pp. 37–39. ISBN 978-0-470-65632-7.
- Keynes, Simon (2014b). "Charters and Writs". In Lapidge, Michael; Blair, John; Keynes, Simon; Scragg, Donald (eds.). The Wiley Blackwell Encyclopedia of Anglo-Saxon England (2nd ed.). Chichester, West Sussex: Wiley Blackwell. pp. 102–103. ISBN 978-0-470-65632-7.
- Keynes, Simon (2014c). "Thegn". In Lapidge, Michael; Blair, John; Keynes, Simon; Scragg, Donald (eds.). The Wiley Blackwell Encyclopedia of Anglo-Saxon England (2nd ed.). Chichester, West Sussex: Wiley Blackwell. pp. 459–461. ISBN 978-0-470-65632-7.
- Lavelle, Ryan (2008). Aethelred II: King of the English (2nd ed.). Stroud, UK: The History Press. ISBN 978-0-7524-4678-3.
- Marten, Lucy (February 2008). "The Shiring of East Anglia: an Alternative Hypothesis". Historical Research. 81 (211): 1–27. ISSN 0950-3471.
- Mynors, R. A. B.; Thomson, R. M.; Winterbottom, M., eds. (1998). William of Malmesbury: Gesta Regum Anglorum, The History of the English Kings (in Latin and English). Vol. I. Oxford, UK: Clarendon Press. ISBN 978-0-19-820678-1.
- Naismith, Rory (2014). "Money". In Lapidge, Michael; Blair, John; Keynes, Simon; Scragg, Donald (eds.). The Wiley Blackwell Encyclopedia of Anglo-Saxon England (Second ed.). Chichester, West Sussex: Wiley Blackwell. pp. 329–330. ISBN 978-0-470-65632-7.
- Poole, Russell (April 1987). "Skaldic Verse and Anglo-Saxon History: Some Aspects of the Period 1009-1016". Speculum. 62 (2): 265–298. doi:10.2307/2855227. ISSN 2040-8072. JSTOR 2855227.
- Poole, Russell (1991). Viking Poems on War and Peace: A Study in Skaldic Narrative. Toronto, Canada: University of Toronto Press. ISBN 978-0-8020-5867-6.
- Roach, Levi (2016). Æthelred the Unready. New Haven, Connecticut: Yale University Press. ISBN 978-0-300-22972-1.
- Robertson, Agnes, ed. (1956). Anglo-Saxon Charters (2nd ed.). Cambridge, UK: Cambridge University Press. OCLC 504288415.
- Ryan, Martin J. (2013). "The Age of Æthelred". In Higham, Nicholas J.; Ryan, Martin J. (eds.). The Anglo-Saxon World. New Haven, Connecticut: Yale University Press. pp. 335–373. ISBN 978-0-300-12534-4.
- Stafford, Pauline (1989). Unification and Conquest. A Political and Social History of England in the Tenth and Eleventh Centuries. London, UK: Edward Arnold. ISBN 978-0-7131-6532-6.
- Stafford, Pauline (2014). "Ealdorman". In Lapidge, Michael; Blair, John; Keynes, Simon; Scragg, Donald (eds.). The Wiley Blackwell Encyclopedia of Anglo-Saxon England (2nd ed.). Chichester, West Sussex: Wiley Blackwell. pp. 156–157. ISBN 978-0-470-65632-7.
- Stenton, Frank (1971) [1943]. Anglo-Saxon England (3rd ed.). Oxford, UK: Oxford University Press. ISBN 978-0-19-821716-9.
- Stevenson, W. H. (April 1896). "Notes on Old-English Historical Geography". English Historical Review. 11 (42): 301–304. ISSN 0013-8266.
- Whitelock, Dorothy, ed. (1930). Anglo-Saxon Wills. Cambridge, UK: Cambridge University Press. OCLC 786120891.
- Whitelock, Dorothy, ed. (1979). English Historical Documents, Volume 1, c. 500–1042 (2nd ed.). London, UK: Routledge. ISBN 978-0-415-14366-0.
- Williams, Ann (1991). "Ulfkell Snilling thegn d. 1016". In Williams, Ann; Smyth, Alfred P.; Kirby, D. P. (eds.). A Biographical Dictionary of Dark Age Britain. London, UK: Seaby. p. 231. ISBN 978-1-85264-047-7.
- Williams, Ann (2002). "Thegnly Piety and Ecclesiastical Patronage in the Late Old English Kingdom". Anglo-Norman Studies. XXIV: 1–24. ISSN 0954-9927.
- Williams, Ann (2003). Æthelred the Unready: The Ill-Counselled King. London, UK: Hambledon and London. ISBN 978-1-85285-382-2.
- Williams, Ann (2016). "Thorkell the Tall and the Bubble Reputation: The Vicissitudes of Fame". In Lavelle, Ryan; Roffey, Simon (eds.). Danes in Wessex: The Scandinavian Impact on Southern England c.800-c.1100. Oxford, UK: Oxbow Books. pp. 144–157. ISBN 978-1-78297-931-9.
