= Battle of Ringmere =

1010 Danish victory in England

Battle of Ringmere Heath
- Part of the Viking invasions of England
Location	Near Ipswich 52°20′52″N 0°44′29″E
Result	Danish victory

Belligerents
Anglo-Saxons	Danish Vikings

Commanders and leaders
Ulfcytel	Thorkell the Tall; Possibly Olaf Haraldsson

The Battle of Ringmere was fought on 5 May 1010 between an East Anglian contingent led by Ulfcytel and a Danish army under Thorkell the Tall. Norse sagas recorded a battle at Hringmaraheiðr; Old English Hringmere-hǣð, modern name Ringmere Heath.

The Anglo-Saxon chronicle records that the English were routed by the flight of Thurcytel "Mare's head", and only the men of Cambridgeshire stood to fight.

John of Worcester records that the Danes defeated the English. Over a three-month period the Danes wasted East Anglia, burning Thetford and Cambridge.

In his Víkingarvísur, the poet Sigvat records the victory of Saint Olaf, fighting alongside Thorkell the Tall:

Enn lét sjaunda sinni
sverðþing háit verða
endr á Ulfkels landi
Ôleifr, sem ferk máli.
Stóð Hringmaraheiði
(herfall vas þar,) alla
Ellu kind (es olli
arfvǫrðr Haralds starfi).

Yet again Óláfr caused a sword-assembly [BATTLE] to be held for the seventh time in Ulfcytel's land, as I recount the tale. The offspring of Ælla [= Englishmen] stood over all Ringmere Heath; there was slaying of the army there, where the guardian of Haraldr's inheritance [= Óláfr] caused exertion.
