= South Fambridge =

Village in Essex, England

Coordinates: 51.630862°N 0.678509°E

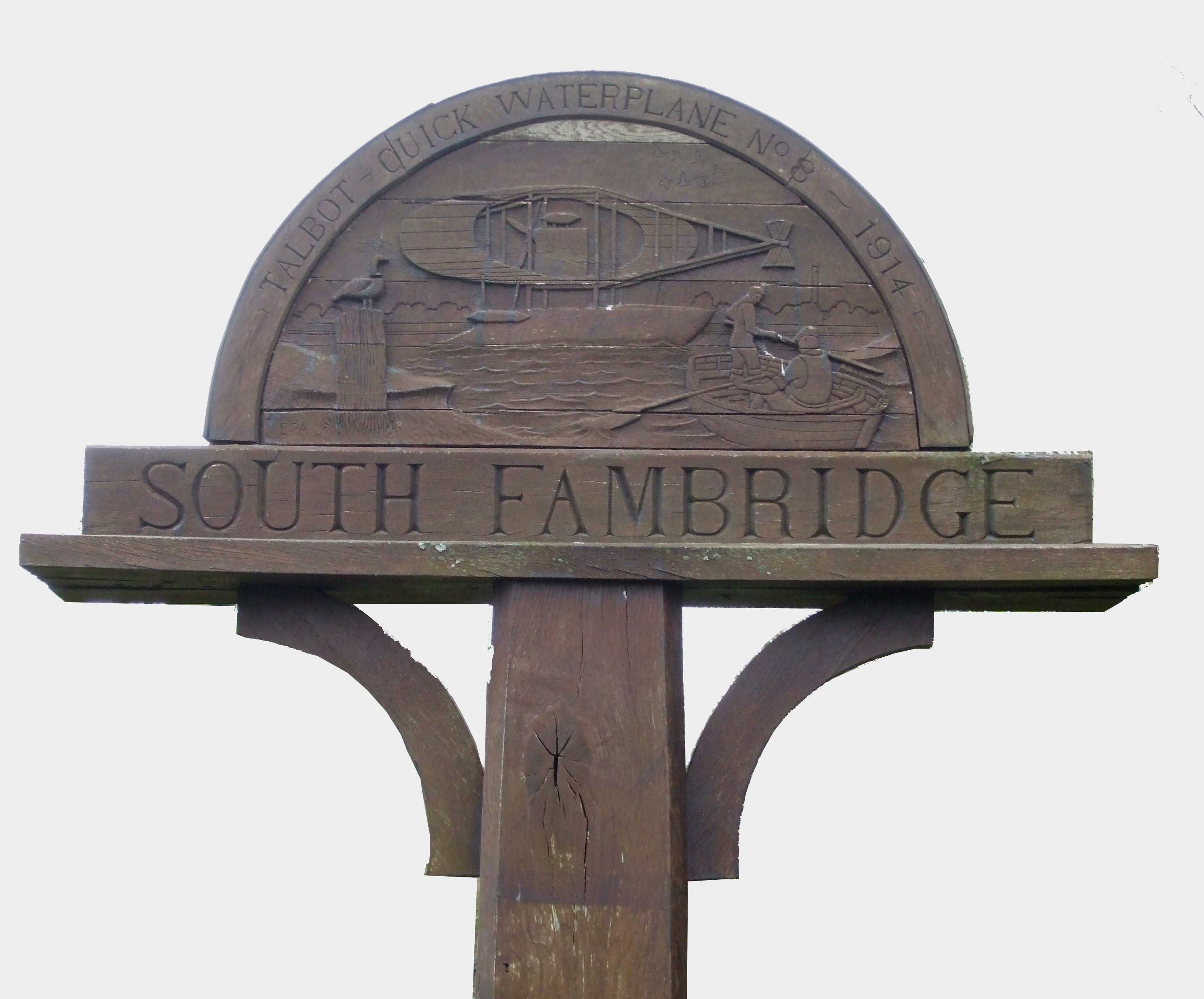
- South Fambridge Village Sign

- Location within Essex
- OS grid reference: TQ854959
- Civil parish: Ashingdon
- District: Rochford
- Shire county: Essex
- Region: East
- Country: England
- Sovereign state: United Kingdom
- Post town: Rochford
- Postcode district: SS
- Dialling code: 01702
- Police: Essex
- Fire: Essex
- Ambulance: East of England
- UK Parliament: Rayleigh

South Fambridge is a village in the civil parish of Ashingdon, in the Rochford district of Essex, England. It lies close to the south bank of the River Crouch, opposite North Fambridge on the north bank. Despite the name, there is no bridge between the two Fambridges today.

== History ==
The name Fambridge comes from the Old English "fen bridge" meaning a bridge (possibly in the sense of a causeway) in the fen or marshland. The River Crouch here was historically wider and shallower than it is today. It is thought that in Roman times there may have been a bridge between North and South Fambridge, although the crossing may have been a ford. As the river became deeper, the crossing between the Fambridges was replaced by a ferry, which ran from medieval times until the mid-20th century.

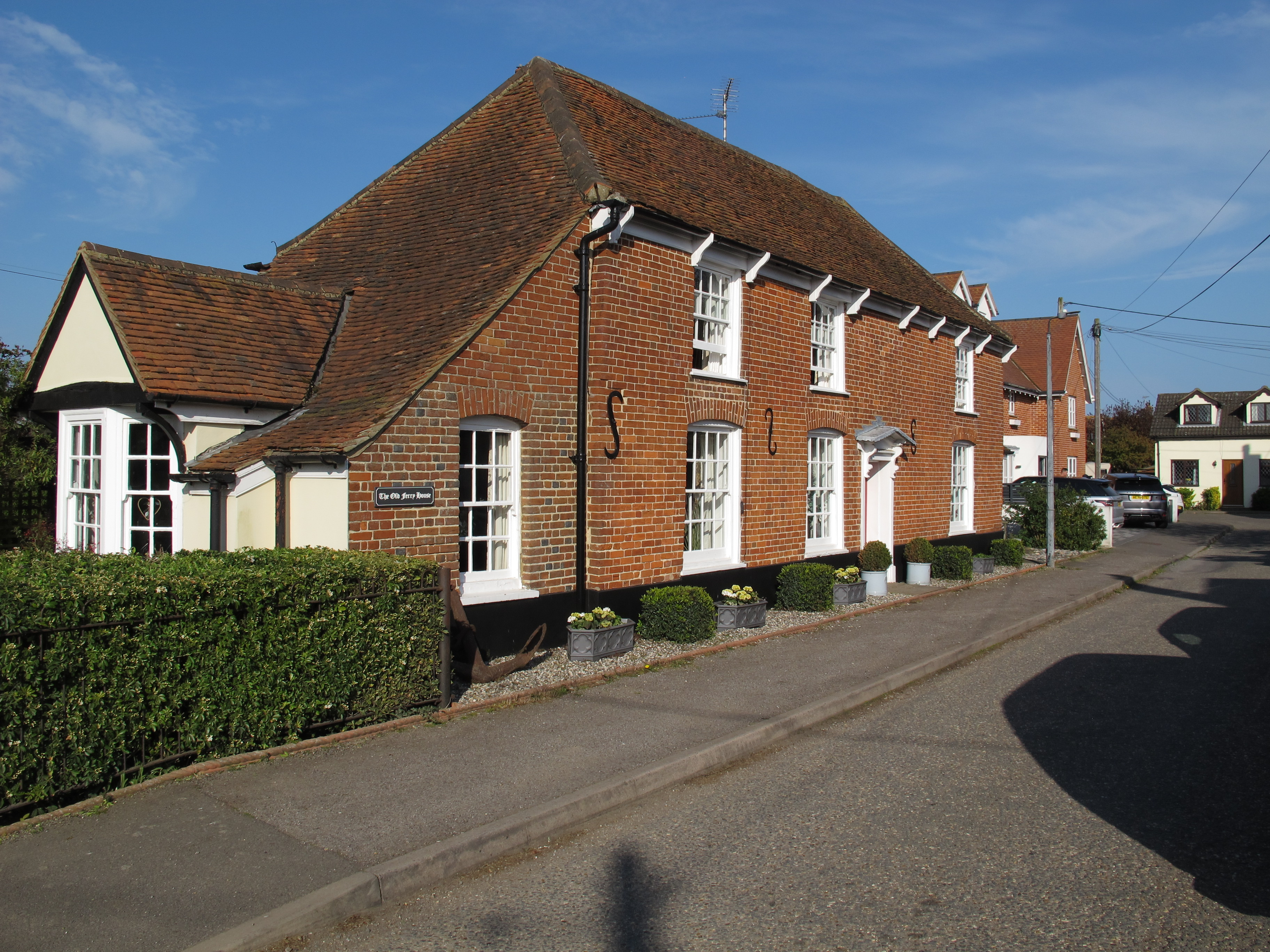
The Old Ferry House, dating back to the 18th century

The Domesday Book of 1086 records South Fambridge as Phenbruge in the Rochford Hundred of Essex. North Fambridge was separately listed as Fanbruge in the Wibrihtesherne Hundred, later renamed Dengie Hundred.

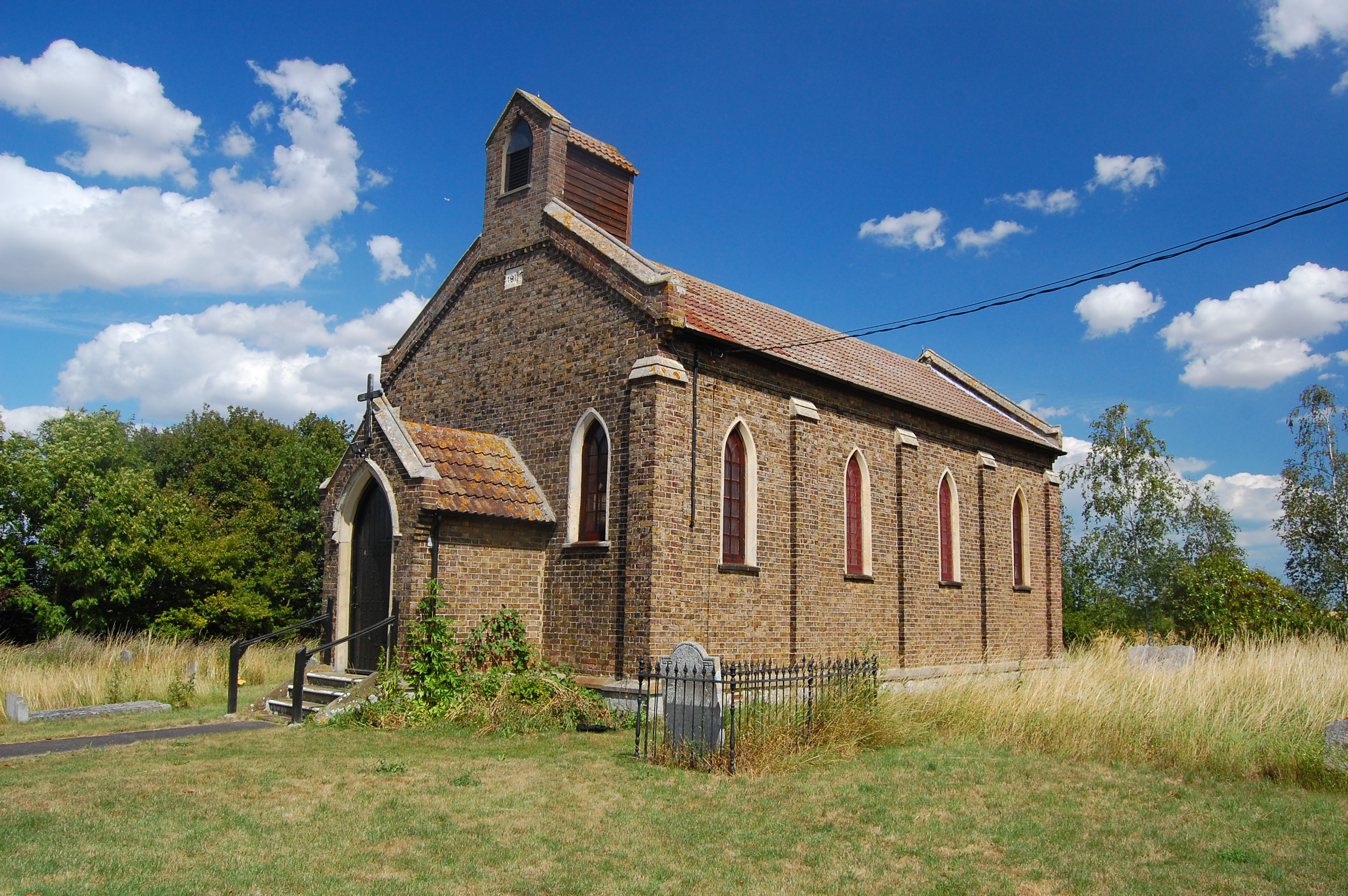
All Saints' Church

No church or priest is mentioned in the Domesday Book, but South Fambridge came to be a parish. The parish church, dedicated to All Saints, was rebuilt in 1846. It stands in an isolated location a little way to the south of the village itself, on the road towards Ashingdon. In 1894 the parish was joined with neighbouring Ashingdon for ecclesiastical purposes as a united benefice.

In February 1909, Noel Pemberton Billing opened Britain's first airfield at South Fambridge. The ground proved to be too marshy and it closed after just a few months, in November 1909. A modern housing estate on part of the airfield site is now called Pemberton Field. A memorial stone was unveiled in 2009, marking the centenary of the airfield's opening.

In 1946 the civil parish of South Fambridge was abolished and its area absorbed into Ashingdon. At the 1931 census (the last before the abolition of the civil parish), South Fambridge had a population of 282.
