= Birthe Kjølbye-Biddle =

Danish archaeologist (1941–2010)

Birthe Kjølbye-Biddle (15 July 1941 – 16 January 2010) was a Danish archaeologist specialising in early Christianity in Britain.

== Education and career ==
Birthe Kjølbye was born in Sønderborg on 15 July 1941. Her father Axel Kjølbye was a solicitor and active member of the resistance movement during the German occupation of Denmark in the Second World War, using his office opposite the Gestapo headquarters in Sønderborg to hide in plain sight. Kjølbye-Biddle studied archaeology at Aarhus University from 1960 to 1972, graduating with a Magister's degree. As a student she worked on excavations in Aarhus and Hedeby, both dating to the Viking era, and also spent a year at the University of Edinburgh, where she studied the Early Bronze Age under Stuart Piggott.

Kjølbye-Biddle was elected a Fellow of the Society of Antiquaries of London in 1976 and won its Frend Medal for "contributions to the study of archaeological and material remains of the early Christian Church" in 1986. A Festschrift edited by Martin Henig and Nigel Ramsay was presented jointly to Kjølbye-Biddle and her husband in 2010; it included a tribute from Margrethe II.

== Excavations ==
In 1964 Kjølbye-Biddle joined the excavations at Winchester Cathedral, where she gained a reputation in English field archaeology as the "dynamic pipe-smoking young Danish woman [...] imposing new standards of rigour". The complex site revealed the remains of the original minster and other early medieval churches and shrines demolished to build the extant Norman cathedral, as well as thousands of Christian burials. Kjølbye-Biddle's methods were instrumental in sequencing and dating the graves and set a new standard for the excavation of urban cemeteries, though she would later regret the speed at which some were excavated.

The director of the Winchester excavations was Martin Biddle, whom Kjølbye-Biddle married in 1966 and with whom she would work for much of her later career. After Winchester, Kjølbye-Biddle and Biddle led a series of excavations at Repton, where they again uncovered a substantial early medieval cemetery, including the mausoleums of the kings of Mercia. There they also discovered a mass grave containing the remains of at least 264 individuals, mostly men. Kjølbye-Biddle and Biddle proposed that the mass burial was that of the Great Heathen Army that invaded England in 865 and overwintered in Repton in 873, however radiocarbon dating of the remains showed that they had accumulated over many years. A reevaluation of the radiocarbon following the discovery of the marine reservoir effect in 2013, after Kjølbye-Biddle's death, proved their original Viking hypothesis correct.

Kjølbye-Biddle and Biddle also worked at St Albans Cathedral and the Church of the Holy Sepulchre in Jerusalem.

== Personal life ==
Kjølbye-Biddle was married to Martin Biddle from 1964 until her death of ovarian cancer on 16 January 2010. They had two daughters. The couple also lived briefly in the United States, where Biddle was the director of the Penn Museum from 1978 to 1981.
