= Battle of Assandun =

Battle between Danish and English armies in 1016

- Part of Cnut's invasion of England
Date	18 October 1016
Location	Unknown; various locations possible, but probably somewhere in Essex
Result	Danish victory

Belligerents
Kingdom of England	Kingdom of Denmark

Commanders and leaders
Edmund Ironside; Ulfcytel †	Cnut the Great; Thorkell the Tall; Eiríkr Hákonarson

Strength
Unknown	Unknown

Casualties and losses
Heavier	Lighter

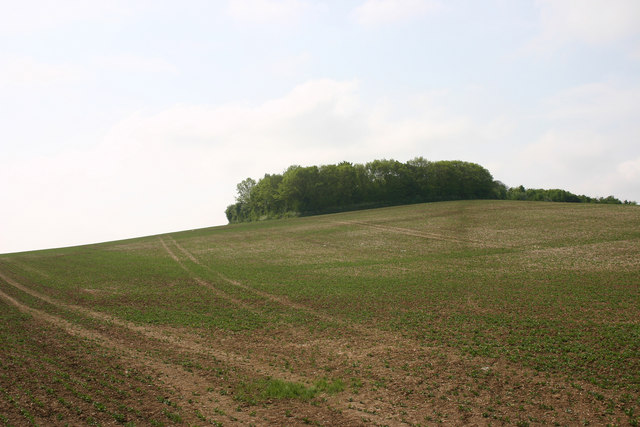
Ashingdon hill, possible location of the battle

The Battle of Assandun (or Ashingdon) was fought between Danish and English armies on 18 October 1016. There is disagreement whether Assandun may be Ashdon near Saffron Walden in north Essex, England, or, as long supposed, Ashingdon near Rochford in south-east Essex. It ended in victory for the Danes, led by King Cnut, who triumphed over an English army led by King Edmund Ironside. The battle was followed by a treaty dividing England between Cnut and Edmund, but Edmund died shortly afterwards and Cnut then became undisputed king as had been agreed.

== Prelude ==
On 23 April 1016, King Æthelred the Unready died from an illness that he had been suffering from since the previous year. Two opposing assemblies gathered to name his successor; an assembly of London citizens declared Edmund king and the larger Witan at Southampton declared Cnut as king. During the autumn of 1016, King Edmund raised an army consisting of West-Saxon troops as well as men from Southern England to defeat a Danish force led by King Cnut that had sailed across the Thames into Essex.

== Battle ==
On 18 October, as the Danes returned to their ships, the two forces finally engaged with each other at a place called Assandun, the exact location being disputed. Edmund formed his men into three lines and fought amongst the front lines to encourage his men, while Cnut, more of a strategist than a warrior, did not fight amongst his ranks. During the battle, Eadric Streona the ealdorman of Mercia left the battle allowing the Scandinavians to break through the English lines and win a decisive victory. The version in the Encomium Emmae Reginae says that Eadric urged his men to flee before the battle began, saying "Let us flee and snatch our lives from imminent death, or else we will fall forthwith, for I know the hardihood of the Danes". However, it also implies that this statement is a deception by Eadric: "And according to some, it was afterwards evident that he did this not out of fear but in guile; and what many assert is that he had promised this secretly to the Danes in return for some favour." Seeing a good chunk of his army leave the field, Edmund was undeterred. He told his warriors that they were better off without the craven men who deserted them, and he advanced into the midst of the enemy, cutting down the Danes on all sides. Eadric Streona had previously defected to Cnut when he landed in England but after Cnut's defeat at the Battle of Otford he came back to the English. However, this was a trick, as he again betrayed the English at Assandun.

During the course of the battle, Eadnoth the Younger, Bishop of Dorchester on Thames, was killed by Cnut's men whilst in the act of saying mass on behalf of Edmund Ironside's men. According to the Liber Eliensis, Eadnoth's hand was first cut off for a ring, and then his body cut to pieces. The leading thegn Ulfcytel also died in the battle.

== Aftermath ==
Following his defeat, Edmund was forced to sign a treaty with Cnut. By this treaty, all of England except Wessex would be controlled by Cnut and when one of the kings should die the other would take all of England, that king's son being the heir to the throne. After Edmund's death on 30 November, Cnut became the king of all of England. On 18 October 1032, a church at Assandun was consecrated to commemorate the battle and those who had died during it.

== Battlefield location ==
There is another possible location of the battle; Ashdon, also in Essex, or closer to nearby Hadstock. There have been many findings of Roman and Anglo-Saxon coins in the area, and the construction of the Saffron Walden to Bartlow branch line through the 'Red Field' between Hadstock and Linton in the 1860s discovered a large number of skeletal remains. Historians have argued inconclusively over the different sites for years. Ashdon's 10th-century wooden village church itself was possibly built on the site of a pre-Christian temple, that was rebuilt using stone in the early 11th century, about the right time for Cnut's conquest. Little remains of the earlier structures, which were largely obliterated by the construction of the current church of All Saints during the late 13th to early 15th centuries. A possible site for Cnut's church is St Botolph's Church in Hadstock, known to date from the early 11th century, still largely extant, and much closer to an alternative battle site.

== Legacy ==
The battle is mentioned briefly in Knýtlinga saga which quotes a verse of skaldic poetry by Óttarr svarti, one of Cnut's court poets.

King Knut fought the third battle, a major one, against the sons of Æthelred at a place called Ashington, north of the Danes' Woods. In the words of Ottar:

At Ashington, you worked well
in the shield-war, warrior-king;
brown was the flesh of bodies
served to the blood-bird:
in the slaughter, you won,
sire, with your sword
enough of a name there,
north of the Danes' Woods.
