= Martin Biddle =

British archaeologist and academic

- Born: 4 June 1937 (age 89)
- Education: Pembroke College, Cambridge (MA)
- Occupation: Professor of Medieval Archaeology
- Employer: University of Oxford
- Spouse: Birthe Kjølbye-Biddle

Martin Biddle, CBE, FBA, FSA (born 4 June 1937), is a British archaeologist and academic. He is an emeritus fellow of Hertford College, Oxford. His work was important in the development of medieval and post-medieval archaeology in Great Britain.

== Early life ==
Biddle was born on 4 June 1937. He was educated at Merchant Taylors' School, a public boys school in Hertfordshire. He went on to study at Pembroke College, Cambridge, graduating Bachelor of Arts (BA). This was later upgraded to Master of Arts (MA).

== Academic career ==
Biddle was a lecturer in medieval archaeology at the University of Exeter from 1963 to 1967. From 1977 to 1981, he was Professor of Anthropology and of History of Art at University of Pennsylvania, and director of its Penn Museum. He was a member of the Royal Commission on the Historical Monuments of England from 1984 to 1995. He was Astor Senior Research Fellow in medieval archaeology at Hertford College, Oxford between 1989 and 2002, and also Professor of Medieval Archaeology at the University of Oxford from 1997 to 2002.

Biddle and his wife Birthe Kjølbye-Biddle examined Jerusalem's Church of the Holy Sepulchre to explore the long-rumoured site of the tomb where Jesus was brought after his crucifixion. This meticulous study set out to define what is known about the tomb and the Aedicule, the little shrine that has covered the tomb since the early fourth century.

Proceeding backward from the present, they examined the site in detail, its appearances, and its destructions and rebuilding through the centuries, a survey that was constructed without restrictions, using traditional methods of architectural archaeology and the most recent techniques of photogrammetry.

=== Excavations ===
- Seacourt DMV 1958–1959 (Note: Seacourt is a deserted medieval village (DMV) near the City of Oxford.) (Note: 'INTRODUCTION' (Martin Biddle) "In 1954 the proposal for the Western By-pass was resuscitated and with it the necessity for a large scale investigation of the village ... In 1958 the Ministry of Works arranged for an eight-week excavation, later extended, which was directed by the present writer ... Finally in March 1959 and the following months Fabian Radcliffe and the writer, assisted by Mr. P. V. Addyman, were able to record and partially excavate many structures revealed in the course of earth-moving in preparation for the new road, which now cuts across the site from north to south." – PDF page 2, actual page 71.)
- Nonsuch Palace 1959–1960
- Winchester 1961–1971
- Repton
- Church of the Holy Sepulchre in Jerusalem

== Honours ==
Biddle was appointed Officer of the Order of the British Empire (OBE) in the 1997 New Year Honours 'for services to the Royal Commission on the Historical Monuments of England'. He was promoted to Commander of the Order of the British Empire (CBE) in the 2014 Birthday Honours for services to archaeology.

On 1 January 1964, Biddle was elected a Fellow of the Society of Antiquaries of London (FSA). In 1985, he was elected Fellow of the British Academy (FBA). He served as president of the London and Middlesex Archaeological Society from 2011 to 2014.

== Sackler Lecture ==
In 2012, Raymond Sackler and his wife Beverly endowed a series of lectures in honour of Norman Hammond. These lectures are co-hosted by Peterhouse, Cambridge, and the McDonald Institute for Archaeological Research. The third Sackler lecture in honour of Norman Hammond was given on 27 February 2017 at Peterhouse by Biddle on "Capital Considerations: Winchester and the Birth of Urban Archaeology".

== Select works ==
- Biddle, Martin; Hudson, Daphne M (1 April 1973). Future of London's Past. Rescue. ISBN 0-903789-01-9.
- Biddle, Martin (1989). "Introduction". Anglo-Saxon and Mediaeval Archaeology, History and Art, with special reference to Sutton Hoo: The highly important Working Library and Archive of more than 6,000 titles formed by Dr. Rupert L.S. Bruce-Mitford FBA, D.Litt., FSA. Wickmere: Merrion Book Co.
- Biddle, Martin; Avni, Gideon (7 July 2000). The Church of the Holy Sepulchre. Rizzoli. ISBN 0-8478-2282-6.
