= Olaf Tryggvason =

King of Norway from 995 to 1000

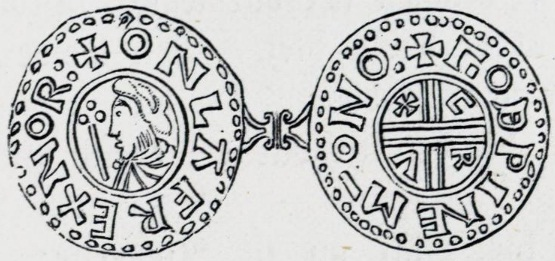
- Only known type of coin of Olaf Tryggvason, in four known specimens. Imitation of the Crux-type coin of Æthelred the Unready.

King of Norway
- Reign: 995–1000
- Predecessor: Harald Bluetooth (as king); Haakon Sigurdsson (as regent)
- Successor: Sweyn Forkbeard
- Born: 960s Norway
- Died: 9 September 1000; Svolder, Norway
- Spouses: Geira of Wendland; Gyda of Dublin; Gudrun Skeggesdatter; Tyra of Denmark
- Issue: Tryggvi the Pretender (possibly)
- Father: Tryggve Olafsson
- Mother: Astrid Eiriksdotter

Olaf Tryggvason (960s – 9 September 1000) was King of Norway from 995 to 1000. He was the son of Tryggvi Olafsson, king of Viken (Vingulmark, and Rånrike), and, according to later sagas, the great-grandson of Harald Fairhair, first King of Norway. He is numbered as Olaf I.

Olaf was important in the conversion of the Norse to Christianity, but he did so forcibly within his own kingdom. He is said to have built the first Christian church in Norway in 995, and to have founded the city of Trondheim in 997. A statue dedicated to him is located in the city's central plaza.

Historical information on Olaf is sparse. He is mentioned in some contemporary English sources, and some skaldic poems. The oldest narrative source mentioning him briefly is Adam of Bremen's Gesta Hammaburgensis ecclesiae pontificum of circa 1070.

In the 1190s, two Latin versions of "Óláfs saga Tryggvasonar" were written in Iceland, by Oddr Snorrason and Gunnlaugr Leifsson – these are now lost, but are thought to form the basis of later Norse versions. Snorri Sturluson gives an extensive account of Olaf in the Heimskringla saga of circa 1230, using Oddr Snorrason's saga as his primary source. Modern historians do not assume that these late sources are accurate, and their credibility is debated. The most detailed account is named Óláfs saga Tryggvasonar en mesta ("Greatest Saga of Óláfr Tryggvason") and is recorded in the Flateyjarbók, and in the early 15th-century Bergsbók.

== Biography ==
The account in this article is primarily based on the late sagas.

=== Birth and early life ===
There is uncertainty about both the date and the place of Olaf's birth. The earliest Norwegian written source, the Historia Norwegiæ of the late twelfth century, states that Olaf was born in the Orkney Islands after his mother fled there to escape the killers of Olaf's father. Another late 12th-century source, Ágrip af Nóregskonungasögum, states that Olaf's mother fled to Orkney with Olaf when he was three years old for the same reason. All the sagas agree that Olaf eventually came to Kievan Rus', specifically the court of Vladimir the Great.

The version in Heimskringla is the most elaborate, but also the latest, and introduces elements to the story that are not found in earlier sources. It states that Olaf was born shortly after the murder of his father in 963, while other sources suggest a date between 964 and 969. The later dates cast doubt over Olaf's claim to be of Harald Fairhair's kin, and the legitimacy of his claim to the throne. Snorri Sturluson claims in Olaf Tryggvson's saga that Olaf was born on an islet in Fjærlandsvatnet, where his mother Astrid Eiriksdottir, daughter of Eirik Bjodaskalle, was hiding from her husband's killers, led by Harald Greycloak, the son of Eirik Bloodaxe. Greycloak and his brothers had seized the throne from Haakon the Good. Astrid fled to her father's home in Oppland, then went on to Sweden where she thought she and Olaf would be safe. Greycloak sent emissaries to the king of Sweden, and asked for permission to take the boy back to Norway, where he would be raised by Greycloak's mother Gunhild. The Swedish king gave them men to help them claim the young boy, but to no avail. After a short scuffle Astrid (with her son) fled again. This time their destination was Gardarike (Kiev), where Astrid's brother Sigurd was in the service of Vladimir the Great. Olaf was three years old when they set sail on a merchant ship for Novgorod. The journey was not successful: in the Baltic Sea they were captured by Estonian vikings, and the people aboard were either killed or taken as slaves. Olaf became the possession of a man named Klerkon, together with his foster father Thorolf and his son Thorgils. Klerkon considered Thorolf too old to be useful as a slave and killed him, and then sold the two boys to a man named Klerk for a ram. Olaf was then sold to a man called Reas for a fine cloak. Six years later, Sigurd Eirikson traveled to Estonia to collect taxes for King Vladimir. He saw a boy who did not appear to be a native. He asked the boy about his family, and the boy told him he was Olaf, son of Tryggve Olafson and Astrid Eiriksdattir. Sigurd then went to Reas and bought Olaf and Thorgils out from slavery, and took the boys with him to Novgorod to live under the protection of Vladimir.

Still according to Heimskringla, one day in the Novgorod marketplace Olaf encountered Klerkon, his enslaver and the murderer of his foster father. Olaf killed Klerkon with an axe blow to the head. A mob followed the young boy as he fled to his protector Queen Allogia, with the intent of killing him for his misdeed. Only after Allogia had paid blood money for Olaf did the mob calm down. As Olaf grew older, Vladimir made him chief over his men-at-arms, but after a couple years the king became wary of Olaf and his popularity with his soldiers. Fearing he might be a threat to the safety of his reign, Vladimir stopped treating Olaf as a friend. Olaf decided that it was better for him to seek his fortune elsewhere, and set out for the Baltic.

=== Raiding ===
Heimskringla states that after leaving Novgorod, Olaf raided settlements and ports with success. In 982 he was caught in a storm and made port in Wendland, where he met Queen Geira, a daughter of King Burizleif. She ruled the part of Wendland in which Olaf had landed, and Olaf and his men were given an offer to stay for the winter. Olaf accepted and after courting the Queen, they were married. Olaf began to reclaim the baronies which while under Geira's rule had refused to pay taxes. After these successful campaigns, he began raiding again both in Skåne and Gotland.

=== Relationship and marriage to Geira ===
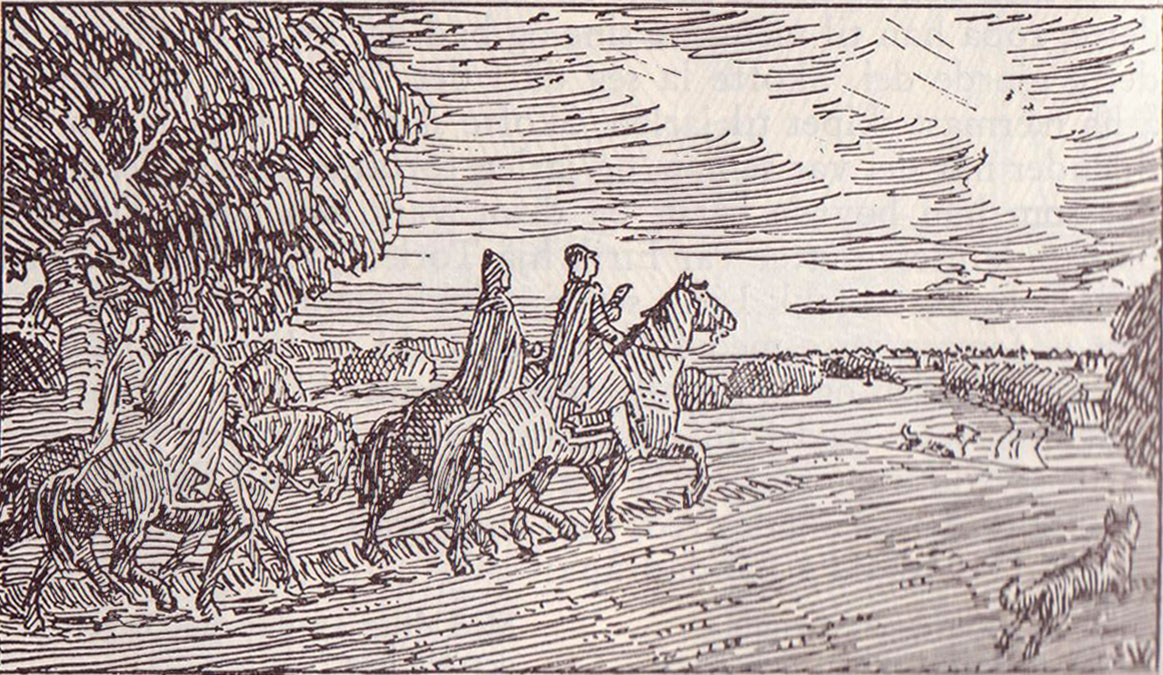
Olaf travelling to queen Geira.

Olaf Tryggvason's relationship with Geira began when Geira was warned that there were a large number of ships sitting in the harbor outside of her kingdom. Queen Geira told the man who informed her to invite them to her kingdom, telling him that she would have them over for a feast. Once Olaf and his men arrived, Queen Geira welcomed them in, held a feast for them, and engaged in very meaningful conversation with Olaf. This conversation led to Olaf and his men staying for a few days, and a relationship starting between the two leaders. Eventually these two would agree to a marriage while Olaf and his troops were still there. Later, during one of their conversations, Olaf asked Geira if there were any towns that she had lost control over. She replied, "Lord, I can name for you the towns that have escaped from our control; we have suffered their arrogance for a long time." Following this conversation, Olaf went out and recaptured these towns for Geira. Following this, and their marriage, Olaf would stay in the country until the untimely death of Geira.

=== Alliance with Emperor Otto II ===
Holy Roman Emperor Otto II assembled a great army of Saxons, Franks, Frisians, and Wends to fight the Norse pagan Danes. Olaf was part of this army because his father-in-law was king of Wendland. Otto's army met the armies of King Harald Bluetooth and Haakon Jarl, the ruler of Norway under the Danish king, at Danevirke, a great wall near Schleswig. Otto's army was unable to break the fortification, so he changed tactics and sailed around it to Jutland with a large fleet. Otto won a large battle there, and forced Harald and Haakon with their armies to convert to Christianity. The constituents of Otto's army then returned to their homelands. Harald held to his new religion, but Haakon returned to worshipping the pagan gods when he came home.

=== Death of Geira and conversion ===
After Olaf had spent three years in Wendland, his wife Geira died. He felt so much sorrow from her death that he could no longer bear to stay in Wendland, and set out to plunder in 984. He raided from Friesland to the Hebrides. After four years he landed on one of the Scilly Isles. He heard of a seer who lived there. Desiring to test the seer, he sent one of his men to pose as Olaf. But the seer was not fooled. So Olaf went to see the hermit, now convinced he was a real fortune teller. And the seer told him:

Thou wilt become a renowned king, and do celebrated deeds. Many men wilt thou bring to faith and baptism, and both to thy own and others' good; and that thou mayst have no doubt of the truth of this answer, listen to these tokens. When thou comest to thy ships many of thy people will conspire against thee, and then a battle will follow in which many of thy men will fall, and thou wilt be wounded almost to death, and carried upon a shield to thy ship; yet after seven days thou shalt be well of thy wounds, and immediately thou shalt let thyself be baptized.

After the meeting mutineers attacked Olaf, and he was wounded but survived, and as a result he converted to Christianity.

David Hugh Farmer, in the Oxford Dictionary of Saints, writes 'it is tempting' to identify the seer with Saint Lide who lived on the island of St Helen's in the Isles of Scilly.

By another account, Saint Ælfheah of Canterbury baptized him near Andover, Hampshire, England in 994. However, Henrietta Leyser, the author of Ælfheah's entry in the Oxford National Dictionary of Biography, states that Olaf was already baptized and that the 994 event at Andover was a confirmation of his faith, part of a Danegeld treaty in which he agreed to no longer raid in England.

Following the death of Geira, it states in The Saga of Olaf that he travelled to Russia. During his stay here, he had a dream in which God spoke to him. The voice he heard said, "Hear me, you who promise to be a good man, for you never worshipped gods or paid them any reverence. But rather you disgraced them, and for that reason your works will be multiplied for good and profitable ends. Still you are very deficient in those qualities that would allow you to be in these regions and make you deserving to live here in eternity, because you do not know your Creator and you do not know who the true God is."

=== Battle of Maldon ===
In 991 Olaf was one of the commanders of the first large-scale Viking attack on England in a generation. A large force harried Ipswich and inflicted a major defeat on the English at the Battle of Maldon, which was the subject of a famous Old English poem. Sweyn Forkbeard was probably also one of the Viking commanders.

=== Ascent to the throne ===
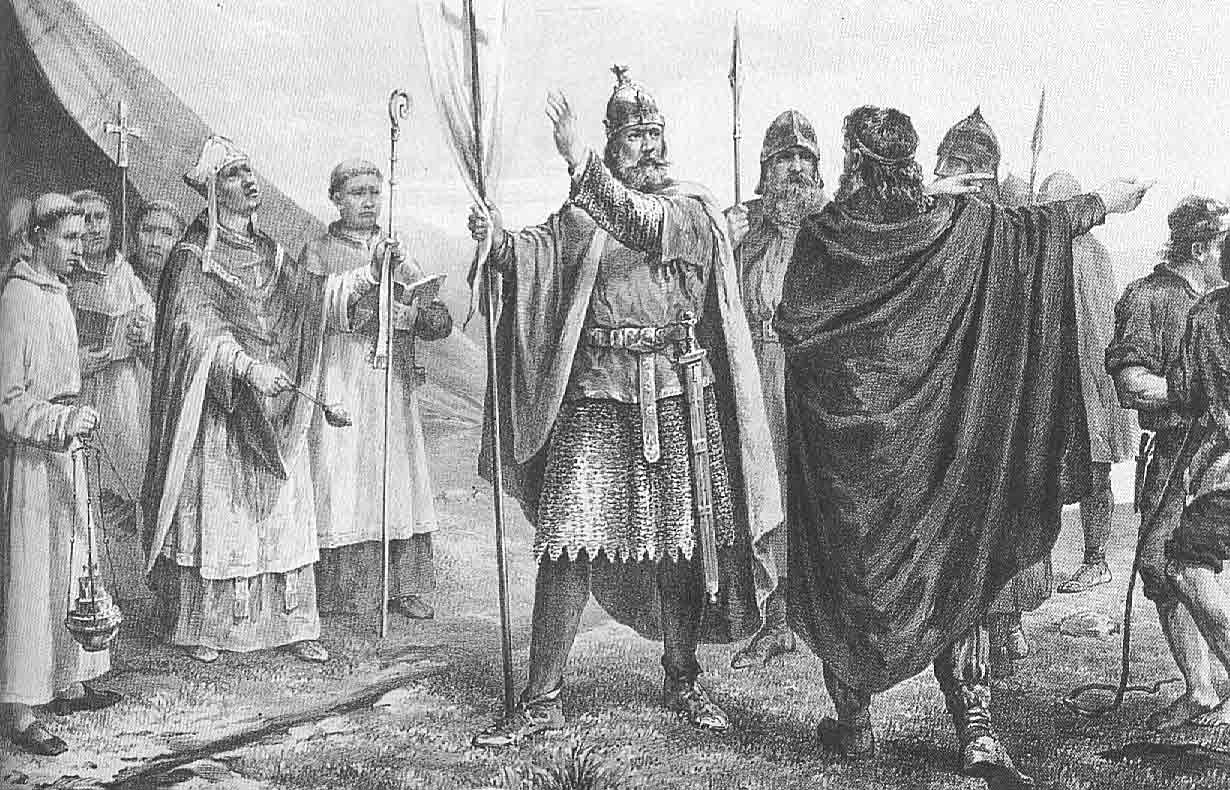
Olaf Tryggvason arrives in Norway.

In 995, rumours began to surface in Norway of a Norwegian-blooded Irish king. This caught the ear of Jarl Haakon, who sent Thorer Klakka to Ireland, posing as a merchant, to see whether the king was the son of Tryggve Olafson; Haakon told Thorer that, if the Irish king really is Olafson's son, then Thorer must lure him back to Norway, so that the jarl could have him under his power. Thorer befriended Olaf and told him of the situation in Norway, that Jarl Haakon had become unpopular among the folk due to his frequent habit of taking daughters of the elite as concubines, which was nonetheless his right as ruler, though the jarl quickly grew tired of them and sent them home after a week or two; moreover, he was weakened by his fighting with the heathen king of Denmark, which was started as a reaction to the king's rejection of the Christian faith.

Olaf seized this opportunity and sailed for Norway. When he arrived, many men had already revolted against Haakon, who was forced to hide in a hole dug in a pigsty, together with his thrall, Kark. When Olaf met the rebels, they accepted him as their king, and together they started to search for Haakon. They eventually came to the farm where Haakon and Kark were hiding, but did not find them. Olaf held a meeting just outside the hogpen and promised a great reward for the killing of Haakon. The two holed men overheard this speech, and Haakon became distrustful of Kark, fearing he would kill him for the reward, but in any case he was trapped between a rock and a hard place: surrounded by potential lifetakers and unable either to leave the pigsty or to stay awake forever. So, when he finally fell asleep, Kark knife-beheaded him. On the following day, Kark came before King Olaf and presented him the head of Haakon, for which the king then also decapitated the treacherous slave instead of rewarding him the geld, now having to himself two heads rather than only Haakon's.

After his confirmation as King of Norway, Olaf fared to those parts of Norway which had been under the dominion of, and sworn allegiance to, the Dane king, not Jarl Haakon. He then demanded that they all be baptized, and they complied most reluctantly.

=== Reign ===
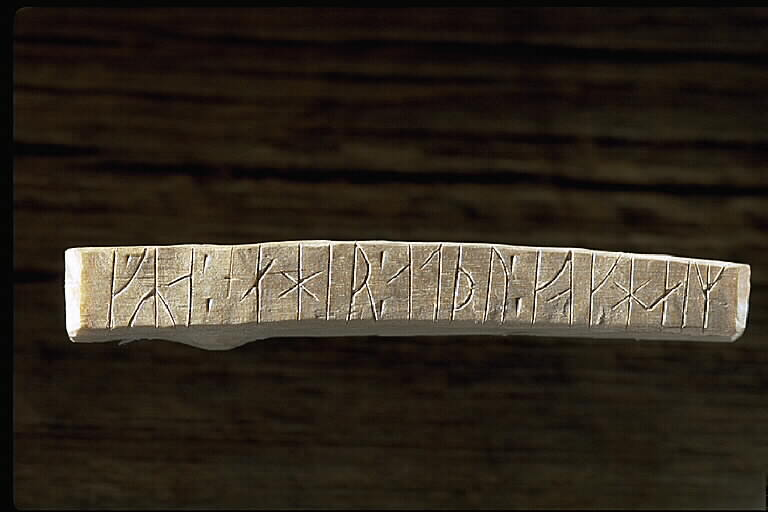
Runic inscription on wood discovered in Norway: "Gyda says that.."

In 997, Olaf founded his seat of government in Trondheim, where he had first held a thing with the revolters against Haakon. It was a suitable site because the River Nid twisted itself before going into the fjord, creating a peninsula that could be easily defended against terrestrial attacks by only one short wall.

Both his Wendish and his Irish wife had brought Olaf wealth and good fortune, but, according to the Sagas, his last wife, Tyra, was his undoing, for it was on an expedition undertaken in 1000 to wrest her lands from Burislav that he was waylaid off the island Svolder by the combined Swedish, Danish, and Wendish fleets, together with the ships of Earl Haakon's sons.

=== Attempted conversion of Norway to Christianity ===
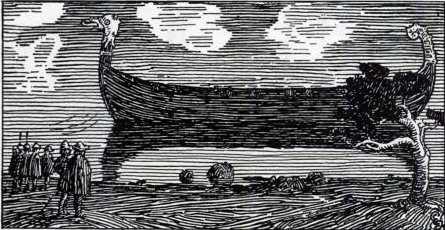
The Long Serpent, Olaf's dragonship.

It has been suggested that Olaf's ambition was to rule a united Christian Scandinavia, and it is known that he made overtures of marriage to Sigrid the Haughty, queen of Sweden, but negotiations failed because of her steadfast pagan faith. Instead, he made an enemy of her, and did not hesitate to involve himself in a quarrel with King Sweyn Forkbeard by marrying Sweyn's sister Tyra, who had fled from her heathen husband Burislav, the semi-legendary "King of Wends", in defiance of her brother's authority.

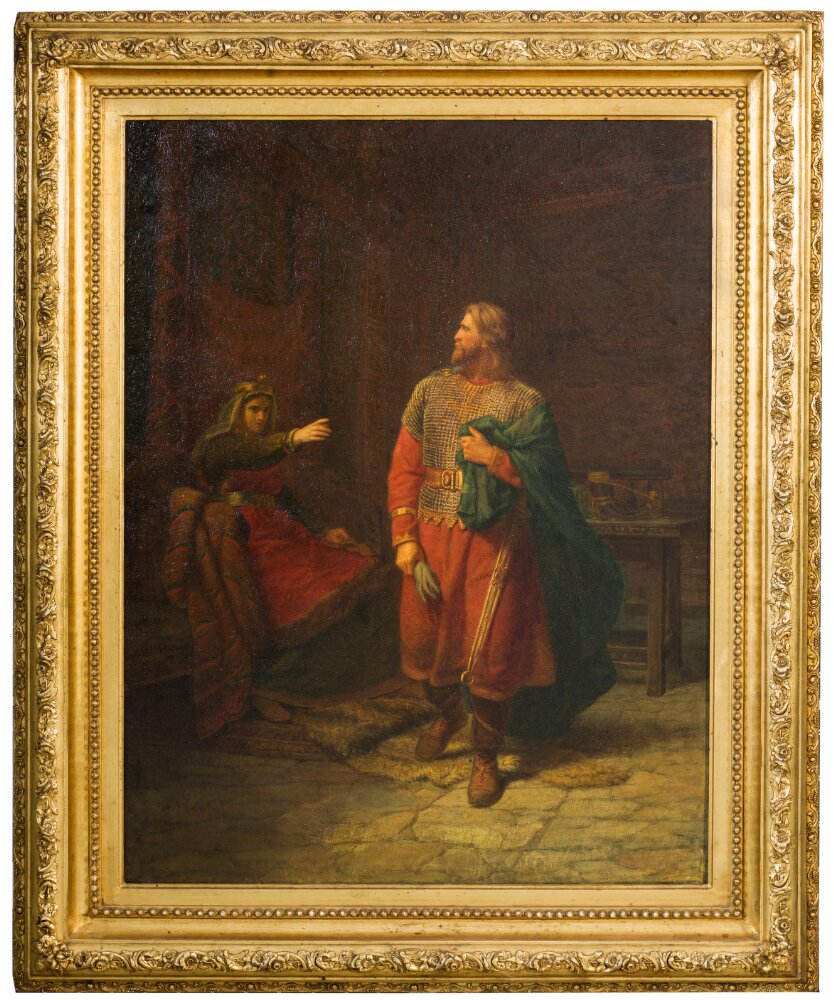
Olav Trygvason and Sigrid Storråda by Mårten Eskil Winge

Olaf continued to promote Christianity throughout his reign. He baptized the explorer Leif Ericson, who took a priest with him back to Greenland to convert the rest of his kin. Olaf also converted the people and Earl of the Orkney Islands to Christianity. At that time, the Orkney Islands were part of Norway. While Olaf sent missionaries to other lands and baptized dignitaries who visited Norway to spread Christianity, within his own kingdom he used forced conversion through means such as exile, hostage taking, mutilation, torture, and death for those who refused as well as destroying pagan temples. Noted victims include Thorlief the Wise who had one eye torn out—his torturers were supposed to blind him but his stoic bearing during the torture led them to run away after doing only half the job—and Raud the Strong who had a venomous snake forced into body through his mouth by a red hot iron. Ultimately, Olaf's efforts at widespread conversion failed.

=== Death ===
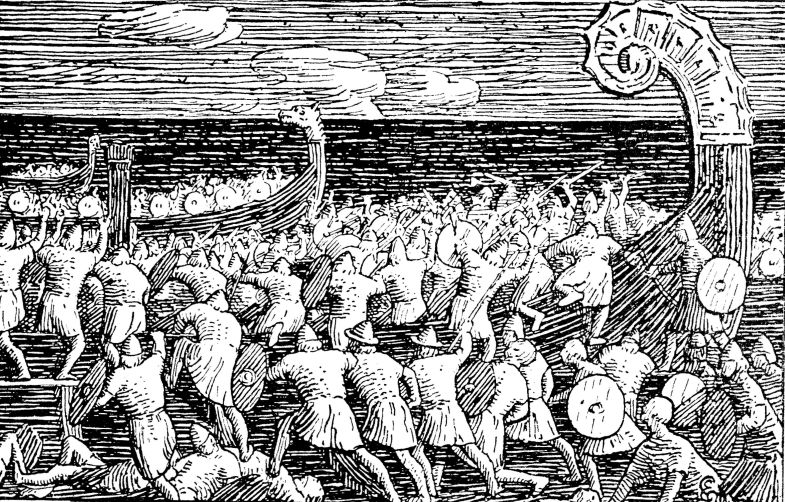
The battle of Svolder. Jarl Erik's men boarding the Long Serpent.

He died at the sea Battle of Svolder when his forces were defeated by a combined armada from Denmark, Sweden and the Jarls of Lade. Finally surrounded on his flagship the Ormrinn Langi (Long Serpent), Danish sources report that when all was lost he committed suicide by throwing himself into the sea, "the end befitting his life", according to Adam of Bremen. Saxo Grammaticus says that Olaf preferred suicide to death at the hands of the enemy and jumped overboard in full armour rather than see his foes victorious. The Norwegian and Icelandic accounts are more complex and more favourable to Olaf. Hallfreðr's memorial poem for his lord had already alluded to rumours that Olaf escaped death at Svolder. The sagas offer a variety of possibilities. Ágrip reports:

"But of the fall of King Óláfr nothing was known. It was seen that as the fighting lessened he stood, still alive, on the high-deck astern on the Long Serpent, which had thirty-two rowing places. But when Eiríkr went to the stern of the ship in search of the king, a light flashed before him as though it were lightning, and when the light disappeared, the king himself was gone."

Other sagas suggest that one way or another Olaf made his way to the shore; perhaps by swimming, perhaps with the help of angels, most likely rescued by one of the Wendish ships present. After his escape, Olaf supposedly sought salvation for his soul abroad, perhaps joining a monastery. Mesta describes a series of "sightings" of him in the Holy Land, the last in the 1040s. Hallway recounts a passage from Berg indicating Olaf may have entered a monastery and sent a gift of a knife to Einar Thamberskelfar.

== Legacy ==
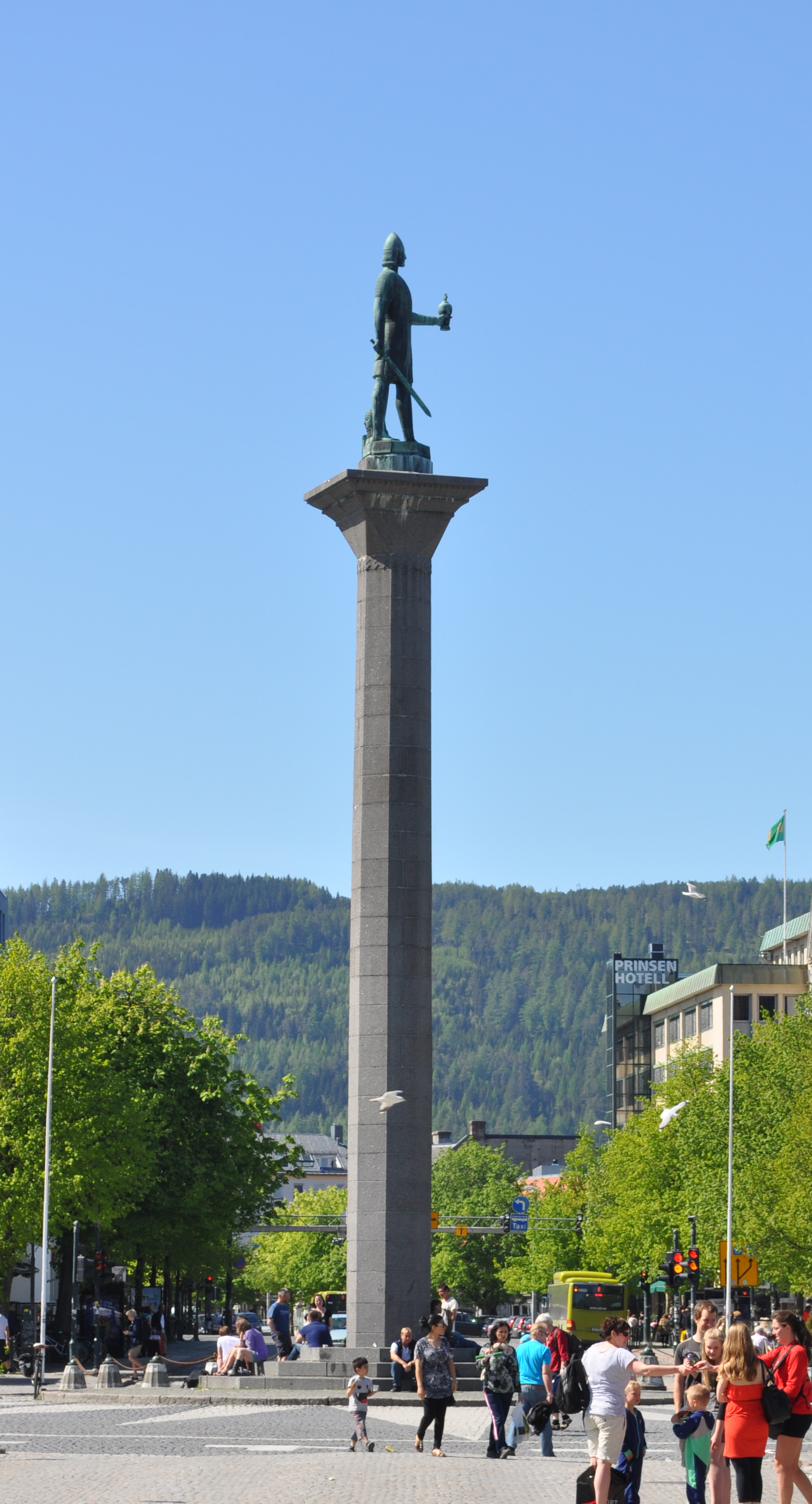
Statue of Olaf in the city plaza of Trondheim. Between the king's legs lies the head of the slave Tormod Kark, Haakon Jarl's murderer.

In the early 11th century, a Viking chieftain named Tryggvi invaded Norway, claiming to be the son of Olaf and Gyda. His invasion was defeated by forces loyal to Cnut the Great's son Svein Knutsson. An account preserved in Morkinskinna relates that Tryggvi was killed by a farmer after the battle. Many years later, when Harald Hardrada was king of Norway, he passed by the site of the battle. The king met an old friend of his who pointed out the alleged assassin. After questioning the purported killer and hearing him confess, King Harald had the man hanged, citing the familial bond between him and Tryggvi and his duty to avenge the latter's death.

For some time after the Battle of Svolder, there were rumors that Olaf had survived his leap into the sea and had made his way to safety. Accounts reported by Oddr Snorrason included sightings of Olaf in Rome, Jerusalem, and elsewhere in Europe and the Mediterranean. Both King Ethelred the Unready and Olaf's sister Astrid allegedly received gifts from Olaf long after he was presumed dead. The latest sighting reported by Oddr took place in 1046.

Olaf routinely used force to compel conversion to Christianity, including execution and torture of those who refused. Raud the Strong refused to convert and, after a failed attempt using a wooden pin to pry open his mouth to insert a snake, was killed by a snake goaded by a hot poker through a drinking horn into Raud's mouth and down his throat. Eyvind Kinnrifi likewise refused and was killed by a brazier of hot coals resting on his belly. The possibly apocryphal figure, Sigrid the Haughty was said to have refused to marry Olaf if it meant forgoing her forefathers' religion, upon which Olaf slapped her with his glove, an act that prompted her to unite his enemies against him years later.

The religion of Olaf Tryggvason has been questioned as well. Adam of Bremen states Olaf Tryggvason was a sorcerer an apostate, providing evidence from the nickname Cracabben meaning Crow's bones, that Tryggvason performed divination with birds before battles. Independent evidence outside of Adam of Bremen suggests there was syncretism between Christianity and paganism in Olaf's court, as his poet expressed ambivalent beliefs between Christianity and the Ásatrú, and Thangbrand, the priest that Tryggvason sent to convert Iceland, is famously represented breaking Canon Law that forbid priests from killing.

== See also ==
- Óláfsdrápa Tryggvasonar, poem in the Bergsbók
- An unfinished opera (begun 1873) by Edvard Grieg, Olav Trygvason (see List of compositions by Edvard Grieg)
- The 1896 choral work by Edward Elgar Scenes from The Saga of King Olaf (based on Longfellow's poem)
- The Saga of King Olaf (1863) poem by Henry Wadsworth Longfellow
- Garðaríki
- HNoMS Olav Tryggvason

Olaf Tryggvason Vigen branch Cadet branch of the Fairhair dynasty Born: 960s Died: 9 September 1000
Regnal titles
Vacant Rule of Haakon Sigurdsson Title last held by Sweyn Forkbeard	King of Norway; 995–1000	Vacant Rule of Eiríkr Hákonarson and Sveinn Hákonarson Title next held by Sweyn Forkbeard
