= Raud the Strong =

Norse pagan chieftain and seafaring warrior (900s CE) described in Saga literature

Raud the Strong was a Norse chieftain, blót practitioner and seafaring warrior, who resisted conversion to Christianity in the late 10th century AD, described in Heimskringla.

Olaf Tryggvason was King of Norway from 995 to 1000 AD. He played an important part in the conversion of the Vikings to Christianity. According to the Sagas, Olaf traveled to the parts of Norway that had been under the rule of the King of Denmark. He demanded that the citizenry be baptized, and most reluctantly agreed. Those that did not were tortured or killed. Despite King Olaf's persuasive efforts, many of the Vikings were reluctant to renounce their Gods and adopt Christianity. New and increasingly painful tortures and executions were devised by Olaf and his men. One of the most famous incidents of recalcitrance to Olaf's attempts at coerced conversion to Christianity, according to the Sagas, is that of Raud the Strong.

Raud the Strong was a large landowner, described as an eager practitioner of the Norse pagan sacrifice ritual blót, and a sea-farer. Raud was known for his beautiful longship, a boat larger than any of Olaf's, with a dragon's head carved into the bow. The ship was called “The Dragon” or “The Serpent.”

Raud the Strong, who also had the reputation of being a wizard, was defeated by Olaf in a sea battle. He escaped on his vessel, using the technique of sailing against the wind, which was a sailing technique unusual in northern European waters at that time. Raud outran Olaf and escaped to his settlement in Gylling and Haering at Godøya.

After the weather calmed, Olaf sailed under cover of darkness to Godey and seized Raud from his bed. Then the king told Raud that if he accepted Christian baptism, he could keep his lands and ship and the king would be his friend.

But Raud refused, saying he would never believe in Christ, and mocked Olaf's religion and deity. Olaf became incensed and said Raud should die a horrible death. The king ordered him to be bound to a beam of wood, with his face pointed upward, and a round pin of wood put between his teeth to force his mouth open. The king then ordered a snake to be put into Raud's mouth, but the snake would not go in. Olaf then ordered either the hollow stalk of an angelica or his drinking horn to be put into Raud's mouth, and forced the serpent to go in by holding a red-hot iron at the opening of the horn. As a result, the snake crept into Raud's mouth and down his throat, and gnawed its way out his side and Raud died.

Olaf seized Raud's gold and silver, weapons and many valuable artifacts. All the men who were with Raud were baptized, or, if they refused, were killed or tortured. The king also took the dragonship that Raud had owned, and steered it himself since it was much larger than any ship that he had. Using that as a model, he is said to have built his bigger famed ship Ormrinn langi, which he was using at the Battle of Svolder where he was defeated and by many sources presumed to have died.

According to legend, this is how the famous Viking ships got their distinctive shape.

Henry Wadsworth Longfellow dealt with the story of King Olaf and Raud the Strong in his Tales of a Wayside Inn (1863), Part First, The Musician's Tale; The Saga of King Olaf X. Raud the Strong.

== See also ==
- Norse paganism
