= Scenes from the Saga of King Olaf =

Cantata by Edward Elgar

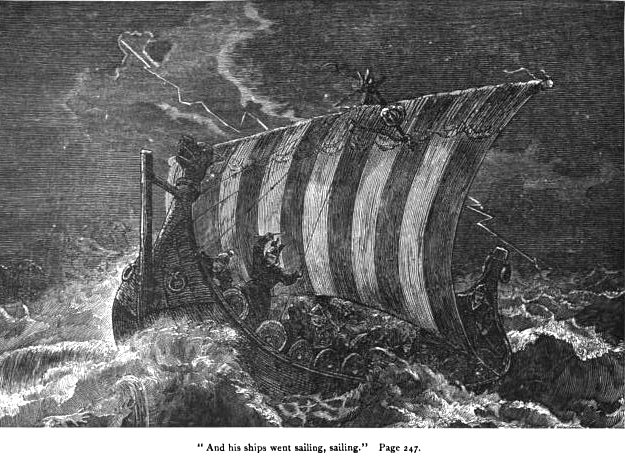
An illustration of Longfellow's poem

King Olaf (full title: Scenes from the Saga of King Olaf) is a cantata by the British composer Edward Elgar, scored for soloists, chorus and orchestra. It was commissioned for the North Staffordshire Music Festival of 1896, where it was well received. It went on to be performed by choral societies in other parts of the country.

Before the success of the Enigma Variations in 1899 consolidated his national reputation, Elgar was chiefly known for choral works such as The Black Knight and King Olaf. These early choral works have since been largely eclipsed, but King Olaf has been revived in recent years.

== Words ==
The text is an adaptation of Longfellow's The Saga of King Olaf, a poem about the historical figure Olaf Tryggvason, who brought Christianity to Norway. Longfellow's source had been the medieval Heimskringla. Longfellow's text was adapted for Elgar by one of his neighbours, H. A. Acworth. Elgar appears to have found Acworth a satisfactory collaborator, as he went on to provide Elgar with another libretto, Caractacus (1898).

== Music ==
The cantata has a prologue, nine scenes and an epilogue. Of particular note are the forceful first scene (The Challenge of Thor) and the lively fifth (The Wraith of Odin). In the seventh scene (Thyri) there is duet between Thyri and Olaf, 'The Grey Land Breaks to Lively Green', through which they express their love. The chorus, 'A Little Bird in the Air', has been called highly original, "unlike anything else Elgar composed before or since". In the epilogue, the final unaccompanied chorus As Torrents in Summer has achieved separate popularity as a partsong.

As in the case of some other works by Elgar, reviews have noted the influence on King Olaf of Wagner's music, for example, in the use of Leitmotifs; the Guardian's music critic Andrew Clements refers to "echoes of Wagner" in the score.

== Performance history ==
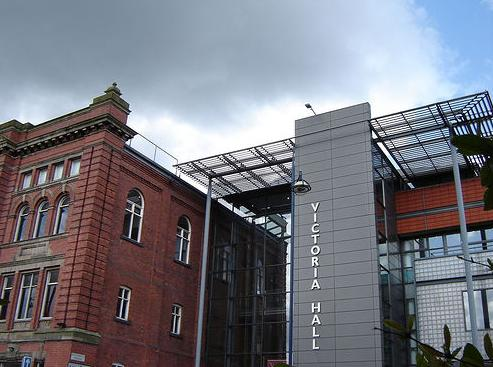
The Victoria Hall in 2008 (original hall and modern extension)

King Olaf was first performed in 1896 at the Victoria Hall in Hanley, Staffordshire, with the composer conducting. The soloists included Edward Lloyd, a famous tenor of the time who was chosen to give first performances of lead roles in Caractacus and The Dream of Gerontius.

The cantata was revived at the Victoria Hall to mark the centenary of its premiere with Donald Hunt conducting the BBC Philharmonic, the Ceramic City Choir and the three soloists Susan Chilcott, Arthur Davies and Alan Opie. Another place with connections to the work is Bergen in Norway. Longfellow knew the violinist Ole Bull who came from Bergen, and their friendship appears to have been a factor in the poet choosing King Olaf as a subject. The Bergen Philharmonic Orchestra performed the cantata in 2014, under the baton of Andrew Davis, Davis conducted the work again at the Three Choirs Festival: despite there being a tradition of performing Elgar at this festival, this was a premiere.

== Publication ==
The score was published by Novello & Co, a firm which had already published The Black Knight and which became Elgar's regular publishers. However, their edition of 1896 has been described as a "relatively cramped" by the Elgar Society which published a full score in 2007.

== Recordings ==
The work was recorded for the first time in the 1980s by EMI with the London Philharmonic Orchestra conducted by Vernon Handley, a specialist in British music. In 2014 the Bergen Philharmonic and three Norwegian choirs recorded the work at the Grieg Hall for Chandos (a 2 CD set including a shorter work, The Banner of Saint George) under the baton of Sir Andrew Davis.
