= Caractacus (Elgar) =

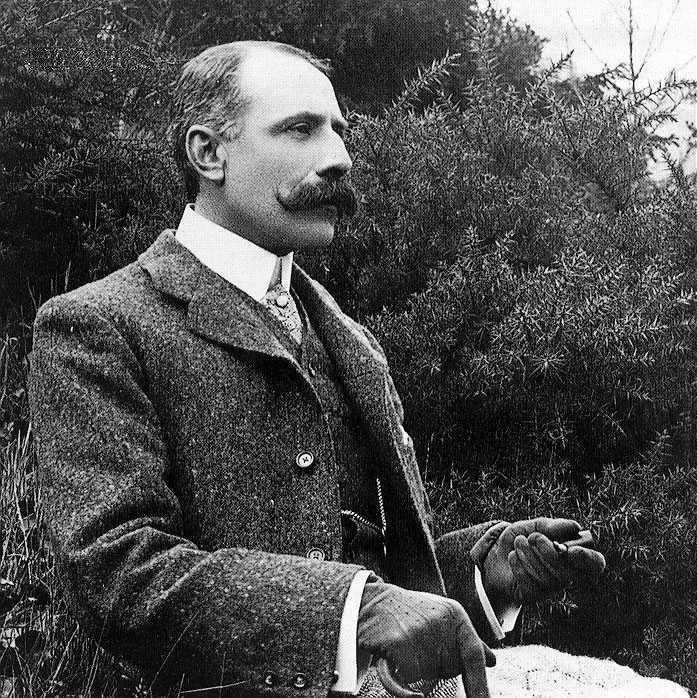
Edward Elgar, c. 1900

Caractacus, Op. 35, is a cantata in six scenes by the English composer Edward Elgar, premiered in 1898. It depicts the struggle of Caractacus, chieftain of the Ancient British Catuvellauni tribe, against the invading Roman army.

The cantata was well received and was a major step in the composer's rise to national fame, culminating in the Enigma Variations the following year.

== Background ==
Elgar was approaching forty before making much impact on the British musical scene. He later said that he could have written Caractacus ten years earlier if he had not been obliged to devote himself to earning a living by teaching and helping behind the counter in his father's music-shop in Worcester. In December 1897 he was invited to compose a work for the Leeds Triennial Musical Festival. He suggested an orchestral piece but the festival organisers wanted a choral work.

Elgar's choice of the ancient Briton chief Caractacus as his subject was prompted by his mother, who suggested that he write some "tale" about the Herefordshire Beacon in the Malvern Hills, where, according to legend, Caractacus had made his last stand against the Romans and been defeated. For the libretto of the work, Elgar turned to Harry Arbuthnot Acworth, a retired civil servant and sometime poet. He had worked with the composer to adapt Longfellow's poem The Saga of King Olaf in 1896. The resulting cantata had been well received at the North Staffordshire Music Festival and had later been performed in London.

Acworth provided some love interest by supplying Caractacus with a daughter, Eigen, and a prospective son-in-law, Orbin, a member of a "half-priestly order of minstrels". By the middle of 1898 the cantata was complete. Queen Victoria consented to be the dedicatee of the work. In July rehearsals began. The chief conductor of the festival was Sir Arthur Sullivan, who took an interest in the new work and made helpful suggestions to Elgar.

== Premieres ==
=== Leeds ===
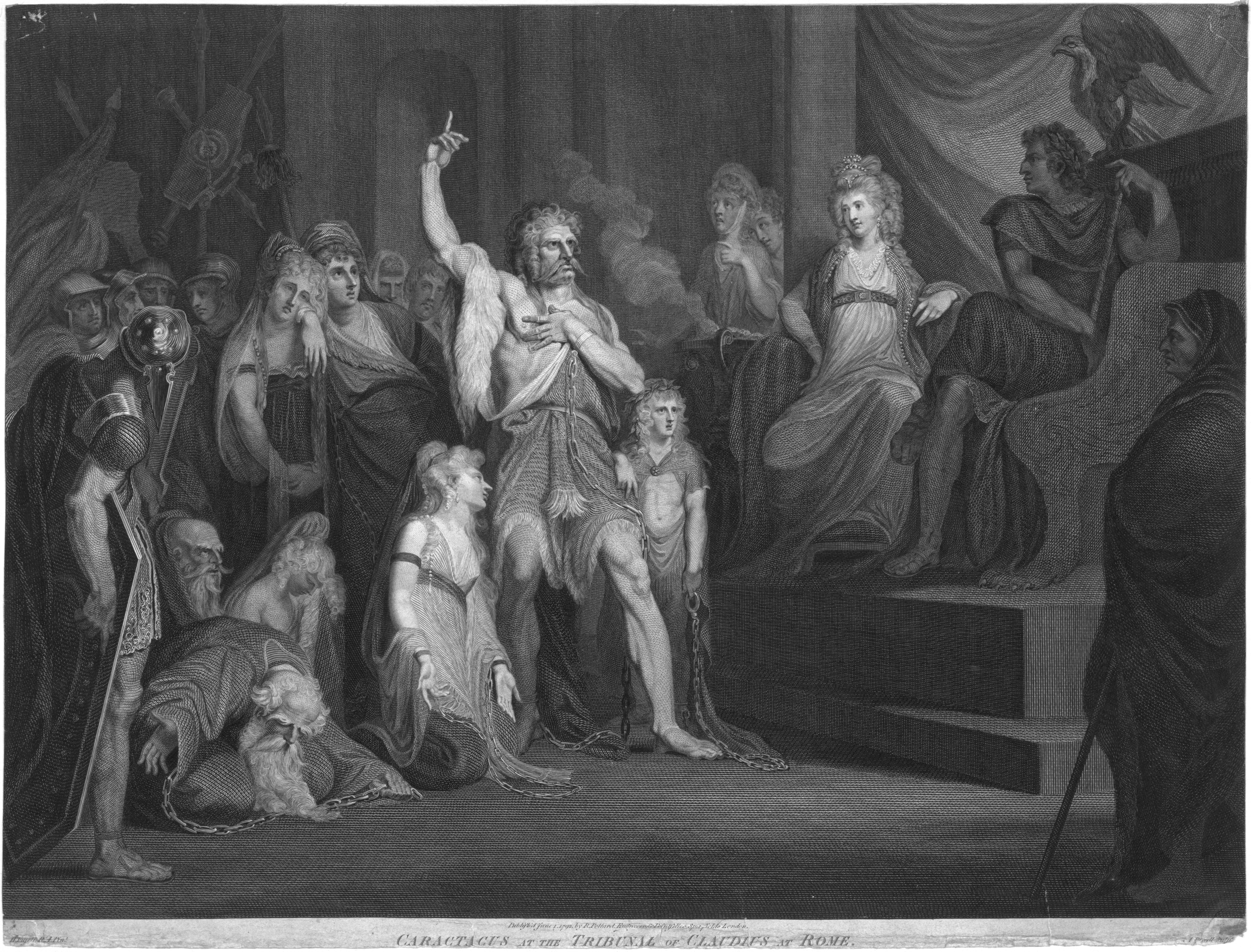
Caractacus at the Tribunal of Claudius at Rome (1792) by Andrew Birrell

The cantata was first performed in Leeds Town Hall on 5 October 1898. The composer conducted the festival orchestra and chorus and the soloists Medora Henson (soprano, Eigen), Edward Lloyd (tenor, Orbin), Andrew Black (baritone, Caractacus) and John Browning (bass in three roles: Arch-Druid, Bard, and Emperor Claudius). The Musical Times described the work as "as a composition of remarkable imaginative power and mastery of technical resource, particularly in the suggestive interweaving of Leitmotiven and in telling orchestration".

=== London ===
The Royal Choral Society performed the cantata at the Royal Albert Hall on 20 April 1899. Elgar conducted, and the soloists were the same as at Leeds except for the bass, Douglas Powell replacing Browning. The Musical Times called the performance "an emphatic success":

it says much for the inspiration and breadth of Mr Elgar's music that number after number aroused enthusiastic applause. As at Leeds, the most appreciated portions were the vivid and weird scene in the forest, the impassioned duet of the lovers, the beautiful and pathetic "lament" of the King, the dramatic processional march, and the fine peroration, which sends the listener away with a haunting strain and a pulse stirred by patriotic words.

=== As opera ===
In January 1928, with Elgar's permission, the Liverpool Repertory Opera Company staged the cantata as an opera. The experiment was seen as only partially successful. The critic A. K. Holland wrote, "there is all too little real conflict in Caractacus. It is, in fact, nothing more than a series of tableaux, and in no single scene is there any development of a dramatic situation. This is unfortunate, for the music itself has plenty of movement, more indeed than the text, and generally the atmosphere of the music is sufficiently operatic to make it congenial to the stage".

== Scenes and musical numbers ==
Scene I, British Camp on the Malvern Hills – Night

- Chorus: Watchmen Alert!
- Caractacus, Sentries: Watchmen Alert! The King is Here
- Eigen: Father! Sire and King
- Eigen: At Eve to the Greenwood
- Orbin: On the Ocean and the River
- Spirits of the Hill: Rest Weary Monarch

Scene II, The Sacred Oak Grove by the Tomb of the Kings

- Arch-Druid, Druids & Druid Maidens: Tread the Mystic Circle Round
- Chorus & Arch-Druid: Invocation Lord of Dread And Lord of Powr
- Arch-Druid, Orbin, Druids & Druid Maidens: Bard What Read Ye?
- Caractacus, Soldiers, Orbin, Arch-Druid: Leap Leap to Light
- Druids & Druid Maidens: Hence Ere the Druid's Wrath is Woke

Scene III, The Forest Near the Severn – Morning

- Introduction: the Woodland Interlude
- Youths & Maidens: Come! Beneath Our Woodland Bow'rs
- Eigen, Orbin: Oer-Arch'd by Leaves
- Orbin: Last Night Beneath the Sacred Oak
- Chorus, Orbin, Eigen: Come! Beneath Our Woodland Bow'rs

Scene IV, The Malvern Hills

- Chorus of Maidens: Wild Rumours Shake Our Calm Retreat
- Eigen, Chorus of Maidens: When the Glow of the Evening
- Soldiers: We Were Gather'd by the River
- Caractacus, Chorus: Lament O My Warriors

Scene V, The Severn

- Bard, Druid, Maidens, Captive Britons: See them!

Scene VI, Rome

- Processional Music
- Chorus: the March Triumphal Thunders
- Claudius: Unbind His Hands
- Caractacus, Eigen, Orbin: Heap Torment Upon Torment
- Chorus of Roman Citizens: Slay, Slay the Briton!
- Caractacus, Orbin, Eigen, Roman Citizens, Claudius: I Plead Not for Myself
- Eigen, Orbin, Caractacus: Grace From the Roman!
- Chorus: the Clang of Arms is Over

== Synopsis ==
With the Britons of southern, eastern, and central England subjugated by the Romans, Caractacus, with his remaining troops, has been driven back to the Welsh border and has established a large camp on the Malvern Hills, at the summit now known as the British Camp or Herefordshire Beacon. Wandering in the forest at the foot of the hills, Caractacus's daughter, Eigen, and her fiancé, Orbin, encounter a druidess who urges them to warn the king against advancing into open country against the Romans. They deliver this warning to Caractacus. The following night, omens are interpreted at a solemn assembly of druids. They are read by Orbin, a member of the druidical order of minstrels, and he deems them unfavourable. The arch-druid misleads the king about their meaning, and Caractacus decides to march against the Romans. Orbin tries to protest, but he is cursed and driven out by the druids.

The next morning, Orbin meets Eigen in a clearing, where young men and women are gathering flowers for a sacrifice. He bids her farewell, telling her of the druids' deception of the king and his own expulsion. He adds that he too is fleeing the druids and intends to join the British forces. In the following scene, Eigen and her attendants witness the return of Caractacus and the remnants of his army to the camp in the Malvern Hills, after their defeat by the Romans. Caractacus and his family, including Orbin, are soon handed over to the enemy.

The final scene shows Caractacus, Orbin, and Eigen before the tribunal of Claudius, Emperor of Rome. Claudius is initially prepared to condemn them to death, but, impressed by Caractacus's bravery, he pardons them and grants them an honourable residence in Rome.

Acworth wrote this note for the premiere:

The general lines of history – or, failing history, of tradition – have been followed. The British Camp on the Malvern Hills is locally attributed to Caractacus. It is doubtless a British work, and is of such an extent as infers occupation by very large numbers. The scene of Caractacus’s last disastrous battle is much disputed; but it was almost certainly on the line of the Severn (Habren), and may probably have been at Caer Caradoc, in Shropshire. The unusual circumstance of mistletoe growing on the oak may be still observed in the woods below the Herefordshire Beacon. Caractacus’s appearance before Claudius in Rome, his bold defence, and the pardon of himself and his daughter are historical. Orbin is an imaginary character.

== Publication and recordings ==
Novello and Co published the orchestral score in 1898. Elgar extracted from the cantata one number, "The Sword Song", as a part-song for mixed voices, published separately.

The cantata has to date (2026) been recorded twice:

	Chandos, 1993	Hyperion, 2019
Conductor	Richard Hickox	Martyn Brabbins
Chorus	London Symphony Chorus	Huddersfield Choral Society
Orchestra	London Symphony Orchestra	Orchestra of Opera North
Eigen	Judith Howarth	Elizabeth Llewellyn
Orbin	Arthur Davies	Elgan Llŷr Thomas
Caractacus	David Wilson-Johnson	Roland Wood
Arch-Druid, Bard	Stephen Roberts	Christopher Purves
Claudius	Alastair Miles	Alastair Miles

== Sources ==
- Kennedy, Michael (1987). Portrait of Elgar (Third ed.). Oxford: Clarendon Press. ISBN 0-19-284017-7.
- Moore, Jerrold Northrop (1999). Edward Elgar: A Creative Life (Second ed.). Oxford University Press. ISBN 0-19-284014-2.
