= Lide =

Lide can refer to:

- A historical name in the southwest of England for the month of March
- -lide, a chemistry suffix indicating an sp-hybridized carbanion ionically linked to a metal
- Saint Lide, a legendary bishop

== People ==
- Alice Alison Lide
- Lide Meriwether
