= Barrow Bookstore =

American bookshop

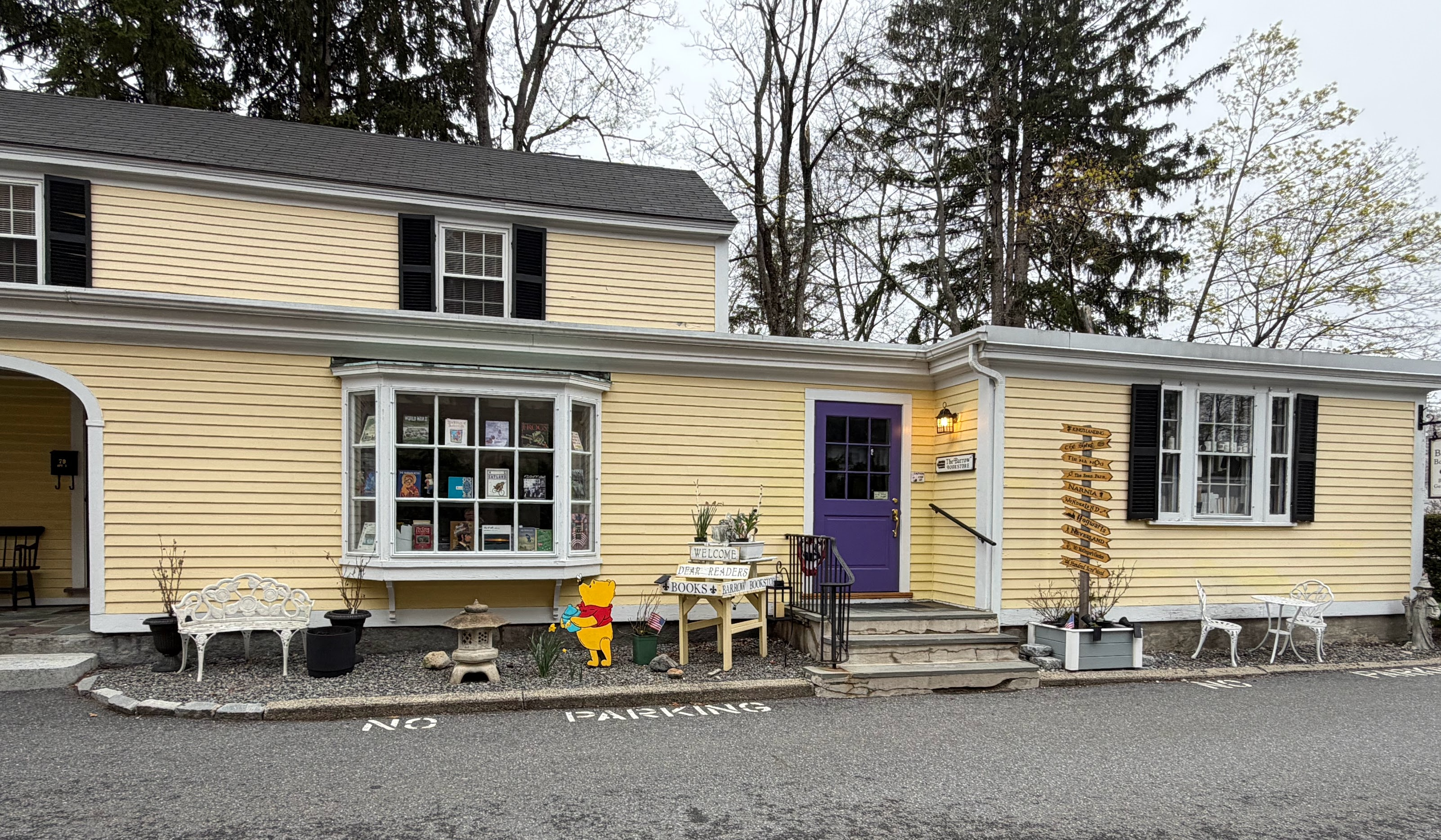
- Pictured in 2026
- Type: Private
- Industry: Retail; Bookshop
- Founded: Concord, Massachusetts, U.S. July 12, 1971 (55 years ago)
- Founder: Claiborne Watkins; Betty Woodward
- Number of locations: 1
- Products: Books
- Owner: Aladdine Joroff
- Website: www.barrowbookstore.com

Barrow Bookstore is a used-book retailer operating in Concord, Massachusetts, United States.

== History ==
Established in 1971, and located through an alley off the town's Main Street, the business was begun by the selling of books from a wheelbarrow, which is now located at the entrance to today's business. The bookstore specializes in literature regarding the history of Concord, which includes works by Ralph Waldo Emerson, Louisa May Alcott and Henry David Thoreau. A glass bookcase in the store displays a first-edition of Henry Wadsworth Longfellow's 1863 publication, Tales of a Wayside Inn.

The business was established on July 12, 1971, by Claiborne Watkins and Betty Woodward in its original location, an old train depot building on nearby Thoreau Street. They moved the shop to its current location, and later sold the business to Pamela Fenn in 1987. Fenn owned the business for 26 years, before selling it to the current owner, Aladdine Joroff, in 2013.

In 2025, USA Today shortlisted the store as one of the ten best independent bookstores in the United States. It placed fourth in 2025, and the following year, the newspaper placed it second.
