= Olav Tryggvason (statue) =

Coordinates: 63°25′50″N 10°23′42″E

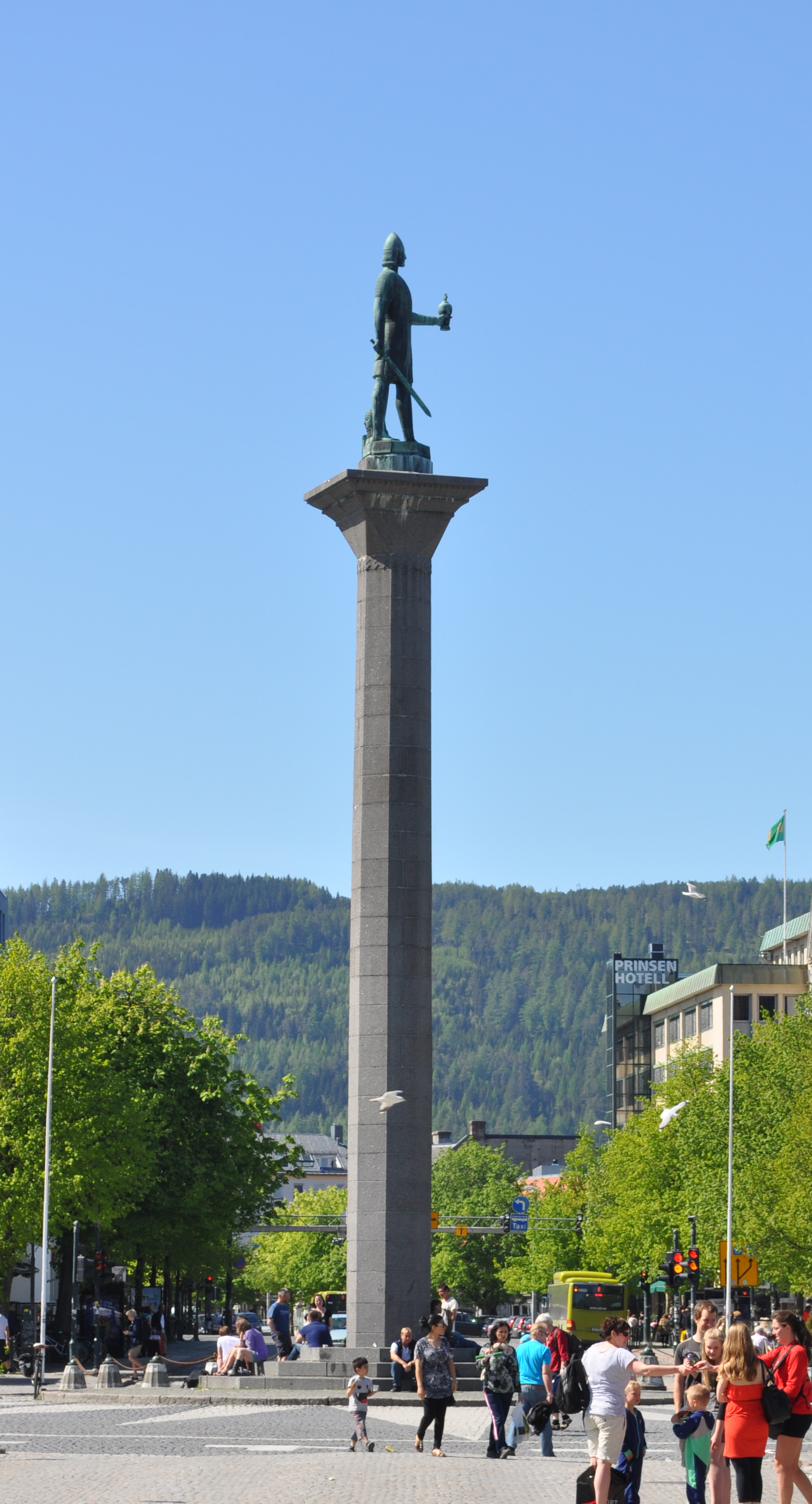
The statue of Olav Tryggvason

A statue of Olav Tryggvason is located in Trondheim, Norway. Sculpted by sculptor Wilhelm Rasmussen, it honors King Olav Tryggvason, who was the city's founder.

The 18-metre (58-foot) high statue is mounted on top of an obelisk. It stands at the center of the city square (Torvet i Trondheim) at the intersection of the two main streets, Munkegata and Kongens gate. The statue was unveiled in 1921. Around the statue base is a cobblestone mosaic, dating from 1930, which forms a gigantic sun dial . The sun dial is calibrated to UTC+1, meaning that the reading is inaccurate by one hour in the summer.

== Gallery ==
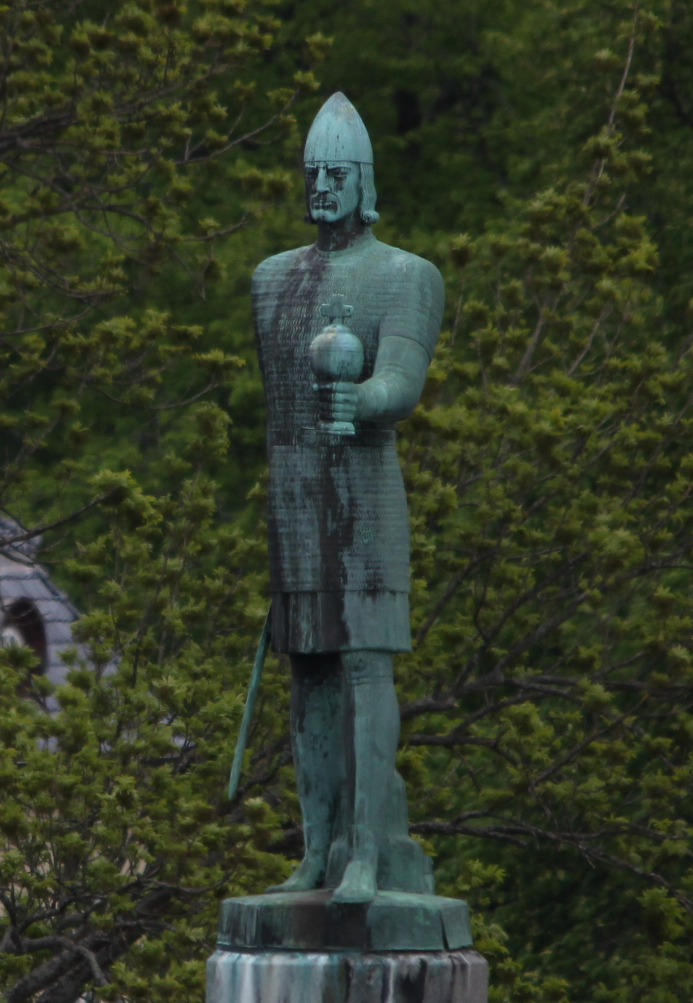
Closeup of the statue of Olav Tryggvason
