= Geira =

Wendish princess, daughter of Burislav

Geira's death illustrated in Ethel Harriet Hearn and Gustav Storm's 1911 translation of the Saga of Olaf Tryggvason

Geira (ca. 965 – 985) was a Wendish princess attested by Old Norse sagas who allegedly ruled over territory near the border of Germania before marrying a young Óláfr Tryggvasonr.

== Family ==
According to Oddr Snorrason's Óláfs saga Tryggvasonar and Snorri Sturluson's Heimskringla, she was the daughter of the Wendish king Burislav and the sister of Gunnhild, who married Sveinn Forkbeard, and Ástríðr, who married jarl Sigvaldi Strut-Haraldsson. This account of her family presents several problems of chronology.

== Óláfr Tryggvasonr ==
Both sagas present Geira as sole ruler of her own territory, with a lieutenant named Dixin, at the time of Óláfr Tryggvasonr's arrival in Wendland, which would have been in the 980s. Oddr specifies that she was already widowed by that time.

Óláfr overwintered in Wendland, becoming close to Geira and marrying her that winter. Oddr Snorrason has an extended wooing scene with Dixin as go-between which, being more romantic than most saga material, may have been inspired by romantic or classical material.

Óláfr stayed in Wendland for three years, making sure Geira's rebellious subjects continued paying tribute to her, until she died of an illness. Grieving greatly over her death, Óláfr left Wendland.
