= Tales of a Wayside Inn =

Book by Henry Wadsworth Longfellow

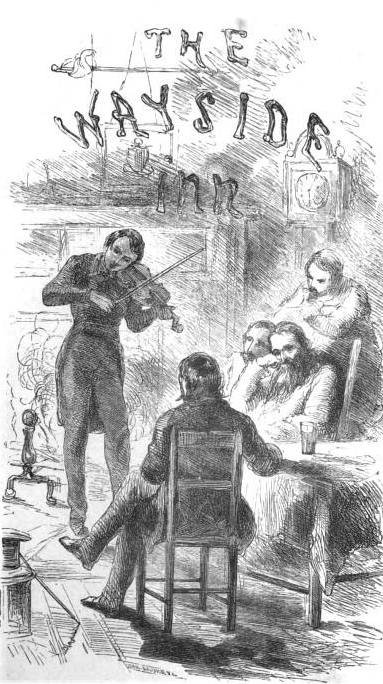
Title page illustration for an 1864 edition of Tales of a Wayside Inn

Tales of a Wayside Inn is a collection of poems by American poet Henry Wadsworth Longfellow. The book, published in 1863, depicts a group of people at the historic Wayside Inn in Sudbury, Massachusetts, as each tells a story in the form of a poem. The characters telling the stories at the inn are based on real people. The compilation, which Longfellow originally wanted to title "The Sudbury Tales", proved to be popular and he issued two additional series in the 1870s.

== Overview ==
The poems in the collection are told by a group of adults in the tavern of the Wayside Inn in Sudbury, Massachusetts, 20 miles from the poet's home in Cambridge, and a favorite resort for parties from Harvard College. The narrators are friends of the author who, though they were not named, were so plainly characterized as to be easily recognizable. Among those of wider fame are Ole Bull, the violinist, and Thomas William Parsons, the poet and translator of Dante. Each of the three parts has a prelude and a finale, and there are interludes which link together the tales and introduce the narrators. The prelude for the first part begins:

"One Autumn night, in Sudbury town,
Across the meadows bare and brown,
The windows of the wayside inn
Gleamed red with fire-light..."

== Composition and publication history ==
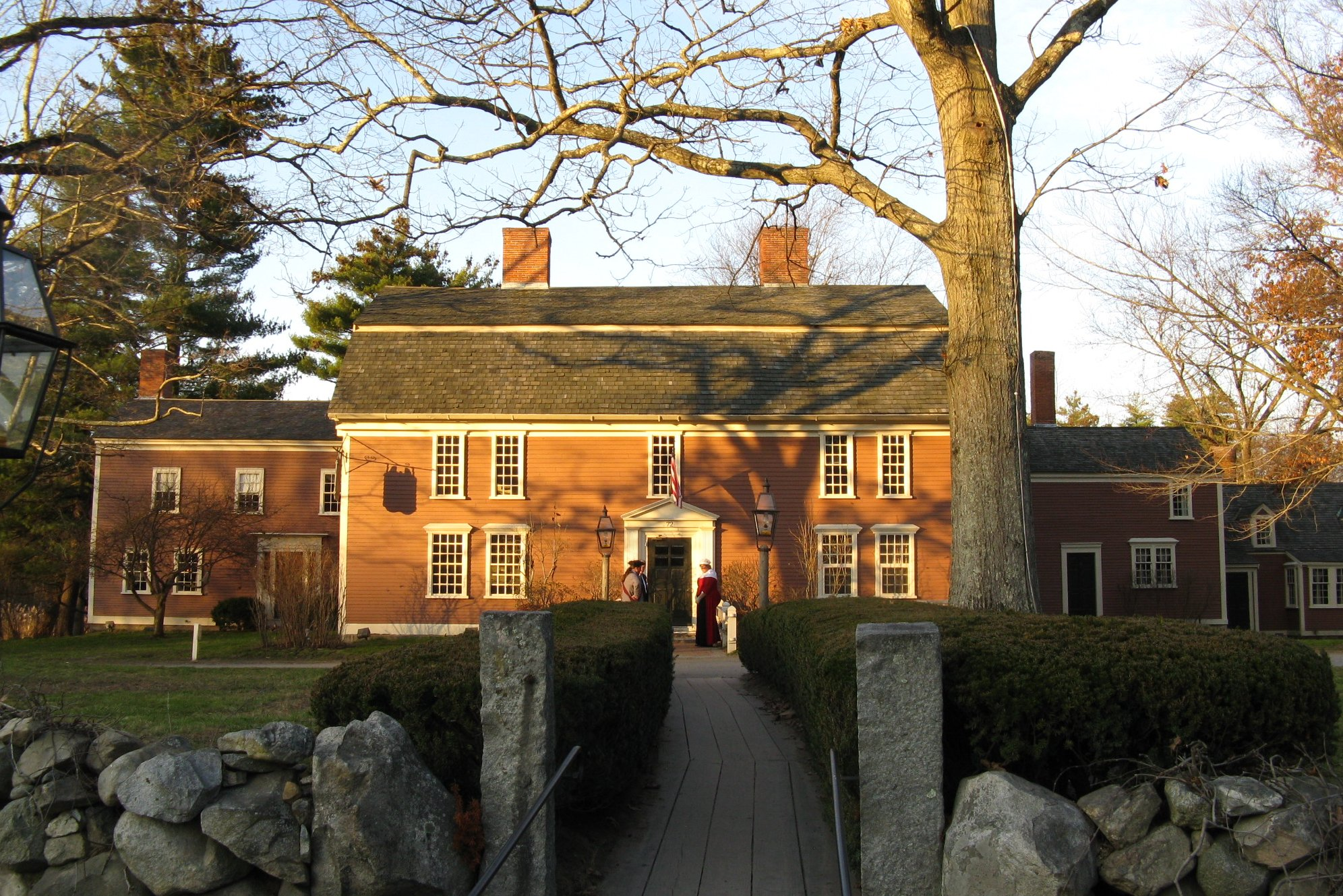
Longfellow's Wayside Inn in Sudbury, Massachusetts

Longfellow undertook the large-scale project in part to combat grief over the death of his wife Fanny in 1861. While writing it, he also dealt with his personal struggles during the American Civil War, including his oldest son's illnesses and injuries while serving in the Army of the Potomac. As he wrote to a friend in England, "I have been through a great deal of trouble and anxiety... However, I have managed to get a volume of poems through the press". Longfellow originally intended to call the collection The Sudbury Tales, but was worried it sounded too similar to Geoffrey Chaucer's The Canterbury Tales. As early as October 11, 1862, however, he considered the alternative title Tales of a Wayside Inn. He wrote in his journal that day: "Write a little on the Wayside Inn. A beginning only."

In 1862, Longfellow visited the historic Wayside Inn with his friend and publisher James T. Fields. At the time, the inn was called the Red Horse Tavern and had closed after the owner, Lyman Howe, died in 1861. It would not reopen as an inn until 1897. Longfellow referred to it as "a rambling, tumble-down building". He toured the inn with Abigail Eaton, a relative of the Howe family, who told Longfellow the history of the building and her family. Henry Ford bought the inn in 1923, restored it, and donated it to a charitable foundation. It remains as an operating inn to this day.

Most of the stories were derived by Longfellow from his wide reading — many of them from the legends of continental Europe, a few from American sources. The best known inclusion is the previously published poem "Paul Revere's Ride". It also includes "The Saga of King Olaf", a poem which Longfellow started writing as early as 1856, making it the oldest in the collection. While assembling the collection, he originally intended to use a poem called "Galgano", a translation he had made in 1853 from a work by Italian poet Niccolò di Giovanni Fiorentino, as the student's tale; it was replaced with "The Falcon of Ser Federigo", translated from The Decameron. Fields was heavily involved with the preparation of the book, particularly in the selection of individual titles for the poems, as well as for the title of the book itself, and suggestions for rhyming words. When the book was announced for publication, it was the poet's friend Charles Sumner who finally persuaded him to change the title from The Sudbury Tales to Tales of a Wayside Inn.

The collection was first published on November 23, 1863, with an initial print run of 15,000 copies. Its publication coincided with Thanksgiving Day. The New York Times called the book "a pleasant fiction" and an "excellent account". A second series was published in 1870, and a third published in 1872–1873. Though they sold well, the latter two volumes were less popular than the first.

== Analysis ==
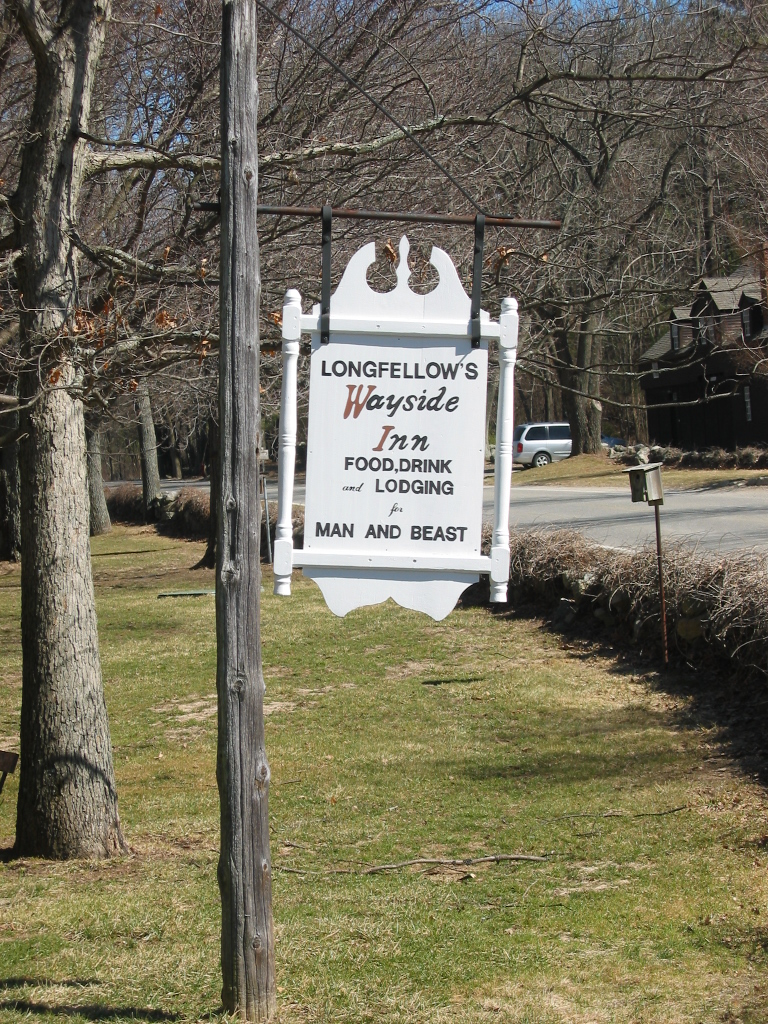
Sign for Longfellow's Wayside Inn, where the collection takes place

Many of the characters in Tales of a Wayside Inn were inspired by real people: Luigi Maria Monti (the Sicilian), Daniel Treadwell (the theologian), Thomas William Parsons (the poet), Henry Wales (the student), Isaac Edrehi (the Spanish Jew), Ole Bull (the musician), and Lyman Howe (the landlord).

Modern scholar Robert Gale praises the book for showing Longfellow's wide interests and knowledge of other cultures and its use of a wide variety of poetic formulas and styles such as blank verse, ballads, dactylic hexameter, octosyllabic lines, ottava rima, and iambic pentameter, including heroic couplets. He says the book "remains the best combination of narrative poems ever written by an American".

== Adaptations ==
In 1920, the Humane Society of Boston filmed a movie version of the "Bell of Atri" in Dedham, Massachusetts. The film was used as part of the Massachusetts Society for the Prevention of Cruelty to Animals' "Be Kind to Our Dumb Animals" campaign. The film was lost in a fire at the MSPCA in 2008.
