= Thomas William Parsons =

American dentist and poet

Photograph of Parsons from unknown date

Thomas William Parsons (August 18, 1819, Boston – September 3, 1892, Scituate, Massachusetts) was an American dentist and poet.

Parsons was educated at the Boston Latin School, and visited Italy to study Italian literature in 1836-7. His translation of Dante's Divine Comedy, which eventually comprised all the Inferno, two-thirds of the Purgatorio and fragments of the Paradiso, began to appear in 1843. After practicing dentistry in Boston, he lived for several years in England before returning to Boston in 1872. He was a contributor to The Galaxy and The Atlantic Monthly. In 1857 he married Anna (or Hannah) M. Allen (1821-1881).

== Works ==
- The First Ten Cantos of the Inferno of Dante, 1843
- Poems, 1854
- (ed. C. E. Norton), The Divine Comedy of Dante Aligheri, 1893
