= Saint Lide =

Cornish bishop and saint

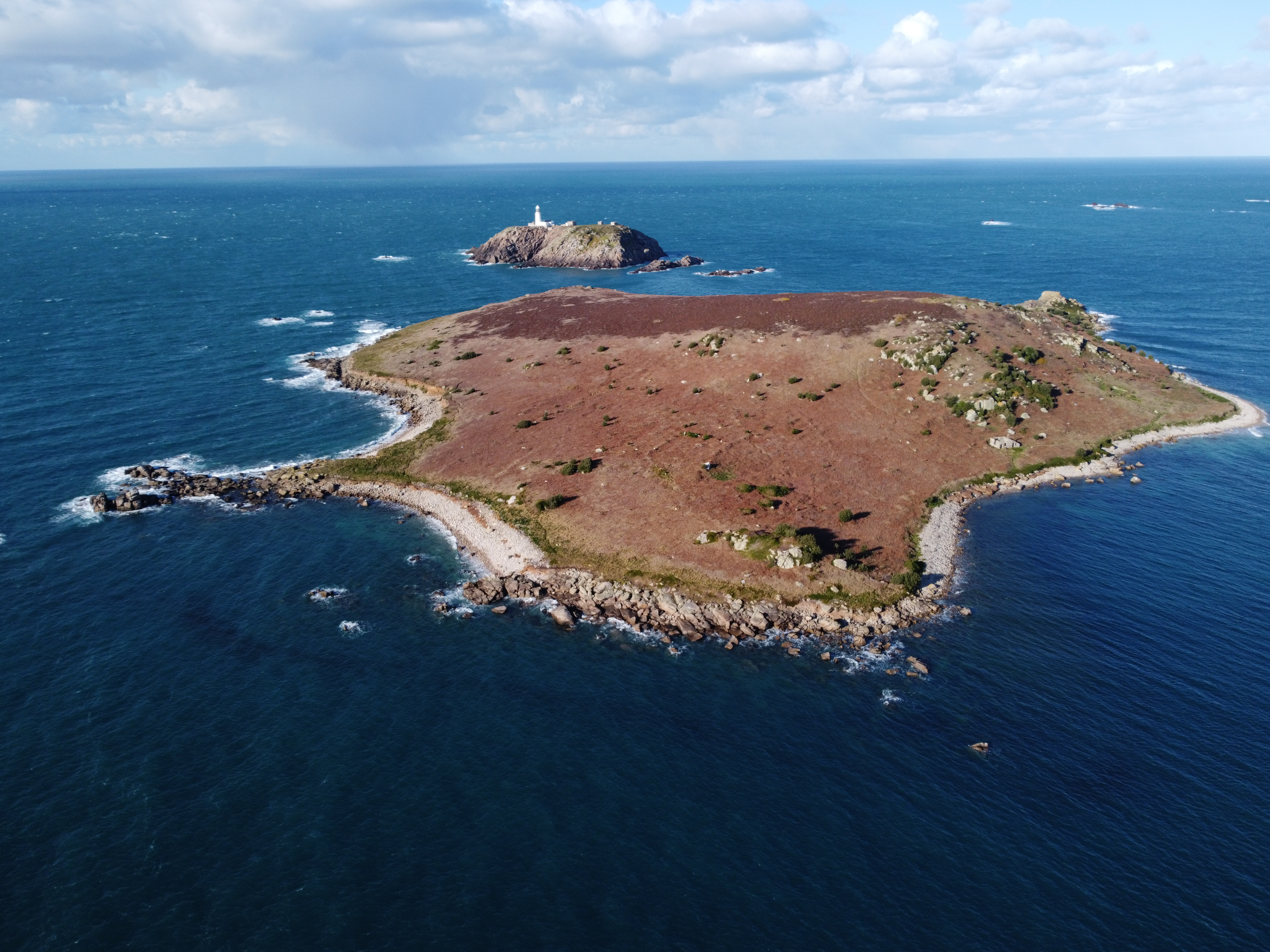
Island of St Helen's, Scilly

Lide, also known as Elide or Elidius, is a saint associated with the early medieval Christian settlement at St Helen's, Isles of Scilly.

David Hugh Farmer, in the Oxford Dictionary of Saints, writes 'it is tempting' to identify Saint Lide as the seer who was instrumental in the conversion of Olaf Tryggvason (960s – 9 September 1000), king of Norway from 995 to 1000.

The ecclesiastical foundation on St Helen's was first attested in writing in the 12th century as "the island of St Elidius" when it was granted to Tavistock Abbey. The site was a pilgrimage destination throughout the medieval period, and Pope Pius II granted an indulgence to visitors of "the chapel of St Elidius". William Worcester in 1478 described him as a bishop and son of a king, and wrote that his feast was celebrated at Tavistock Abbey on 8 August.

In mainland Cornwall, the parish church of St Issey was recorded in 1287 as dedicated to "Issey and Lid", and a chapel dedicated to "St Eledius" was recorded in St Mellion in 1448. The chapels of Helen and Loye near Land's End may also be related to Lide. Several saints known in Wales, including Saint Eliud, have similar names but are not known to have any connection to Lide.

From the 16th century, Lide's identity became confused. In 1540 John Leland mentioned him as female, and wrote "yn tymes past at her sepulchre was gret superstition." In 1564 the island was first recorded as "St Helene" which eventually replaced the association with Lide entirely.
