= Burislav =

Wendish king from Scandinavian sagas

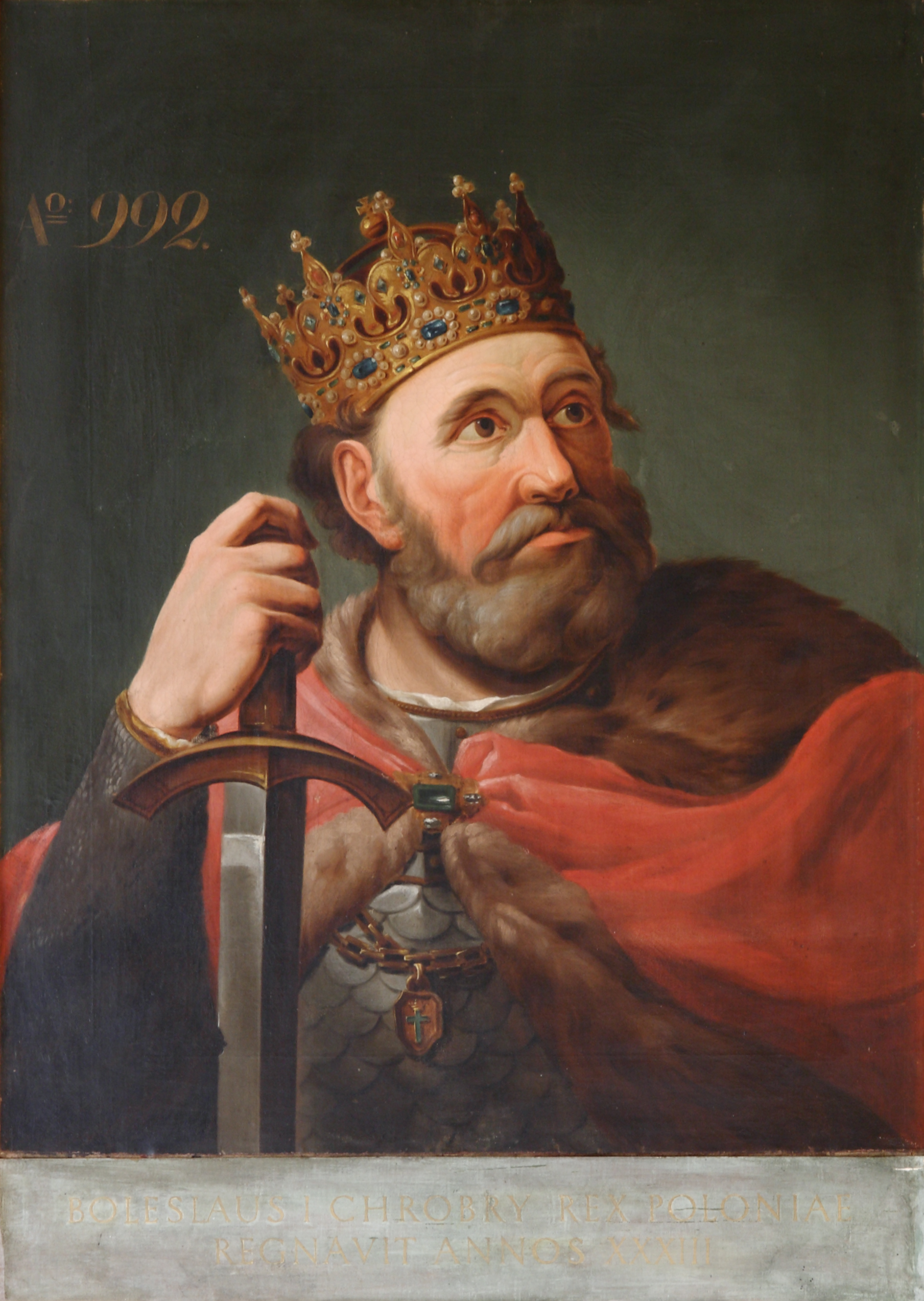
A Portrait of King Boleslaus I of Poland

Burislav, Burisleif, Burysław (died 1008) is the name of a Wendish king from Scandinavian sagas who is said to rule over Wendland. He is said to be the father of Gunhild, Astrid and Geira, who married Sweyn Forkbeard, Geriraz Olaf Trygwason, and Estridaza, Earl Sigwald of Jómsborg, respectively.

There are three possible hypotheses over his identity: first, that there actually was a Slavic prince of that name; second, that this was the name given by saga authors to any Slavic prince; third, that he is a compound person, combining two Polish rulers: Mieszko I of Poland and Bolesław I of Poland, who died on 17 June 1025.
