= St Helen's, Isles of Scilly =

Island in the Isles of Scilly, United Kingdom

St Helen's
Enys Elyd
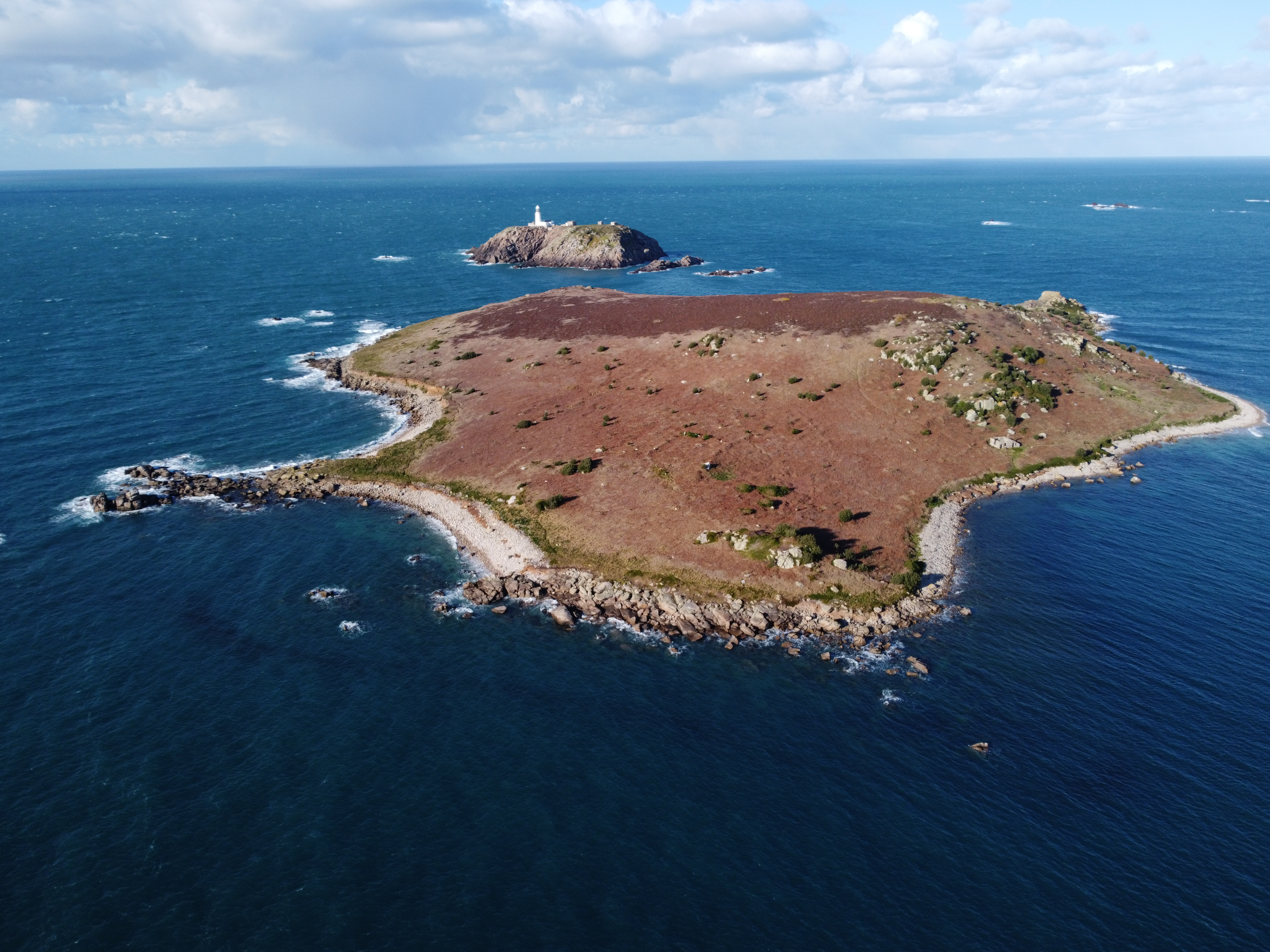
- St Helen's

- Location within Isles of Scilly

Geography
- Coordinates: 49.973°N 6.325°W
- OS grid reference: SV900170
- Archipelago: Isles of Scilly
- Area: 0.073 sq mi (0.19 km^{2})

Administration
- United Kingdom
- Civil parish: Tresco

Demographics
- Population: 0

St Helen's (Cornish: Enys Elyd) is one of the fifty or so uninhabited islands in the archipelago of the Isles of Scilly and has an approximate area of 0.1885 square kilometres (46.6 acres). On the south side of the island is one of the earliest Christian sites in Scilly, an early medieval religious complex, which is thought to be the remains of St Elidius Hermitage, an 8th-century chapel lived in by Saint Lide, (also known as Elid or Elidius). There are also the remains of an isolation hospital used to quarantine sailors with plague. The island is the major part of a Site of Special Scientific Interest and some features have been given the designation of scheduled ancient monument. Access to the island is through chartered or private boat, although there are some season trips throughout the summer. St Helen's is currently managed by the Isles of Scilly Wildlife Trust.

== Geography ==
St Helen's is the third largest of the uninhabited islands and is situated in the northern part, between Tresco and St Martin's. It has an area of 18.85 hectares (47 acres) and rises to 42 m (138 ft). Some of the nearby islands are considered to be part of the St Helen's group, these are; Foreman's Island, Men-a-vaur, Northwethel, Round Island and Teän. The island mostly consists of a hill of coarse-grained, highly jointed Hercynian granite. The landing site for the island is on a sandy beach on the south side where there are the remains of a granite quay and low sand dunes at the top of the beach. The ruined pest house is situated on a flat area behind the dunes and further inland the religious complex is based at the foot of the hill. To the east of the complex is a well and the walls of several fields.

== Pre-history ==
=== Cairns ===
The platform cairns on St Helen's make up a large amount of the total 387 surviving cairns on the Isles of Scilly, and so have been registered as an ancient monument. The remaining Bronze Age cairn field on the island consists of four ring cairns on the slight north-west facing slope. The first cairn is 4 m in diameter with a ring of earth with protruding spaced stones, 1m wide and 0.2 m high. The second cairn is oval 4 m by 3 m with a ring 0.4 m wide and 0.2 m high, incorporate two contiguous slabs embedded on edge. The third cairn is 6 m in diameter with a ring with spaced stones averaging 1m wide and 0.3 m high. The fourth cairn is 4 m in diameter with a ring of spaced stones which averages 0.7 m wide and 0.2 m high.

== History ==
=== Early Christian chapel ===
On the south slope of St Helen's there is an early medieval religious complex that is thought to be the remains of St Elidius Hermitage, an 8th-century chapel lived in by Saint Lide (also known as Elid or Elidius) which is also Saint Lide alleged burial place. Archaeological excavations suggest that the site developed from a solitary hermit site, with a single round hut and oratory, to a communal hermitage with a number of rectangular huts for individual accommodation, surrounding the church and oratory buildings. Five graves from the early hermitage were also excavated east of the living section. A field system was also present providing food for the Hermitage/Chapel, and later the Pest House residents. In the early 11th-century a small church was built on the north east side of the living section and around 1120 AD the church was granted to Tavistock Abbey. This increased the numbers of pilgrims visiting the site due to it being the shrine of Elidius, and many alterations and remodeling were made to the complex. Additionally, further excavations of the site have uncovered decorated ridge-tiles and parts of the 12th century Purbeck Marble shrine that is thought to have once housed Saint Elidius relics. It is also said that there was once a causeway from abbey church at Tresco across the downs to the church on St Helen's Isle. Currently there are yearly open air service on 8 August to celebrate the feast of St Elidius at the small ruined church.

=== St Helen's Pool ===
St Helen's Pool is a stretch of water just off St Helen's island which provided sheltered anchorage for shipping, though there is a chance ships may experience swells near high water. There is evidence to show that during the later medieval period the monks of Tresco may have collected tolls from ships for anchorage in St Helen's Pool, as it is considered that it was the main harbour of the islands in medieval times.

=== The Pest House ===
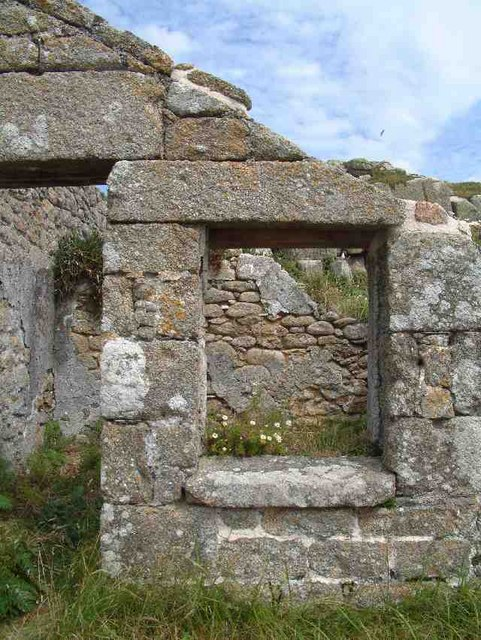
The Ruined Pest House, St Helen's

St Helen's Isolation hospital, also known as the Pest House, was a quarantine station built in 1764 to house plague cases from visiting ships calling at Old Grimsby and St Helen's Pool. It was constructed after an Act of Parliament in 1754 decreed that any plague-ridden ship north of Cape Finisterre heading for England should anchor off this island. The station included the building of an isolation hospital as well as a slipway and an extensive quay to serve it. The pest house was still open to receive patients from quarantined vessels. The hospital building is a rectangular, roofless building, 7 m by 5.5 m externally with a two–roomed extension on its east side. The walls of the building are 0.6 m wide and 3 m high, and are constructed of mortared rubble with other details picked out in larger stones. The building has recently been repaired and stabilized to prevent its collapse with the help of English Heritage funding through the Isles of Scilly (IOS) Grant Scheme, administered by Cornwall and Isles of Scilly Community Grants Programme (CIOS). There is also a graveyard associated with the pest house which is known to include the grave of a 27-year-old naval surgeon who was sent to treat the sick and died within a week himself, and various passengers from Africa and Asia who also died at the station.

== Wildlife and ecology ==
The island is part of the St Helen's (with Northwethel and Men-a-vaur) Site of Special Scientific Interest (SSSI) and is designated for its rare flora and breeding seabirds. The SSSI was first notified in 1971, re-notified in 1986 and covers all land above the mean high-water mark.

=== Flora ===
In 1940 the highest land on St Helen's was covered in maritime heath with ling (Calluna vulgaris) and bell heather (Erica cinerea) which was destroyed by fires from incendiary bombs from German aircraft during World War II. There were further fires during the dry weather of 1949, and when J E Lousley surveyed the vegetation in 1957 the soil was only one or two inches deep, grey and with granite chips. The most abundant plant was buck's-horn plantain (Plantago coronopus) and English stonecrop (Sedum anglicum). The fires probably also affected the frequency and cover of the lichens and bryophytes. At the time of the publication of Lousley's flora (1971) the vegetation had still not reverted to heath and by 1987 Hottentot fig (Carpobrotus edulis) had spread over much of the area. By 2002 much of this plant had disappeared possibly because of salt spray, or because of unusually cold weather. At the last SSSI assessment in 2009, vegetation on the island including the heath was considered to be in ″a favourable condition″. Lousley found large areas of cliffs and rocks were also covered with Hottentot fig which is spread by gulls carrying the plant to their nests. It can then take root and spread over bare ground and vegetation.

The lower lying ground to the south of the hill, has deeper soils with black humus and white sand grains. The flora is dominated by a tangle of bracken (Pteridium aquilinum) and bramble (Rubus ulmifolius) and is comparatively rich compared with many of the other islands; probably because St Helen's has less salt spray due to its comparatively sheltered position being surrounded by other islands. The long history of human settlement has also allowed for the establishment of additional species, either by human introduction, or by grazing which has helped to develop deeper soils on the lower ground. Around the pest house there is rank grassland and scrub with flowering plants such as hemlock (Conium maculatum), hogweed (Heracleum sphondylium) and good populations of balm-leaved figwort (Scrophularia scorodonia) which is spreading in one area. Unusually for a small Scillonian island there is also grey willow (Salix cinerea), wood spurge (Euphorbia amygdaloides) and small reed (Calamagrostis epigejos). In the past the areas around the buildings would have been cultivated or grazed and North reported the island was uncultivated during his visit in 1850. To allow access for visitors to the August church service, the tall vegetation is cut around the ruined buildings and on the path from the landing place.

On the north-west side of the island there is an area of maritime grassland with abundant thrift (Armeria maritima), sea beet (Beta vulgaris subsp. maritima) and tree mallow (Lavatera arborea). Also on the north side and directly opposite Round Island, Issac North (1850) found a chasm richly covered in sea spleenwort (Asplenium marinum).

==== Shore dock ====
Shore dock (Rumex rupestris) is one of the rarer docks and a BAP species; it is one of the reasons why the Isles of Scilly is a Special Area of Conservation (SAC). It was recorded in 1957 by Lousley, but has not been seen since and is thought to be extinct on St Helen's. It was recorded nearby on Teän in 2005.

=== Fauna ===
The fauna of the outer islands of the Isles of Scilly is generally poorly recorded because of, both the difficulty of reaching them, and the length of the time spent.

==== Mammals ====
St Helen's has a long history of habitation and when Issac North visited the islands in 1850 he reported goats (Capra aegagrus hircus) and deer. The deer were still present in 1865, and in 1870 sheep (Ovis aries) were said to run wild. A 1919 guide book recorded St Helen's only inhabitants as goats, deer, rabbits and sea fowl. The Scilly shrew (Crocidura suaveolens) was seen on low cliffs in 1964 and rabbit (Oryctolagus cuniculus) has not been recorded since 1980.

==== Birds ====
Cooper (2006) recorded a few great black-backed gull (Larus marinus) nesting, a scattering of herring gull (Larus argentatus) and an overflow colony of kittiwake (Rissa tridactyla) on the eastern cliffs, while Parslow (2007) records a large colony of lesser black-backed gull (Larus fuscus) and a small colony of puffin (Fratercula arctica). The Seabird 2000 breeding seabird survey recorded five occupied nests of Manx shearwater (Puffinus puffinus).

== Other islands in the St Helen’s group ==
=== Foreman’s Island ===
Foreman's Island (grid reference SV900160) is a 0.37 hectares (0.91 acres) low-lying island on the south side of St Helen's Pool between Teän and Tresco. It is one of a group of rocks and islets of importance for breeding seabirds. The common froghopper (Philaenus spumarius) has been recorded on Foreman's.

=== Men-a-vaur ===
Men-a-vaur (grid reference SV893175) is to the north-west of St Helen's and consists of three granite slabs covering an area of 0.55 hectares (1.4 acres) and rising to 38 metres (125 ft). It is part of the SSSI for its seabirds with eight breeding species. The razorbill (Alca torda) population is of national importance and together with fulmar (Fulmaris glacialis) and guillemot (Uria aalge) are the largest in the Isles of Scilly; the other species are kittiwake, great black-backed gull, lesser black-backed gull, herring gull, shag (Gulosus aristotelis) and puffin. Peregrine falcon (Falco peregrinus) and raven (Corvus corax) breed in some years.

Lousley recorded common scurvygrass (Cochlearia officinalis), tree mallow and a species of orache (Atriplex spp) although flowering plants are not a permanent feature. The rare rove beetle, (Omalium allardi) has been recorded.

=== Northwethel ===
Northwethel (grid reference SV895163) is a 4.63 hectares (11.4 acres) and 15.2 m (50 ft) high island in Old Grimsby Channel, off Grimble Porth, Tresco. The island consists of two hills connected by a low stretch of land. There is a sandy beach at the landing area on the south and a small brackish pool behind the sea bank.

Human habitation dates back to the Bronze Age with a cairn field of up to nine cairns including one that has a chamber 5.5 m (18 ft) in diameter with two cover stones still in place. The chamber is oriented east to west and 3.0 m (10 ft) long, 1.36 m (4.5 ft) wide at the centre and 0.45 m (18 in) at the entrance. There is also a prehistoric field system and a settlement with (probably) six hut circles. Some of the hut circles are integrated into the field walls of which there are three or four irregular shaped fields 30.0 m (98 ft) to 50.0 m (164 ft) across. The hut circles have an internal width of 4.0 m (13 ft) to 6.0 m (20 ft). A number of finds of flint, bone and pottery of unknown date have been deposited with the Isles of Scilly Museum on St Mary's. It is said that 1,500 Parliamentarians landed on the island in the mistaken belief they were on Tresco and a roughly rectangular enclosure with two sides of drystone walling is a possible ″Parliamentary army shelter″. On the west side of the island are the remains of a rusting ship.

The botanist J E Lousley visited the island one afternoon in May 1957 and recorded fifty-four species of plant, despite finding most of the island covered in a tangle of bracken and bramble to 1 m (3 ft) high and difficult to penetrate. Unusual plants (for the Isles of Scilly) in the brackish pool are sea-milkwort (Glaux maritima), fennel-leaved pondweed (Stuckenia pectinata) and red goosefoot (Chenopodium rubrum). A visit by John Hunt in the 1980s found a ″healthy″ growth of bracken. The fern soft shield-fern (Polystichum setiferum) once thought to be very rare on the islands has now been found on all the inhabited islands (except Bryher) and curiously also on Northwethel.

=== Round Island ===
Round Island (grid reference SV901177) is a 4.09 hectares (10.1 acres) island to the north of St Helen's with an unmanned lighthouse on the summit. It is part of the Pentle Bay, Merrick and Round Islands Site of Special Scientific Interest (SSSI).

=== Teän ===
Teän (grid reference SV908164) is a 16.13 hectares (39.9 acres) island between St Helen's, to the north-west and St Martin's to the east. The island has a long history of habitation and was designated as the Teän Site of Special Scientific Interest (SSSI) in 1971. It is included in the Isles of Scilly Geological Conservation Review for the linking of islands by a sandy bar or tombolo.
