= Arthur Davies (tenor) =

Welsh tenor singer (1941–2018)

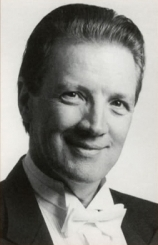

Davies singing "Arafa Don" by Richard Samuel Hughes (opening bars, recorded 1995)

Arthur Davies (11 April 1941 – 8 August 2018) was a Welsh tenor who had an active international performance career from the 1970s through the 1990s. He performed leading roles with The Royal Opera in London, the Welsh National Opera, the Scottish Opera, and the English National Opera.

== Life and career ==
Born in Wrexham, Wales, Davies was a graduate of the Royal Northern College of Music where he was a pupil of tenor Joseph Ward. In 1972 he made his professional opera debut as Squeak in Benjamin Britten's Billy Budd at the Welsh National Opera (WNO). He subsequently performed numerous times for the WNO in parts like Count Almaviva in Rossini's The Barber of Seville, Don José in Bizet's Carmen, Ferrando in Mozart's Così fan tutte, Nemorino in Donizetti's L'elisir d'amore, Rodolfo in Puccini's La bohème, and the title role in Britten's Albert Herring.

In 1976 Davies made his debut at The Royal Opera in London in the world premiere of Hans Werner Henze's We Come to the River. He returned to the Royal Opera as Alfredo in Verdi's La traviata, Foresto in his Attila, Pinkerton in Puccini's Madama Butterfly, and Steva in Janáček's Jenůfa. He sang many roles for the English National Opera, including Don Ottavio in Mozart's Don Giovanni, the Duke of Mantua in Verdi's Rigoletto (creating the role in Jonathan Miller's mafioso version – also at the Metropolitan Opera in 1984 and recorded), Gabriele Adorno in his Simon Boccanegra, Lensky in Tchaikovsky's Eugene Onegin, and the title roles in Gounod's Faust and Massenet's Werther, among others.

While Davies primarily performed in the UK, he occasionally performed elsewhere. He made his United States debut in 1985 at the Lyric Opera of Chicago as Don José. In 1990 he made his debut at the Cincinnati Opera as Faust and returned there in 1995 to portray the title role in Giordano's Andrea Chénier. He went on to perform the latter role widely for performances at the Bolshoi Theater in Moscow, the Leipzig Opera, the Municipal Theatre of Santiago, Chile, the New Orleans Opera, the Teatro Nacional de São Carlos in Lisbon, and the Vlaamse Opera in Belgium. He took the role of Foresto for his debut at the Teatro Colón in Buenos Aires in 1994. He sang Gerontius in the first Russian performance of the oratorio The Dream of Gerontius by Elgar in April 1983 conducted by Yevgeny Svetlanov.

From 1998 to 1999 Davies taught vocal studies at the Welsh College of Music and Drama in Cardiff.

The Opera magazine obituary noted Davies's "easy, warmly communicative stage presence, a ringingly lyrical tenor sound and excellent diction". On retiring from the stage he ran a pub in Swansea.
