= The Saga of King Olaf =

Poem

"The Saga of King Olaf" is a poetic sequence by American poet Henry Wadsworth Longfellow, published in 1863 as part of his book Tales of a Wayside Inn.

== Overview ==
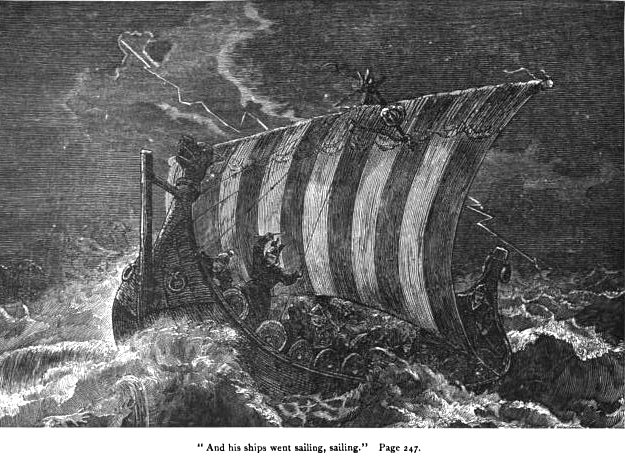
"And his ships went sailing, sailing", 1899 illustration, from "The Saga of King Olaf"

"The Saga of King Olaf" is written in twenty-two parts and follows the adventures of King Olaf Tryggvason of Norway, spurred to avenge his slain father and reclaim his kingdom by the Norse god Thor. It is the longest section of Longfellow's 1863 book Tales of a Wayside Inn, where it is presented as "The Musician's Tale". The Musician, in turn, is Longfellow's tribute to Norwegian violinist Ole Bull.

It is also the oldest part of the book; Longfellow began writing it as early as 1856. Before 1850, Longfellow had also written a poem in imitation of Icelandic poetic form called "The Challenge of Thor", which was repurposed as an introductory to the sequence. Longfellow scholar Christoph Irmscher notes it as "one of Longfellow's most accomplished tales". The diversity of meters in the 22-part sequence also displays Longfellow's virtuosity as a poet.

The content of the poems draws heavily from the Heimskringla and ultimately implies little difference between the symbols of Thor's hammer and Christ's cross. Longfellow relied on a translation by Samuel Laing published in 1844 and which Longfellow read in 1849, though he was aware of the original version in Swedish ten years earlier. Ultimately, he cut down the 123 saga chapters to only 22 and focused mostly on the confrontation between paganism and Christianity in Norway.

== Response ==
Longfellow's friend and fellow writer Nathaniel Hawthorne was particularly pleased by "The Saga of King Olaf". He wrote to him specifically of the segment of "The Building of the Long Serpent": "By some inscrutable magic you contrive to suggest a parallel picture of a modern frigate."

The work was the favorite poem of American President Theodore Roosevelt. He compared the inspirational nature of the poem to "The Battle Hymn of the Republic" by Julia Ward Howe. As he wrote to literary critic Martha Baker Dunn, "if a boy or girl likes [the Saga] well enough to learn most of it by heart and feel the spirit of it, just as they ought to like Julia Ward Howe's battle hymn, they will always have in them something to which an appeal for brave action can be made."

=== Musical adaptations ===
Composer Dudley Buck created two musical adaptations of portions of the poem, the cantatas The Nun of Nidaros in 1879 and King Olaf's Christmas in 1891. Longfellow unsuccessfully sought the assistance of John Sullivan Dwight in getting the former performed. British composer Edward Elgar set an adaptation of the text which was first performed in 1896.
