= Medieval studies =

Academic interdisciplinary study of the Middle Ages

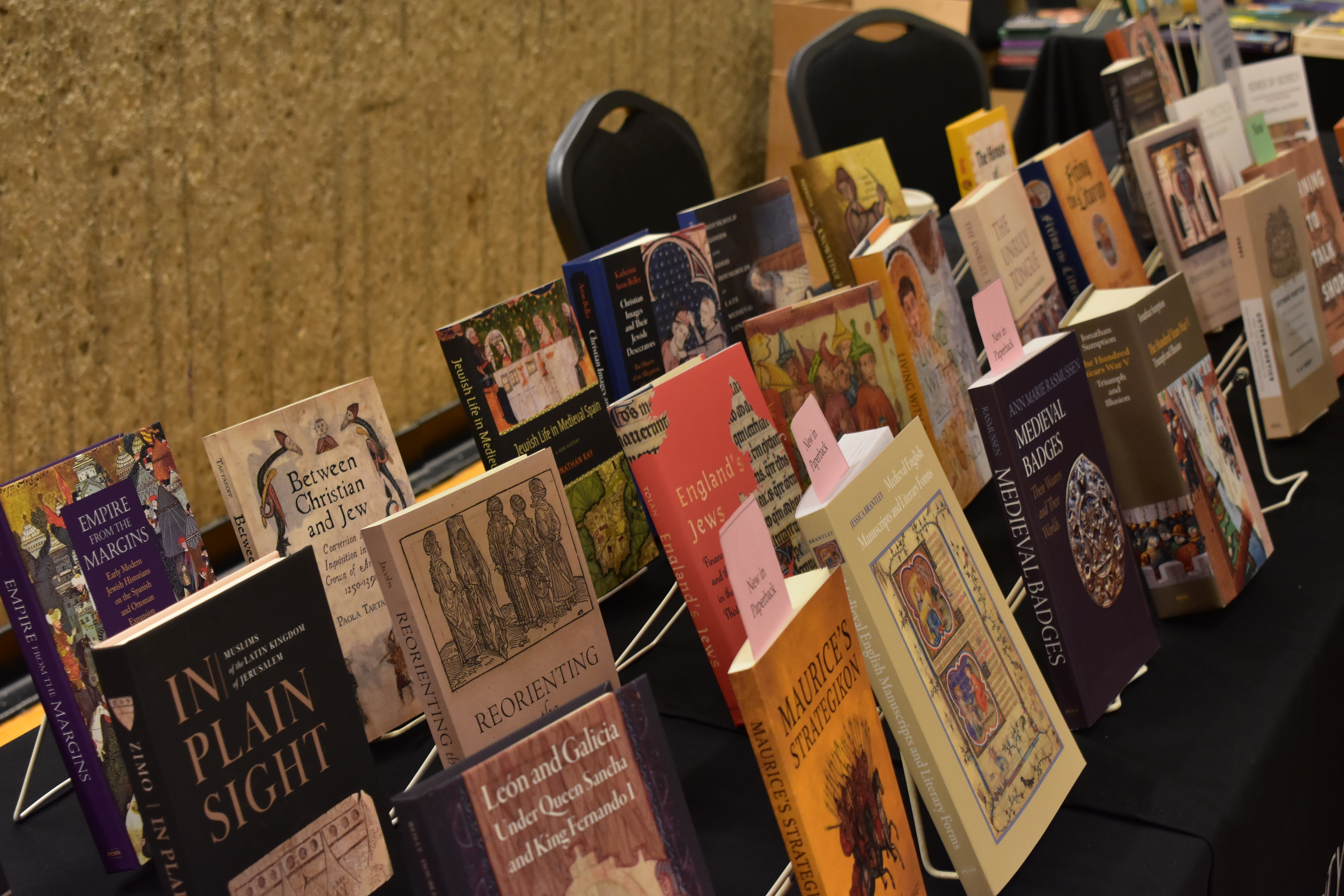
Books on medieval history and culture by various medievalists, displayed at an academic conference (2026)

Medieval studies is the academic interdisciplinary study of the Middle Ages. A historian who studies medieval studies is called a medievalist.

== Institutional development ==
The term 'medieval studies' began to be adopted by academics in the opening decades of the twentieth century, initially in the titles of books like G. G. Coulton's Ten Medieval Studies (1906), to emphasize a more interdisciplinary approach to a historical subject. A major step in institutionalising this field was the foundation of the Mediaeval (now Medieval) Academy of America in 1925. In American and European universities the term medieval studies provided a coherent identity to centres composed of academics from a variety of disciplines including archaeology, art history, architecture, history, literature and linguistics. The Institute of Mediaeval Studies at St. Michael's College of the University of Toronto became the first centre of this type in 1929; it is now the Pontifical Institute of Mediaeval Studies (PIMS) and is part of the University of Toronto. It was soon followed by the Medieval Institute at the University of Notre Dame in Indiana, which was founded in 1946 but whose roots go back to the establishment of a Program of Medieval Studies in 1933. As with many of the early programs at Roman Catholic institutions, it drew its strengths from the revival of medieval scholastic philosophy by such scholars as Étienne Gilson and Jacques Maritain, both of whom made regular visits to the university in the 1930s and 1940s.

These institutions were preceded in the United Kingdom, in 1927, by the establishment of the idiosyncratic Department of Anglo-Saxon, Norse and Celtic, at the University of Cambridge. Although Anglo-Saxon, Norse and Celtic was limited geographically (to the British Isles and Scandinavia) and chronologically (mostly the early Middle Ages), it promoted the interdisciplinarity characteristic of Medieval Studies and many of its graduates were involved in the later development of Medieval Studies programmes elsewhere in the UK. Around the same time as the first North American Medieval Studies institutions were founded, the UK saw the development of some scholarly societies with a similar remit, including the Oxford Society for the Study of Medieval Languages and Literature (1932) and its offshoot the Manchester Medieval Society (1933).

With university expansion in the late 1960s and early 1970s encouraging interdisciplinary cooperation, centres similar to (and partly inspired by) the Toronto Pontifical Institute of Mediaeval Studies were established in England at University of Reading (1965), at University of Leeds (1967) and the University of York (1968), and in the United States at Fordham University (1971). Elsewhere in Europe, one may cite the Centro italiano di studi sull'alto medioevo in Spoleto (Italy, 1952), the Centre d'études supérieures de civilisation médiévale in Poitiers (France, 1953), the Mediävistisches Institut in Fribourg (Switzerland, 1965) or the Institut d'études médiévales in Leuven (Belgium, 1966).

The 1990s saw a further wave of Medieval-Studies foundations, partly prompted by the dynamism brought to the field by its embracing of postmodernist thought and the associated rise of neo-medievalism in popular culture. This included centres at King's College London (1988), the University of Bristol (1994), the University of Sydney (1997) and Bangor University (2005), and the merging of the Medieval History and Medieval Language and Literature sections of the British Academy to create a Medieval Studies section.

Medieval studies is buoyed by a number of annual international conferences which bring together thousands of professional medievalists, including the International Congress on Medieval Studies, at Kalamazoo Michigan, U.S., and the International Medieval Congress at the University of Leeds. There are a number of journals devoted to medieval studies, including: Speculum (an organ of the Medieval Academy of America founded in 1925 and based in Cambridge, Massachusetts), Medium Ævum (the journal of the Society for the Study of Medieval Languages and Literature, founded in 1932), Mediaeval Studies (based in the Pontifical Institute of Medieval Studies and founded in 1939), the Bulletin de Philosophie Médiévale, Mediaevalia, Comitatus, Viator, Traditio, Medieval Worlds, and the Journal of Medieval History.

Another part of the infrastructure of the field is the International Medieval Bibliography.

== Historiographical development ==
The term "Middle Ages" first began to be common in English-language history-writing in the early nineteenth century. Henry Hallam's 1818 View of the State of Europe during the Middle Ages has been seen as a key stage in the promotion of the term, along with Ruskin's 1853 Lectures on Architecture. The term medievalist was, correspondingly, coined by English-speakers in the mid-nineteenth century.

The concept of the Middle Ages was first developed by Renaissance humanists as a means for them to define their own era as new and different from what came before—whether a renewal of Classical Antiquity (the Renaissance) or what came to be called modernity. This gave nineteenth-century Romantic scholars, in particular, the intellectual freedom to imagine the Middle Ages as an anti-modernist utopia—whether a place nostalgically to fantasise about a more conservative, religious, and hierarchical past or a more egalitarian, beautiful, and innocent one.

European study of the medieval past was characterised in the nineteenth and early twentieth centuries by romantic nationalism, as emergent nation-states sought to legitimise new political formations by claiming that they were rooted in the distant past. The most important example of this use of the Middle Ages was the nation-building that surrounded the unification of Germany. Narratives which presented the nations of Europe as modernizing by building on, yet also developing beyond, their medieval heritage, were also important facets underpinning justifications of European colonialism and imperialism during the New Imperialism era. Some scholars of the medieval era in the United States also used these concepts to justify their westward expansion across the North American continent. These colonialist and imperialist connections meant that medieval studies during the 19th and 20th centuries played a role in the emergence of white supremacism.

However, the early twentieth century also saw the increasing professionalisation of research on the Middle Ages. In this context, researchers tended to resist the idea that the Middle Ages were distinctively different from modernity. Instead they argued the so-called 'continuity thesis' that institutions conventionally associated with modernity in Western historiography like nationalism, the emergence of states, colonialism, scientific thought, art for its own sake, or people's conception of themselves as individuals all had a history stretching back into the Middle Ages, and that understanding their medieval history was important to understanding their character in the twentieth century. Twentieth-century Medieval Studies were influenced by approaches associated with the rise of social sciences such as economic history and anthropology, epitomised by the influential Annales School. In place of what the Annalistes called histoire événementielle, this work favoured study of large questions over long periods.

In the wake of the Second World War, the role of medievalism in European nationalism led to greatly diminished enthusiasm for medieval studies within the academy—though nationalist deployments of the Middle Ages still existed and remained powerful. The proportion of medievalists in history and language departments fell, encouraging staff to collaborate across different departments; state funding of and university support for archaeology expanded, bringing new evidence but also new methods, disciplinary perspectives, and research questions forward; and the appeal of interdisciplinarity grew. Accordingly, medieval studies turned increasingly away from producing national histories, towards more complex mosaics of regional approaches that worked towards a European scope, partly correlating with post-War Europeanisation. An example from the apogee of this process was the large European Science Foundation project The Transformation of the Roman World that ran from 1993 to 1998.

Amidst this process, from the 1980s onwards medieval studies increasingly responded to intellectual agendas set by postmodern critical theory and cultural studies, with empiricism and philology being challenged by or harnessed to topics like the history of the body. This movement tended to challenge the progressivist account of the Middle Ages as belonging to a continuum of social development that begat modernity and instead to see the Middle Ages as radically different from the present. Its recognition that scholars' views are shaped by their own time led to the study of medievalism—the post-medieval use and abuse of the Middle Ages—becoming an integral part of Medieval Studies.

In the twenty-first century, globalisation led to arguments that post-war Europeanisation had drawn too tight a boundary around medieval studies, this time at the borders of Europe, with Muslim Iberia and the Orthodox Christian east seen in western European historiography as having an ambivalent relevance to medieval studies. Thus a range of medievalists have begun working on writing global histories of the Middle Ages—while, however, navigating the risk of imposing Eurocentric terminologies and agendas on the rest of the world. By 2020, this movement was being characterised as the "global turn" in Medieval Studies. Correspondingly, the UCLA Center for Medieval and Renaissance Studies, founded in 1963, changed its name in 2021 to UCLA Center for Early Global Studies. The claim to a "global turn", however, also necessarily implied that traditionally Eurocentric Medieval Studies needed to contemplate its relationship to the New World, for example by exploring the role of medieval ideas in post-medieval European colonialism. Thus in 2020, the Bitterroot Salish scholar Tarren Andrews opined that "we find ourselves today—quietly (and somewhat nervously) embracing an Indigenous turn" in Medieval Studies.

== Centres for medieval studies ==
Many Centres / Centers for Medieval Studies exist, usually as part of a university or other research and teaching facility. Umberella organisations for these bodies include the Fédération Internationale des Instituts d’Etudes Médiévales (FIDEM) (founded 1987) and Co-operative for Advancement of Research through Medieval European Network (CARMEN). Some notable ones include:

- The Centre for Medieval Studies, Bergen (Medieval Research Cluster since 2012), Norway, at the University of Bergen (Official site)
- The Department of Medieval Studies, CEU at the Central European University (Vienna and Budapest) (Official site)
- Groupe d'Anthropologie Historique de l'Occident Médiéval at the École des hautes études en sciences sociales, France (Official site)
- The Mediävistisches Institut, Fribourg, Switzerland, at the University of Fribourg (Official site)
- The Institute for Medieval Studies, Leeds, UK, at the University of Leeds (Official site)
- The Centre d'Études sur le Moyen Âge et la Renaissance, Leuven, Belgium, at the Catholic University of Leuven (official site)
- The Liverpool Centre for Medieval and Renaissance Studies at the University of Liverpool, UK (Official site)
- CMRS Center for Early Global Studies, at University of California, Los Angeles, USA (Official site)
- CMEMS Center for Medieval and Early Modern Studies, at Stanford University, USA (Official site)
- The Centre d'Études médiévales de Montpellier or Center for Medieval Studies at the university of Montpellier, France (Official site)
- The Center for Medieval Studies, Minnesota at the University of Minnesota, USA (Official site)
- The Medieval Institute, Notre Dame at the University of Notre Dame, Indiana, USA (Official site)
- Oxford Medieval Studies at the University of Oxford, UK (Official Site)
- The Laboratoire de médiévistique occidentale de Paris or Paris Laboratory for Western Medieval Studies at the Panthéon-Sorbonne University, France (Official site)
- The Center for Medieval Studies, Pennsylvania at Pennsylvania State University, USA (Official site)
- The Centre d'études supérieures de civilisation mediévale or Center of Advanced Studies in Medieval Civilization at the University of Poitiers, France (Official site)
- The Centre for Medieval Studies, Prague at Charles University in Prague and the Czech Academy of Sciences, Czech Republic (Official site)
- The Graduate Centre for Medieval Studies, Reading at the University of Reading, UK (Official site)
- The Institute for Medieval Studies, Lisbon at the Nova University of Lisbon, Portugal (Official site)
- Institut für Realienkunde des Mittelalters und der frühen Neuzeit at the Paris Lodron Universität Salzburg, Austria (Official site)
- The Centre for Medieval and Renaissance Culture at the University of Southampton, UK (Official site)
- The Centre for Medieval Studies, Sydney at the University of Sydney, Australia (Official site)
- The Centre for Medieval Studies, Toronto at the University of Toronto, Canada (Official site)
- The Pontifical Institute of Mediaeval Studies at the University of Toronto, Canada (Official site)
- The Utrecht Centre for Medieval Studies at the Utrecht University, The Netherlands (Official site)
- The Centre for Medieval Studies, York at the University of York, UK (Official site)
- The St Andrews Institute of Mediaeval Studies at the University of St Andrews, UK (Official site)
- The Turku Centre for Medieval and Early Modern Studies at the University of Turku, Finland (Official site)
- The Centre for Medieval Studies at Tallinn University, Estonia (Official site)
- The Center for Medieval Studies at the University of Bucharest, Romenia (Official site)
- The Centre for Medieval Studies, Ivano-Frankivsk at Vasyl Stefanyk Precarpathian National University, Ukraine (Official site)
- The Centre for Medieval and Renaissance Research, University of Winchester, UK (Official site)

== See also ==
- Medievalism
- Canadian Society of Medievalists
- Conferences in medieval studies
- Digital Medievalist
- Medieval Academy of America
- Renaissance studies
- Renaissance of the 12th century
- Société Internationale pour l'Étude de la Philosophie Médiévale
