= Vincent Gillespie =

English literary scholar (1954–2025)

Professor Vincent Gillespie FBA FSA FRHistS
- Born: 11 February 1954; Liverpool, England
- Died: 13 March 2025 (aged 71)
- Occupations: Literary scholar and academic
- Title: J. R. R. Tolkien Professor of English Literature and Language
- Children: 2

Academic background
- Education: St Edward's College
- Alma mater: Keble College, Oxford
- Thesis: The literary form of the Middle English pastoral manual with particular reference to the Speculum Christiani and some related texts (1981)
- Doctoral advisor: Douglas Gray

Academic work
- Discipline: English studies
- Sub-discipline: Middle English literature; Medieval literature; Christianity in the Middle Ages; Print culture
- Institutions: University of Reading; St Anne's College, Oxford; Lady Margaret Hall, Oxford

Vincent Gillespie FBA FSA FRHistS (11 February 1954 – 13 March 2025) was an English literary scholar who was Emeritus J. R. R. Tolkien Professor of English Literature and Language at the University of Oxford. He was editor of the Exeter Medieval Texts and Studies Series from 2002 until 2023, and was the Honorary Director of the Early English Text Society from 2013 until 2023, having previously served as its Executive Secretary from 2004 until 2013. His major research area was late medieval English literature. He published over sixty articles and book chapters ranging from medieval book history, through Geoffrey Chaucer and William Langland, to the medieval mystics such as Richard Rolle and Julian of Norwich. He had a special interest in the medieval English Carthusians, and in Syon Abbey, the only English house of the Birgittine order (founded 1415). In 2001, he published Syon Abbey, Corpus of British Medieval Library Catalogues 9, an edition and analysis of the late-medieval library registrum of the Birgittine brethren of Syon Abbey. He was the author of Looking in Holy Books, and the forthcoming A Short History of Medieval English Mysticism. He was the co-editor, with Kantik Ghosh, of After Arundel: Religious Writing in Fifteenth-Century England, with Susan Powell of A Companion to the Early Printed Book in Britain, 1476–1558, with Samuel Fanous of The Cambridge Companion to Medieval English Mysticism, and with Anne Hudson of Probable Truth: Editing Medieval Texts from Britain in the Twenty-First Century.

== Early life and career ==
Gillespie was born in Liverpool, and educated at St Edward's College. After undergraduate and graduate studies at Keble College, Oxford, he lectured at the University of Reading from 1977 to 1980. He was a tutorial fellow of St Anne's College, Oxford, from 1980 to 2004, where he held a variety of college offices, including Senior Common Room (SCR) president, dean, fellow librarian and vice-principal.

Gillespie moved to a professorial fellowship of Lady Margaret Hall in 2004 on his election as the third Tolkien Professor (in succession to Douglas Gray, his doctoral supervisor, and Paul Strohm). He retired from the chair in September 2021, becoming emeritus professor, and was succeeded by Marion Turner.

In 2003 he was elected a Fellow of the Royal Historical Society (FRHistS). He was also a Fellow of the Society of Antiquaries of London, and a Fellow of the English Association. In 2013 he was elected a Fellow of the British Academy (FBA). Together with Henrike Lähnemann, he was Co-President of Oxford Medieval Studies 2017-18. He was an honorary fellow of St Anne's College and Keble College Oxford, and a senior research fellow of Campion Hall, Oxford following his retirement. From 2024 until his death in 2025, he was an Honorary Professor in the School of English at the University of St Andrews.

Throughout his Oxford career Gillespie supervised around 40 doctoral theses. He was an active fundraiser for the English Faculty during his time in the Tolkien chair, raising £9 million in total, £4.2 million of which went towards the endowment of the Tolkien chair itself.

== Personal life and death ==
Gillespie was married to Peggy and they had two sons together, Thomas and Edward. He was diagnosed with prostate cancer in 2014 and continued his academic work while receiving treatment for it. He died on 13 March 2025, at the age of 71.

== Bibliography ==
- The English Medieval Book: Essays in Memory of Jeremy Griffiths (co-edited with A. S. G. Edwards and Ralph Hanna; London: British Library, 2000)
- Syon Abbey (London: British Library, 2001)
- After Arundel: Religious Writing in Fifteenth-Century England (co-edited with Kantik Ghosh; Turnhout: Brepols, 2011)
- The Cambridge Companion to Medieval English Mysticism (co-edited with Samuel Fanous; Cambridge: Cambridge University Press, 2011)
- Looking in Holy Books: Essays on Late Medieval Religious Writing in England (Turnhout: Brepols, 2011)
- Probable Truth: Editing Medieval Texts from Britain in the Twenty-First Century (co-edited with Anne Hudson; Turnhout: Brepols, 2013)
- A Companion to the Early Printed Book in Britain, 1476-1558 (co-edited with Susan Powell; Cambridge: Cambridge University Press, 2013)
- The Chaucer Encyclopedia (co-edited with Richard Newhauser, Jessica Rosenfeld and Katie L. Walter; Chichester: Wiley Blackwell, 2023)
