= Index of Middle English Verse =

The Index of Middle English Verse (IMEV) is a bibliographic index of poetry in Middle English. Its first print publication, in 1943, was an extension of Carleton Brown's Register of Middle English Religious & Didactic Verse, augmented by the inclusion of secular verse. This edition, edited by Brown and Rossell Hope Robbins, contained entries for over 4,000 Middle English poems in more than 2,000 manuscripts. In 1965 the index was supplemented by Robbins and John L. Cutler. A digital edition, DIMEV, was launched in 2013. An updated edition, A New Index of Middle English Verse, edited by Julia Boffey and A. S. G. Edwards, was published in 2005.
