= Wife of Bath (disambiguation) =

The Wife of Bath is a character in "The Wife of Bath's Tale".

Wife of Bath may also refer to:

- The Wife of Bath (play), a 1713 play by John Gay
- The Wife of Bath: A Biography, a 2023 book by Marion Turner
- Rosa 'Wife of Bath', a rose cultivar
