= Boffey =

Boffey is a surname. Notable people with the surname include:

- Isabelle Boffey (born 2000), English middle-distance runner
- Julia Boffey (fl. from 1985), English medievalist
