= Torrent of Portyngale =

Torrent of Portyngale (archaic spelling for "Portugal") is a Middle English romance, composed around 1400, probably in the north Midlands. It is written in 12-line tail-rhyme stanzas, with the rhyme scheme AABCCBDDBEEB, and is number 983 in the Index of Middle English Verse. It is possible that it draws some inspiration from the Middle English Sir Eglamour of Artois. The romance survives only in the fifteenth-century East-Midland manuscript Manchester, Chetham's Library, MS 8009 (folios 76r-119v). The romance describes the tortuous efforts of the young earl's son Torrent to win the hand of Desonell, daughter of King Colomond of Portugal, against her father's wishes. Amongst other feats, Torrent fights five giants on different occasions and travels to Jerusalem. The romance ends with Torrent and Desonell's marriage and the uniting of their family. It has been characterised as 'perhaps the most critically neglected member of the Middle English verse romances'.

== Editions ==
- E. Adam, ed., Torrent of Portyngale. Reedited from the Unique MS in the Chetham Library, Manchester, Early English Text Society, extra series, 51 (London, 1887; rpt. 1973), http://www.gutenberg.org/files/35190/35190-h/35190-h.htm, https://archive.org/details/torrentofportyng00adamrich
- James Orchard Halliwell, ed., Torrent of Portugal: An English Metrical Romance (London: Russell Smith, 1842)
- Keith David Montgomery, 'Torrent of Portyngale: a critical edition' (unpublished PhD thesis, University of Auckland, 2008), http://hdl.handle.net/2292/4542.
- Online manuscript facsimile
