= Oxford Medieval Studies =

Research forum of the University of Oxford

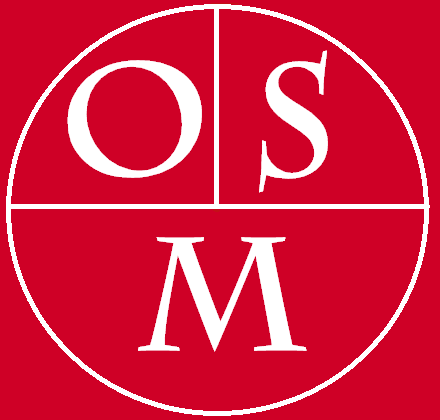

Oxford Medieval Studies, a research hub of the University of Oxford, is one of the largest Medieval studies forums in the world. It brings together over 200 academics at the university, and a large body of graduate students, to create a deliberately interdisciplinary community. A number of Oxford Research Centres are associated with Oxford Medieval Studies, including the Early Medieval Britain and Ireland centre, and the Oxford Centre for Late Antiquity. The current directors are Henrike Lähnemann and Lesley Smith. The Steering Group comprises members of the Faculty of English, Faculty of History, Faculty of Medieval and Modern Languages, Faculty of Theology, and grew out of a network programme of TORCH which archives the activities going back to 2015. Past presidents were Sophie Marnette, Vincent Gillespie, and Francis Leneghan.

Oxford Medieval Studies offers an interdisciplinary Master's degree (MSt) in Medieval Studies.

== Blog and YouTube ==
The forum maintains an active blog with reports of past events and upcoming opportunities and a YouTube channel, recording many of its previous talks and performances.

== Medieval Mystery Plays ==
Oxford Medieval Studies regularly stages a set of medieval mystery plays, in a range of medieval languages, at St Edmund Hall. These take place during Trinity term and are open to the public, and can be watched on YouTube.

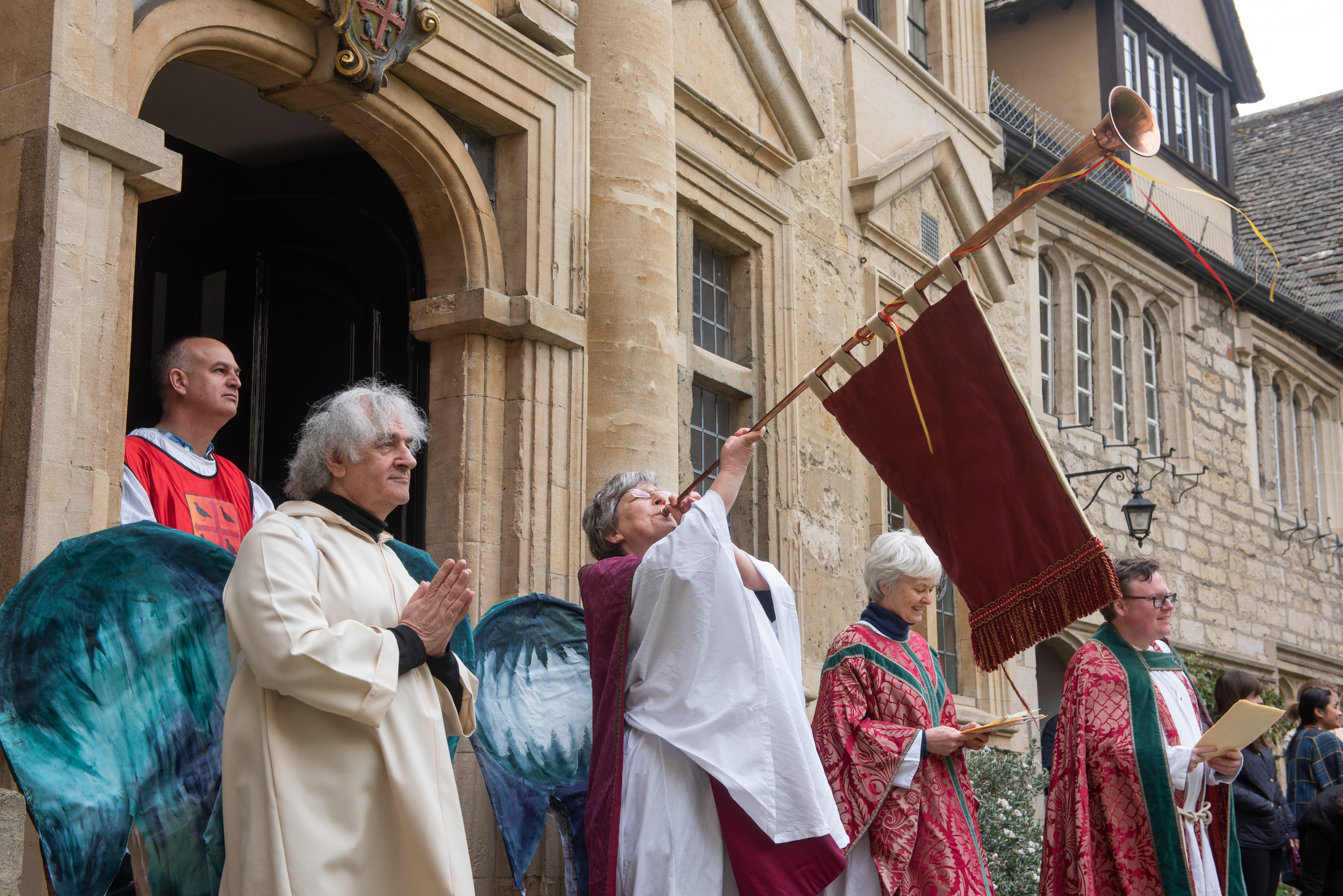
