= Sverre Bagge =

Norwegian historian

Sverre Håkon Bagge (born 7 August 1942 in Bergen) is a Norwegian historian.

He took his doctorate with the thesis Den politiske ideologi i Kongespeilet, published in 1979. From 1974 to 1991 he worked as an associate professor (førsteamanuensis) at the University of Bergen, and he became a professor there in 1991. Since 2003 he is the leader of the Centre for Medieval Studies, Bergen.

He is a member of the Norwegian Academy of Science and Letters.

== Selected bibliography ==
- Cross and Scepter: The Rise of the Scandinavian Kingdoms from the Vikings to the Reformation, 2014
- From Viking Stronghold to Christian Kingdom: State Formation in Norway, c. 900-1350, 2010
- Den politiske ideologi i Kongespeilet, 1979
- Høymiddelalderen, 1984, volume 8 in Cappelens Verdenshistorie
- Europa tar form, År 300 til 1300, 1986
- Norge i dansketiden 1380-1814, 1987 (with Knut Mykland)
- Society and Politics in Snorri Sturlusons Heimskringla, 1991
- Mennesket i middelalderens Norge: tanker, tro og holdninger 1000-1300, 1998
- Da boken kom til Norge, 2001, volume 1 in Norsk idéhistorie
