= J. R. R. Tolkien Professor of English Literature and Language =

The J. R. R. Tolkien Professorship of English Literature and Language was established at the University of Oxford in 1980 and named after the author, poet, philologist and academic J. R. R. Tolkien. It is "dedicated to the study of English and related literatures 1066-1550." The inaugural holder was Douglas Gray. In 2021 the future of the professorship was made secure by endowments from Mr and Mrs John Griffiths, and The Tolkien Trust.

== List of J. R. R. Tolkien Professors ==
- 1980–1997: Douglas Gray, FBA
- 1998–2003: Paul H. Strohm
- 2004–2021: Vincent Gillespie, FBA, FSA, FRHistS
- 2022-present: Marion Turner
