= New Index of Middle English Verse =

A New Index of Middle English Verse, edited by Julia Boffey and A. S. G. Edwards (published in London by the British Library in 2005) is a 344-page first-line index of English poems composed after the Old English period and before 1500. Its numbering system provides the standard way to refer to Middle English poems. In the assessment of James L. Harner and Angela Courtney, "based on firsthand examination of many of the entries [...] New Index of Middle English Verse is the essential resource for investigating verse of the period".

== Content ==
Most of the poems covered by the Index are found in manuscripts copied before c. 1500, but poems thought to have been composed before 1500 but attested later are also included.

"A typical entry includes first line, author, title, genre, length, verse form, a list of manuscripts including the verse, and early printed editions." Alongside its first-line index of poems, the New Index includes two further indices: one of manuscripts, and one of subjects, titles, and authors.

== Origins ==
The New Index is a revision and expansion of Carleton Brown and Russell Hope Robbins, The Index of Middle English Verse (New York: Columbia University Press, 1943), and the Supplement published by Robbins and John L. Cutler (Lexington: University of Kentucky Press, 1965), adding 1500 new records to the earlier indices, partly by recognising significant variants of poems more fully. The New Index retains the numbering system of its sources, but culls erroneous entries, poems dated to after 1500, and separate entries for extracts of longer poems. Post-1500 poems are covered by complementary resources produced by Dick Ringler.

== Addenda and complementary resources ==
- The Digital Index of Middle English Verse
- A. S. G. Edwards, "Identifying Individual Middle English Lyrics: NIMEV 2321, Etc.", Notes and Queries 60.1 (2013): 22–24.
- Ringler, William A. (1988). Bibliography and index of English verse printed, 1476-1558. London New York: Mansell. ISBN 978-0-7201-1892-6.
- Ringler, William A.; Rudick, Michael; Ringler, Susan Jane (1992). Bibliography and index of English verse in manuscript, 1501-1558. London New York: Mansell. ISBN 978-0-7201-2099-8.
