= Centre for Medieval Studies, Bergen =

Research institute in Norway

Coordinates: 60°23′15″N 5°19′4″E

The Centre for Medieval Studies at the University of Bergen, Norway, was founded as a Centre of Excellence by the Research Council of Norway. It operated from 2002 to 2012.

The organization's site defined its goal as: "to enhance our understanding of Europe as a whole, in the Middle Ages as well as today, from a peripheral point of view".

It was headed by Sverre Bagge.
