= Turku Centre for Medieval and Early Modern Studies =

- Type: research institute
- Established: 2009
- Parent institution: University of Turku
- Chairperson: Marika Räsänen
- Location: Turku, Finland, Turku, Finland
- Campus: Urban
- Website: https://www.utu.fi/en/university/faculty-of-humanities/tucemems

Turku Centre for Medieval and Early Modern Studies, (abbr. TUCEMEMS)is a research Centre of the University of Turku. The Centre encourages research in the fields of medieval and early modern studies. To achieve this aim, the Centre coordinates research of the different disciplines of the University. The Centre has also active international collaboration with various other centres and Universities around the world.

== Activity ==
TUCEMEMS had over 120 members in August 2014, from many separate departments and faculties of the University of Turku.

The Centre has active international cooperation with many universities. Many scholars from different countries have visited TUCEMEMS and given lectures or held courses on varying themes. TUCEMEMS has also organized international conferences for scholars, as the Framing Premodern desires –colloquium, organized in April 2014. The colloquium discussed the themes of sexuality and sexual control in medieval and early modern societies.

A very important form of activity for the Centre is the scholarly publication series, Crossing Boundaries: Turku Medieval and Early Modern Studies, published by Amsterdam University Press. TUCEMEMS has the general editorship of this scholarly series. The Centre has an Editorial Board consisting of professors and other researchers from the University of Turku, and an advisory board composed of professors and other experts from the relevant fields of study from multiple Universities from around the world.

The activities of the Centre include lectures, seminars and conferences on varying themes. The Centre organizes Monthly Talks, where researchers present their research themes to other scholars.

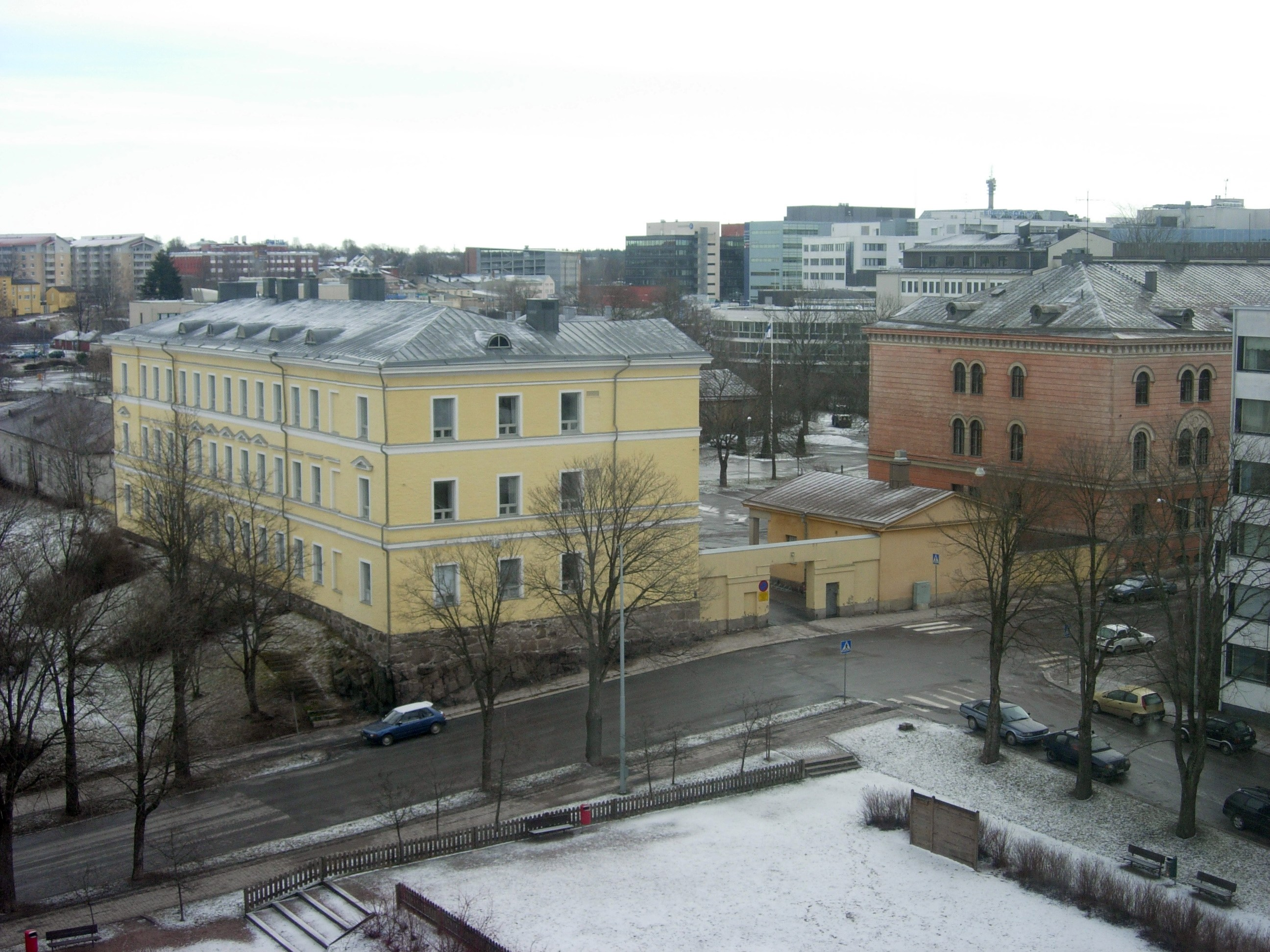
The Sirkkala Campus in Turku, were much of the activities of TUCEMEMS takes place.

=== Administration ===
TUCEMEMS has a board of ten Members and ten Deputies. The Board is chaired by a Chairperson, who from the beginning of the Centre has been Professor Marjo Kaartinen from the Department of Cultural History of the University of Turku. The Members of the board consists of Professors from the University of Turku, representing fields of study relevant to the chronological scope of the Centre.

The board decides of the budget and of the yearly strategy of the Centre. The board is nominated by the dean of the Faculty of Humanities.

New members of TUCEMEMS are accepted by the Chairperson. An individual can be accepted as a member if he or she is researching the medieval or early modern period. The person can be a postgraduate student, a post-doc researcher or a student writing their Master’s thesis, if he or she aims to continue to doctoral studies.

== History ==
TUCEMEMS was established in December 2009. The activities of the Centre expanded rapidly in 2010, at the same time as the number of members grew to around 70. The Centre also connected with other centres on the world. The activities included Monthly Talks, one symposium on Medieval and Early Modern Legal Court Records, and a three lecture series held by visiting professors and various local scholars. The Centre also funded research trips and conference journeys for some of its members.

In 2011 new activities were launched. The TUCEMEMS’ own research seminar started in the autumn, with six sessions held. The Centre also organised a lecture series for the general public. Theses studia generalia –lecture series have since been held every spring semester and have attracted considerable attention.

On 2012 the Centre published an anthology on the medieval and early modern Turku in Finnish. TUCEMEMS also participated in the organizing of Dies Medievales, the biannual conference of Finnish medievalists in Turku. The programme of the conference was both interdisciplinary and international, with four keynote lecturers from Finland, Sweden and France and 33 presentations in three languages.

In 2013 The Centre started co-operation with the Amsterdam University Press for the publishing of its own scholarly series, Crossing Boundaries: Turku Medieval and Early Modern Studies. The first publication of the series was Same-sex Sexuality in Later Medieval English Culture by Tom Linkinen. It came out 2015.
