= A. S. G. Edwards =

American academic and author (born 1942)

Anthony Stockwell Garfield Edwards (born 1942) is Professor of Medieval Manuscripts at the University of Kent. Having studied at the University of Reading and McMaster University, he earned his Ph.D. at the University of London.

Edwards is the co-editor of the Index of Middle English Prose (IMEP), currently in its twenty-third volume. Edwards is the author of such works as Middle English Prose: a critical guide to major authors and genres and editor of A Companion to Middle English Prose and The Life of St Edmund, King & Martyr: John Lydgate's illustrated verse life presented to Henry VI.

Edwards is also co-editor (with Julia Boffey) of the New Index of Middle English Verse (2005) and A Companion to Fifteenth-Century English Poetry, and co-editor with Vincent Gillespie and Ralph Hanna of The English Medieval Book: Studies in Memory of Jeremy Griffiths (2000).

His research has been funded by the Guggenheim Foundation and he was a Fellow in 1988-89.

He long served on the editorial board of the Book Collector and was a frequent contributor.
