= History of beliefs about the human body =

Attitudes about the human body throughout various times and cultures

The human body has been subject of much debate. How people are defined, and what defined them – be it their anatomy or their energy or both – depends on culture and time. Culture not only defines how sex is perceived but also how gender is defined. Today gender, sex, and identity continue to be of much debate and change based on what place and people are being examined.

The early modern idea of the body was a cultural ideal, an understanding and approach to how the body works and what place that body has in the world. All cultural ideals of the body in the early modern period deal with deficiencies and disorders within a body, commonly told through a male ideal. Ideas of the body in the early modern period form the history of how bodies should be and how to correct the body when something has gone wrong. Therefore, early modern conceptions of the body were not biological as there was not a restrictive biological view of the human body as established by modern science.

Conceptions of the body are primarily either eastern, based in China and involving practices such as Traditional chinese medicine, or western, which follows the Greek traditions of science and is more closely related to modern science despite original anatomists and ideas of the body being just as unscientific as Chinese practices.

== Historiography ==
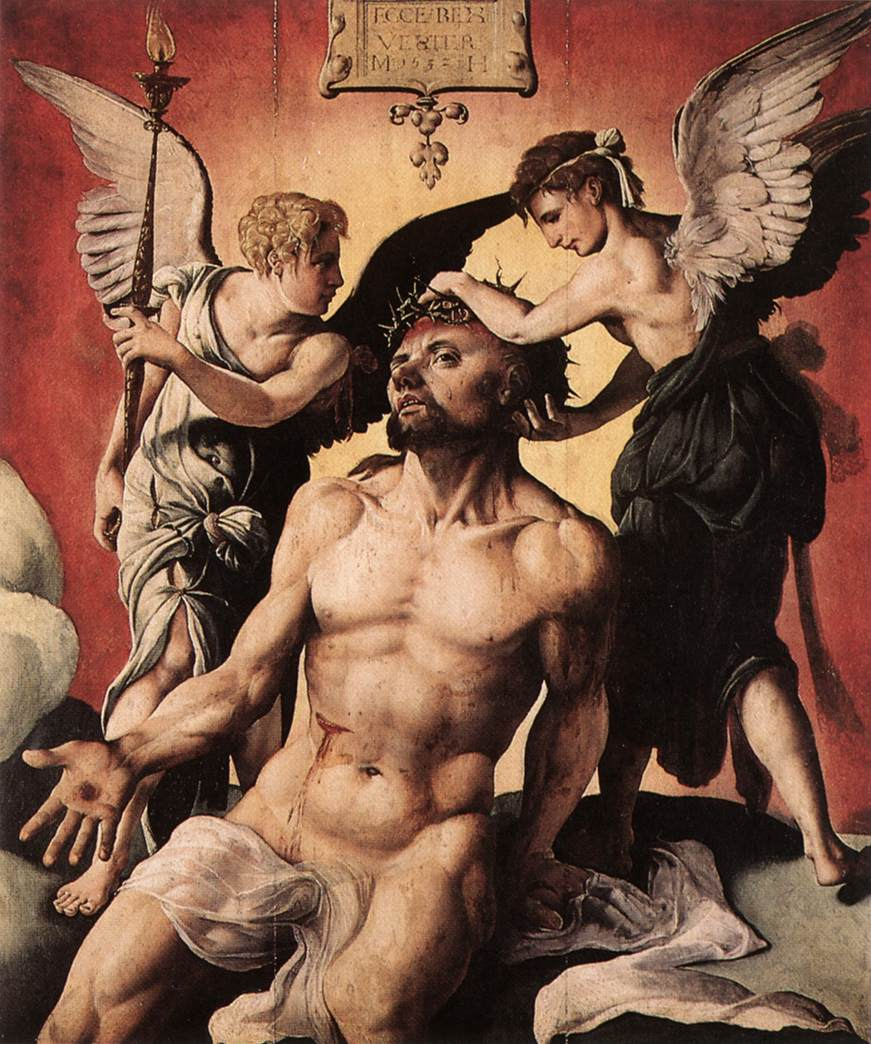
'Man of Sorrows' by Maarten van Heemskerck (1498–1574). Porter opened his article 'History of the Body' by discussing Renaissance paintings which drew attention to Christ's penis, and how scholars had ignored this aspect of them.

In Western historical research, scholars began investigating the cultural history of the human body in detail in the 1980s. The movement is particularly associated with the historian of medicine Roy Porter, whose 1991 article 'History of the Body' was a seminal study. 1995 saw the foundation of the journal Body and Society, by which time the field of the history of the body was already extensive and diverse.

Porter pointed out that Western historiography had previously assumed mind–body dualism (i.e. that the body is fundamentally separate from the mind or soul) and therefore that the cultural history of bodies as material objects had been overlooked: 'given the abundance of evidence available, we remain remarkably ignorant about how individuals and social groups have experienced, controlled, and projected their embodied selves. How have people made sense of the mysterious link between "self" and its extensions? How have they managed the body as an intermediary between self and society?' He emphasised that the history of the body is important to understanding histories of coercion and control, sex and gender, and other important but culturally varied aspects of human experience.

Another prominent voice in the field at the same time was Caroline Walker Bynum, whose 1988 Holy Feast and Holy Fast became a landmark study. Both Bynum and Porter noted that during the 1980s Western history of the body research drew on post-structuralist thought, such as Michel Foucault's ideas of biopolitics and biopower, which emphasised that state power is not abstract, but exercised through and over human bodies. But both expressed a concern that research was focusing too much on discourse about bodies, rather than on material bodies themselves. Drawing on Mikhail Bakhtin's 1965 Rabelais and His World, they promoted a more materially orientated direction in the history of the body.

Another seminal study around the same time was Thomas Laqueur's 1990 Making Sex: Body and Gender from Greeks to Freud, which explored the social importance of different conceptions of the sexed body over time.

== Ebers Papyrus ==
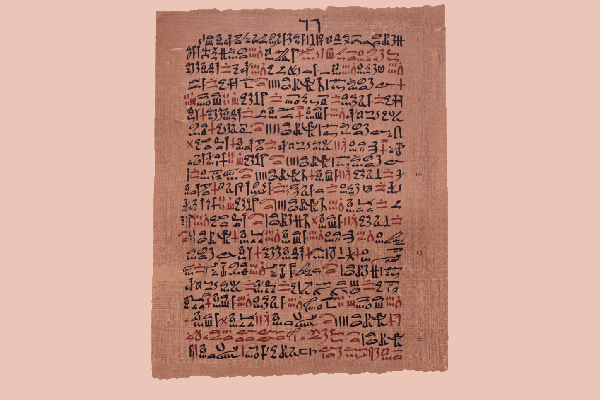
Ebers Papyrus from the National Library of Medicine

The Ebers Papyrus is an Egyptian medical text and is the oldest known record of the human body, dating back to 3000 BC. The Ebers Papyrus describes the body by physical examination and what can be felt. Clinical investigations such as the Pulse, percussion of the body, the recognition of diseased or disordered states.

“If thou examinst a swelling of the covering of his belly's horns above his pudenda (sex organs) then thou shalt place thy finger on it and examine his belly and knock on the fingers (percuss) if thou examinst his that has come out and has arisen by his cough. Then thou shalt say concerning it: it is a swelling of the covering of his belly. It is a disease which I will treat”.

The distinct medical tone focuses on what can be felt externally to infer the maladies of the body. The body was born in the correct state but could was fallible and fixable with the correct intervention and feeling and using the senses to identify what has gone wrong. The Ebers Papyrus refers to many god-like and spiritual infestations of the body that could not be explained at the time. Despite the explanations for maladies by spiritual rational, the interventions described to investigate and see the body were distinctly disconnected for the spirit or life force of the body and was principally about what could be seen or touched.

Descriptions of the exact placement of the heart within the body, the circulation of blood are in no doubt accurate as Egyptians practiced embalming their dead by removal of organs and placement of them in jars.

== Medical Body in Ancient Greece ==
Painting of Aristotle

Greek philosophers separated the body and the energy of the body into separate but equal and interacting categories. Aristotle defined the energy which gives the body its movement as the soul. The soul and the body are therefore linked but can remain separate entities. This is in refutation of Dualists who view the body and mind as separate states and should be treated and examined differently and Materialists who view all parts of the body, even the soul as having a physical manifestation in the body. Aristotle finds the middle ground and accepts both of these views, that the soul has aspects that cannot be felt by normal methods, and physical manifestations that can be felt.

"For even if one and being are spoken of in several ways, what is properly so spoken of is the actuality" — Aristotle in De Anima

Aristotle forms the idea of Hylomorphism, that the soul and the body are not capable of being split apart without destroying both in the process. Despite this idea of the body and the soul Aristotle viewed disorder in what could be seen and felt. He was a proponent of the humoral theory that classified disorder as imbalances of the 4 fluids of the body. Aristotle was unable to dissect humans but did so to many animals and was an early founder of comparative anatomy. Aristotle did contend quasi spiritual manifestations of the body principally through sexual distinctions. He wrote that the sex of humans:

“is determined by the male principle already contained in the semen. If this is not strong enough, then the opposite must necessarily come into existence, and the opposite of man is woman.”

Aristotle clearly superimposed man as the more important figure in men and women but presents an almost Qi like representation of how sexes are defined. Aristotle presents it as a physical manifestation in semen, but in context to his descriptions of the soul and body it is not clear that he meant something physical.

== European Judeo-Christian ==
European ideologies of the body define disorder as only things that can be touched or explored. If something could not be explored then intrusions into these areas were performed. Therefore, the body in Greek and European cultures is defined as being ailed by something physical, something that can be found and altered to produce order. Judeo-Christian ideologies have heavily influenced the definitions of the body and its disorders and therefore the male body is often explained in place of the female body.

=== The one-sex body model ===
A major intervention in the history of the body in the West was Thomas W. Laqueur's 1990 book Making Sex: Body and Gender from the Greeks to Freud. Laqueur argued that from the eighteenth century into the late twentieth, Western societies had generally thought of humans as having two fundamentally sexes, male and female. But Laqueur argued that from ancient times, the prevailing intellectual understanding of sex was that women were anatomically simply an inferior form of men. For example, Renaldus Columbus, writing about what he proposed as the discovery of the clitoris, stated that, "like a penis, "if you touch it, you will find it rendered a little harder and oblong to such a degree that it shows itself as a sort of male member." (There was much debate on the actual discovery of the clitoris between male European scientists and many claimed to have described it first: by dissecting the human body and writing down what was observed these European scientists could claim in their idea of the body that they had discovered or created new knowledge.) This one-sex model was seen as consistent, in Abrahamic thought, with the Genesis creation narrative, in which Eve is formed from Adam's rib.

Laqueur's argument has been enormously influential on the history of the body in the West, and applied by historians to a range of societies outside Laqueur's original scope, such as medieval Iceland. However, scholars specialising in pre-eighteenth-century history have often been critical of the idea that the one-sex body really was dominant in everyday life, or even in intellectual circles.

=== The Vitruvian Man ===
The Vitruvian Man is a drawing by Leonardo da Vinci that depicts the European ideal of a man. The figure is extremely muscular and focuses on the exterior of the body, what can be seen and felt. This was the standard of beauty of humans and continues to be the ideal body of European traditions. There is no Vitruvian women.

== Medical body in East Asian medical literature ==
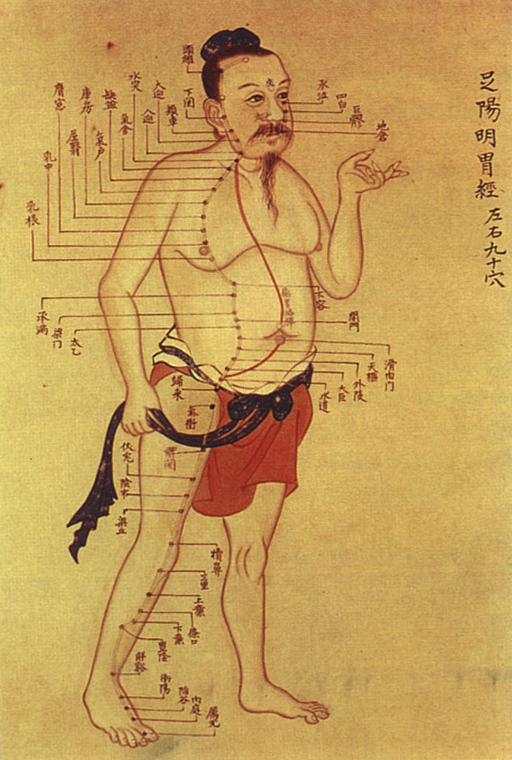
Representation of the body in East Asian Medical Literature. Lines represent areas of the body that connect by energy.

Eastern ideologies of the body explain what can be detected, not only felt and examined. This comes from the idea that there is not only what can be physically seen and touched but what cannot be. Energy or more aptly the means by which your body can manifest itself in the world cannot be seen but, was thought to be able to be detected. Definitions of the body and its disorders therefore focus on physical manifestations of energy through the body. This is mostly seen in Traditional Chinese medicine and has today been explained in physical ways by modern science. The ideal body of east Asian medical literature was not muscular and instead focused on key energy manifestations in the body for directed therapy.

=== Yellow Emperors body ===
The Yellow Emperor's Body is a term derived from the references to the Yellow Emperor within the Ancient Chinese book, the "book of change". The Term describes the references to both the physical body that can be touched, felt, and interact with the physical world, but also the sense of person and self that the body. The dualism of the body as both the physical self and the subjective consciousness is how Chinese defined the body. The Yellow Emperor's body is a metaphor to describe a body that focuses on the individual and not the general, focusing on disorder as not just a physical malady.

The yellow emperor is revered in China and was the founder of acupuncture. The yellow emperor is said to of derived his medical practices from a conversation with a community physician. The manuscript is recorded in the Yellow Emperors Inner Cannon, and it being recorded in this way represents the attention to the individuals perspective in creating therapies like acupuncture to treat body ailments.

The Inner Cannon was revised by natural Philosophers of the time and the approved version of the Han Court and became a foundational text for the ideals and perceptions of the human body. It focused on Qi, Yin and Yang balance, and Five phase theory to explain health can disease.

==== Qi ====
Referred to as the life force of the body, or the means by which the body is able to be animated. Qi is not limited to the physical but is intertwined with the cosmological. A tiny bit of qi, known as primordial qi is integrated in humans at birth. As one grows it is due to the primordial qi, as one fades it is because of the qi, and when one dies it is because their qi has been exhausted.

==== Yin and Yang ====
These are variations and representations of qi that define how a human exists in the world, a system of complementary opposites. Yin and Yang defined gender differences seen in the population. A baby born male simply had more Yang Qi energy where as a female has dominant Yin energy. Transgenderism, hermaphroditism and other variations of the body can be explained by the Yin and Yang Qi ideas of the body much better than the European counterparts.

==== Five Phases ====
Other types of change in the world were classified by Wood, Fire, Earth, Metal and Water. Applied to the body these 5 forces were the Liver, Heart, Spleen, Lung, and Kidney. These representations of the physical world in the body was understood dynamically and represents a deeper connection to the non animate objects and surroundings of a human. The body was not only physical sphere but a cosmological one interconnected to all physical and non physical quantities of life.

=== Disorders - Cheng Congzhou ===
The clinician and patient encounter is a spiritual connection. It is not just about what is done but what is said and how it is said, how information is revealed and what information is not. Cheng Congzhou a physician in 1581 was a local doctor in Yangshou and documented his patient encounters in detail. The importance of not only qi but blood is seen in his records:

Fang Shunian's mother, the scholar's Honored Lady,4 was sixty three years old. Her constitution was naturally weak and emaciated. Her qi and Blood were both depleted. Normally all her six pulses were extremely "subtle" and "fine"; even when she caught cold they did not become very "big" or "pounding."

The interactions of the physical body and the cosmological essence of a body was how disorders of the body was framed in this doctors account.

== The corpse ==
The practices surrounding a corpse differ widely among cultures. Diogenes is famously said to have wanted his lifeless body to be thrown to the wolves so that his body can return to nature. Cultural practices that revere the dead across all cultures reveal that even in European cultures that attempt to adhere purely to what can be seen and touched, recognize that there is a more cosmic necessity to the body and connection to the physical and cosmological worlds.
