= Douglas Gray (literary scholar) =

New Zealand medievalist, editor and author

Douglas Gray, FBA (17 February 1930 – 7 December 2017) was a New Zealand-born literary scholar who was the first J. R. R. Tolkien Professor of English Literature and Language at the University of Oxford and a Professorial Fellow of Lady Margaret Hall, Oxford, both between 1980 and 1997. He began his career as an assistant lecturer at the Victoria University of Wellington (1952–54), where he had graduated in 1952. Gray then studied at Merton College, Oxford, where he gained a BA in 1956. He then lectured at Pembroke College, Oxford, where he was elected to a fellowship in 1961, remaining there until his appointment to the Tolkien chair in 1980; he had also been a university lecturer since 1976. He was elected a Fellow of the British Academy in 1989.

== Publications ==
- Themes and Images in the Medieval English Religious Lyric (Routledge & Kegan Paul, 1972).
- A Selection of Religious Lyrics (Clarendon Press, 1975).
- Robert Henryson, Medieval and Renaissance Authors (E. J. Brill, 1979).
- The Oxford Book of Late Medieval Verse and Prose (Clarendon Press, 1985).
- (Co-authored with J. A. W. Bennett) Middle English Literature: 1100–1400, Oxford History of English Literature series (Clarendon Press, 1986).
- The Oxford Companion to Chaucer (Oxford University Press, 2003).
- Later Medieval English Literature (Oxford University Press, 2008).
- The Phoenix and the Parrot: Skelton and the Language of Satire (University of Otago Press, 2012).
- Simple Forms: Essays on Medieval English Popular Literature (Oxford University Press, 2015).
