= Julia Boffey =

English academic (1952/1953–2026)

Julia Boffey (née Waddleton; 1952 or 1953 – 11 September 2026) was an English academic who was Professor of Medieval Studies at Queen Mary University of London.

== Life and work ==
Boffey studied as an undergraduate at Newnham College, Cambridge, and completed a D.Phil. thesis on medieval verse manuscripts at the Centre for Medieval Studies at York. She was the author of Manuscript and Print in London c.1475 - 1530 (2012) and Manuscripts of English Courtly Love Lyrics in the Later Middle Ages (1985), and editor of Fifteenth-century English Dream Visions: an Anthology (2003). She is also the co-editor (with A. S. G. Edwards) of the New Index of Middle English Verse and A Companion to Fifteenth-Century English Poetry, as well as co-editor with Christiania Whitehead of Middle English Lyrics: New Readings of Short Poems (2018), with V. Davis of Recording Medieval Lives: Proceedings of the 2005 Harlaxton Symposium, and with Pamela King of London and Europe in the Later Middle Ages. She was a Fellow of the Society of Antiquaries of London.

Boffey died on 11 September 2026, aged 73.
