= Marion Turner =

British academic

Professor Marion Turner
- Born: 1976 (age 49–50)
- Title: J. R. R. Tolkien Professor of English Literature and Language
- Awards: Rose Mary Crawshay Prize; for Chaucer: A European Life

Academic background
- Education: University of Oxford (BA, DPhil); University of York (MA)

Academic work
- Discipline: English literature
- Institutions: Magdalen College, Oxford; King's College London; Jesus College, Oxford; Lady Margaret Hall, Oxford
- Main interests: Geoffrey Chaucer
- Notable works: Chaucer: A European Life; The Wife of Bath: A Biography

Marion Turner (born 1976) is the J. R. R. Tolkien Professor of English Literature and Language at the University of Oxford and an academic authority on Geoffrey Chaucer. She has authored several books, including Chaucer: A European Life, which was shortlisted in 2020 for the Wolfson History Prize, and was a finalist in the PROSE Awards, and for which she was awarded the 2020 Rose Mary Crawshay Prize.

== Education ==
Turner is from Northumberland. She received her MA and DPhil from Oxford University and her MA from the University of York. Her doctoral thesis was supervised by Paul H. Strohm, one of her predecessors in the Tolkien Professorship.

== Career ==
Turner has been a research fellow of the Leverhulme Trust, the Wellcome Trust, and the British Academy. She held a Fellowship by Examination at Magdalen College, Oxford and taught at King's College London before being elected to a Tutorial Fellowship at Jesus College, Oxford in 2007. In 2007, she published the book Chaucerian Conflict, and in 2013, edited A Handbook of Middle English Studies. Chaucer: A European Life was published in 2019. Alison Flood writes in The Guardian, "Turner's book is the first full biography of Chaucer for a generation, and the first written by a woman." She was elected the J R R Tolkien Professor of English Literature and Language at the University of Oxford in 2022. Between 2018 and 2022, Turner served as a trustee of the New Chaucer Society.

=== Media appearances ===
In January 2024 Turner appeared in an episode of the BBC Radio 4 series Ian Hislop's Oldest Jokes, discussing Chaucer's Sir Topaz and its role in the popularisation of the parody genre.

== Critical reception ==
=== Chaucer: A European Life ===
Kirkus Reviews describes Chaucer: A European Life, as "A meticulously researched, well-styled academic study" and writes, "Though perhaps too dense for general readers, the book is well-suited to scholars and students of medieval literature." Philip Knox writes for The Review of English Studies, "Her expansive book is written with an unusual mix of erudition, clarity, and wit: it will be required reading for specialists, an invaluable resource for students, and a rich introduction to Chaucer's world for the general reader."

Alastair Minnis writes for The Spenser Review, "Turner's style is her own – lively, vivid, witty and often chatty, dispensing many delightful confections of information by way of contextualising the few hard facts that are known about the poet's life." Tim Smith-Laing describes Turner for The Telegraph as "Stating her belief that Chaucer's "emotional life [...] is beyond the biographer's reach", she disclaims any attempt to reconstruct the person, and opts, via daunting amounts of original research and scholarly legwork, for the more complex and satisfying task of interrogating how it is that personhood emerges from its place in the world."

Steve Donoghue of Open Letters Monthly writes, "Turner is a smooth, engaging writer and an exhaustive one. She obviously cares about keeping her readers interested (and she herself seems raptly interested throughout), but she's likewise unwilling to skirt, condense, or over-simplify, and she has an enormous story to tell." Stephanie Trigg writes for The Sydney Morning Herald, "in the context of contemporary English politics it is hard not to see this as an anti-Brexit biography: one that affirms the complex multicultural and multilingual nature of medieval Europe, and England's participation in many of Europe's cultural and literary traditions." Joe Stadolnik writes for the Los Angeles Review of Books, "The book's deliberate accessibility, and its evocation of a more relatable Chaucer, deserves some praise. But this approach runs a risk, that the same enthusiasm to make Chaucer more accessible will gloss over what makes him uneasily medieval, someone who thought and moved through the world in ways impossibly remote and alien to us."

=== The Wife of Bath: A Biography ===
In a review of The Wife of Bath: A Biography in Literary Review, Carolyne Larrington writes that Turner "has avoided 'second-book syndrome' with a breathtakingly simple idea: a biography of Chaucer's most famous character, Dame Alison (or Alice), [...], better known as the Wife of Bath. Informative, clear-sighted, entertaining and as opinionated as its subject, Turner's new book is a wonderful introduction to the lives of 14th-century women, The Canterbury Tales and the fascinating ways in which Alison has been read and misread".

In The Guardian, Katy Guest writes, "this book is an intriguing combination of the fantastically bawdy and the deadly serious. It contains all the academic throat-clearing you might expect from a dissertation ("In this second half of this biography, I trace … "; "as the rest of this chapter will discuss … "), and all the forensic research, too." A review by Mary Wellesley in The Telegraph gives the book 5 out of 5 stars and states, "Turner's wonderful new "biography" of Alison shows how radical she was in her time, and explains why she has proved so popular across the ages and in novel cultural contexts."

== Books ==
- Chaucerian Conflict: Languages of Antagonism in Late Fourteenth-Century London (OUP, 2007)
- A Handbook of Middle English Studies (Wiley-Blackwell, 2013)
- Chaucer: A European Life (Princeton University Press, 2019)
- The Wife of Bath: A Biography (Princeton University Press, 2023)

== Selected articles in edited books ==
- 'Chaucer' in A Companion to Literary Biography, ed. Richard Bradford (Wiley-Blackwell, 2018)
- 'The Senses,' in A New Companion to Chaucer, ed Peter Brown (Wiley-Blackwell, 2019)
- 'The English Context,' in Chaucer in Context ed. Ian Johnson (Cambridge, CUP, 2019)
- 'Form,' in The Cambridge Companion to the Canterbury Tales, ed. Frank Grady (CUP, 2020)

== Journal articles ==
- '"Certaynly his noble sayenges can I not amende": Thomas Usk and Troilus and Criseyde', Chaucer Review 37:1 (2002): 26-39
- 'Troilus and Criseyde and the Treasonous Aldermen of 1382: Tales of the City in Late Fourteenth Century London', Studies in the Age of Chaucer 25 (2003): 225-57
- 'Usk and the Goldsmiths', New Medieval Literatures 9 (2008): 139-77
- 'Thomas Usk and John Arderne', Chaucer Review 47 (2012): 95-105
- 'Illness Narratives in the Later Middle Ages: Arderne, Chaucer, and Hoccleve,' JMEMS 46:1 (2016): 61-87
- 'Unlocked Doors: Geoffrey Chaucer's Writing-Rooms and Elizabeth Chaucer's Nunnery.' Studies in the Age of Chaucer, 40 (2018): 423-434
- "Stop talking englissh [sic]" (review of Zrinka Stahuljak, Fixers: Agency, Translation and the Early Global History of Literature, Chicago, February 2024, ISBN 978 0 226 83039 1, 345 pp.), London Review of Books, vol. 46, no. 9 (9 May 2024), p. 13. "The 'fixer' is a slippery figure: Stahuljak, who used to work as an interpreter in war zones, uses the term by analogy with the local interpreters-guides-brokers who make it possible for modern journalists to function in alien terrain. She emphasises that the work they do as interpreters – just one of the many ways in which they enable networks of exchange – is more creative than we might assume. Medieval writers, readers and travellers understood translation as a dynamic process, something that has been obscured by the later emphasis on the value of the original text and its author."

== Honours and awards ==
- 2020 Rose Mary Crawshay Prize (Chaucer: A European Life)
- 2020 Wolfson History Prize shortlist (Chaucer: A European Life)
- 2020 PROSE Awards Finalist, Biography & Autobiography (Chaucer: A European Life )
- 2020 Choice Outstanding Academic Titles (Chaucer: A European Life)
- 2021 Gründler Book Prize, Western Michigan University (Chaucer: A European Life)
