= Turold (disambiguation) =

Turold may refer to:

== People ==
- Turold de Pont-Audemer (born c. 950), Norman aristocrat
- Turold on the Bayeux Tapestry, a figure of uncertain identification depicted on the Bayeux Tapestry
- Turoldus, traditional author of the 11th-century French Song of Roland
- Turold of Rochester, Norman knight, landholder in Kent in 1086
- Turold of Fécamp (died 1098), abbot of Malmesbury and abbot of Peterborough
- Turold de Brémoy (died 1146), bishop of Bayeux from 1099 until 1106
- Gilbert fitz Turold, Anglo-Norman landowner
- Richard Fitz Turold, Anglo-Norman landowner
- Walter Turold (Walter Tirel), Anglo-Norman nobleman

== Places ==
- Turold (Mikulov), a hill in the Mikulov Highlands
