= Bayeux Tapestry tituli =

Captions embroidered on the Bayeux Tapestry

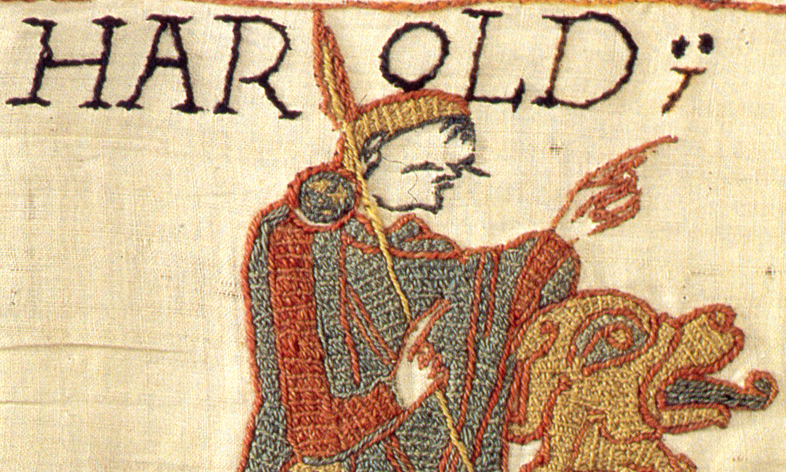
Detail of the embroidered name HAROLD, identifying the figure as Harold Godwinson

The Bayeux Tapestry tituli are Medieval Latin captions embroidered on the Bayeux Tapestry, which describe the 58 scenes portrayed on the tapestry. These help describe the main events depicted, which lead up to the Norman Conquest of England concerning William, Duke of Normandy, and Harold, Earl of Wessex, later King of England, culminating in the Battle of Hastings. The tituli, composed of 2,226 characters and symbols, is the longest known text of its kind.

== The tapestry ==
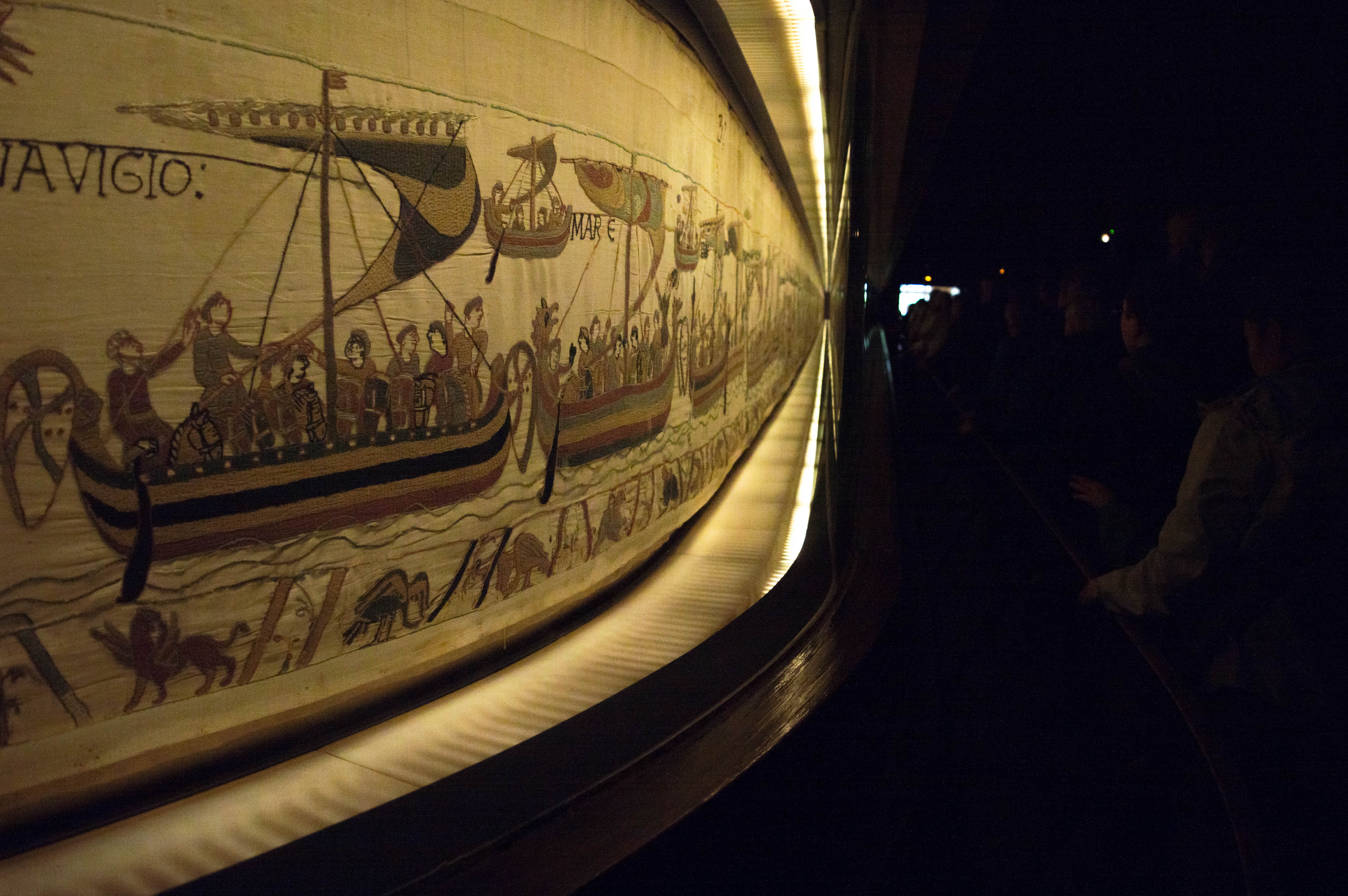
The Bayeux Tapestry in the Musée de la Tapisserie de Bayeux in Bayeux, Normandy, France

The Bayeux Tapestry is a 70-metre (77 yd) long embroidered-linen cloth which narrates the story of the Norman conquest of England in 1066, and has been said to be "one of the most powerful pieces of visual propaganda ever produced, as well as one of the few medieval works of art familiar to almost everyone in the Western world." The tapestry has compelled many people to study and question who commissioned it and for what purpose. The tapestry is usually displayed in the Musée de la Tapisserie de Bayeux in Bayeux, Normandy, France, and is protected by a glass case. The events are depicted in 58 scenes, which lead up to the Norman Conquest of England concerning William, Duke of Normandy, and Harold, Earl of Wessex, later King of England, culminating in the Battle of Hastings.

== Description ==
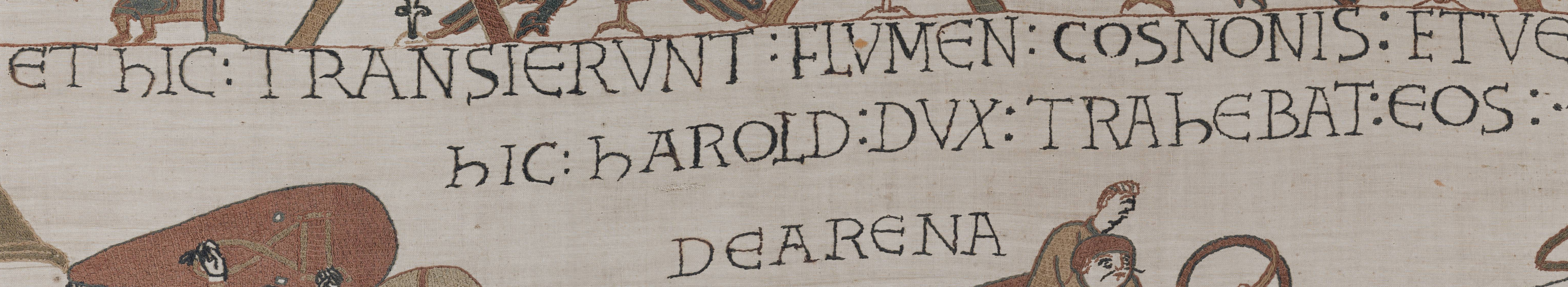
The titulus of scene 17

Many palaeographers who study manuscripts can distinguish different hands within the writings on manuscripts. In the same way, Bayeux Tapestry scholars have argued that there were different "scribes" at work, as there are subtle differences between similar letters along the entire tapestry. For example, at scene 17 the uncial letter Es in the top line of the tituli have elegant serifs with tiny points; while those in the lower two lines have straight bars. In scenes 52 to 57, different techniques and use of colour similarly suggest different writers.

The Bayeux Tapestry was most likely commissioned by William the Conqueror's half-brother, Bishop Odo, possibly at the same time as Bayeux Cathedral's construction in the 1070s, and completed by 1077 in time for display on the cathedral's dedication. It is embroidered in wool yarn on a tabby-woven linen ground using outline or stem stitch for detailing and lettering. A dark blue wool, almost black, is used for most of the tapestry's lettering but towards the end other colours are used, sometimes for each word and other times for each letter.

The content of the hanging is primarily pictorial but tituli are included on many scenes of the action to point out names of people and places or to explain briefly the event being depicted. The text is in Latin (which for the most part is grammatically correct), and is extremely direct, with each statement being closely tied to the scenes depicted in a given section. The text is frequently abbreviated as indicated by tildes placed over words at the place of omission of a letter. The words themselves are often demarcated by two points (which Lucien Musset likens to colons); sometimes, more important section breaks are demarcated by three points. Many personal names, mostly in English, are not Latinised and the same applies for names of places in England and for Beaurain "Belrem" in France. In places the spelling shows an English influence, such as the phrase "at Hestenga ceastra", which in proper Latin would be "ad Hastingae castra". Some French names are either archaic ("Rednes") or anglicised ("Bagias"). Sometimes "Franci" is used to describe the Normans and the rest of the host.

The end of the tapestry has been missing from time immemorial and the final titulus "Et fuga verterunt Angli" is said by Lucien Musset to be "entirely spurious", added shortly before 1814 at a time of anti-English sentiment. The first word on the tapestry "Edward" is also a restoration.

== Notable scenes ==
=== Scene 12 ===
Scene 12 is a notable scene studied because of its tituli. It appears as though "a different writer took over the inscription at this point and saw himself as beginning here; or that the same scribe began a new stint of work here." The upper border has dipped at this point and the birds and beasts depicted in it are large. "The tituli is accordingly forced into smaller letters and is very intermittent, being fitted in round a tree, a sword, hands, spears, and birds' heads. It seems likely that the first workshop completed the main register and the upper border, leaving the inscription (and possibly the lower border) incomplete."

=== Scenes 29 and 30 ===
Another notable event occurs in scenes 29 and 30, depicting the coronation of Harold as king. In this scene, Harold is seated on the throne, with nobles to his left and Archbishop Stigand to his right. The tituli states, "Here they gave the king's crown to Harold" in scene 29, and "Here sits Harold King of the English" in scene 30. The coronation of King Harold is important because as the masses are cheering for Harold, Halley's Comet appears in the sky. This scene also includes a fleet of ships in the lower border, which foreshadows the Norman invasion and the English defeat at the hands of William the Conqueror.

=== Scene 57 ===
The most famous scene within the Bayeux Tapestry is scene 57, depicting Harold's death. In this scene, the tituli states, "HIC HAROLD REX INTERFECTUS EST" which can be translated to "Here King Harold was slain." Harold's death marks the end of the Anglo-Saxon era in England and births the beginning of Norman rule. Harold appears to be plucking an arrow from his eye in the scene. According to many historians, The Bayeux Tapestry is considered one of the earliest and most convincing pieces of evidence that Harold was killed by an arrow. Scene 57 also holds evidence that there was more than one "writer". Scene 52, within the first new titulus after the sixth seam, the colours change to black and yellow with intermittent red letters. They continue, mostly in letters of alternating colour, until Scene 57, Harold's death. At this point green is introduced to the inscription and there are some words in black, some in the lighter greenish shade, to the present limit of the Tapestry. "The change of colour at Scene 57 may, again, relate to a different production team: The episode of Harold's death also contains a seam, the eighth, although it is invisible from the front of the Tapestry."

== Latin text with English translation ==
The English translation provided here is of a literal nature, to reflect the simplicity of the captions themselves. The numbering scheme uses the scene numbers on the tapestry's backing cloth, which were added sometime around 1800.

Scene	Text (Note: Letters in square brackets are omitted on the tapestry either by way of abbreviation or where they are implied by a macron diacritic on the previous letter.)	Translation	Image
1	EDWARD[US] (Note: The Bayeux Tapestry scholar Lucien Musset argues that "Edward" is anachronistic (as his name is spelled elsewhere on the tapestry as "Eadwardus") and that it was almost certainly added by restorers, given that the name is missing in 18th century copies.) REX	King Edward	
2-3	UBI HAROLD DUX ANGLORUM ET SUI MILITES EQUITANT AD BOSHAM ECCLESIA[M]	Where Harold, a leader of the English, and his knights ride to Bosham Church	
4	HIC HAROLD MARE NAVIGAVIT	Here Harold sailed by sea	
5	ET VELIS VENTO PLENIS VENIT IN TERRA WIDONIS COMITIS	and with sails filled with wind came to the land of Count Wido (Note: Wido is Guido or Guy, count of Ponthieu.)	
6	HAROLD	Harold	
7	HIC APPREHENDIT WIDO HAROLDU[M]	Here Wido seized Harold	
8	ET DUXIT EUM AD BELREM ET IBI EUM TENUIT	and led him to Beaurain and held him there	
9	UBI HAROLD ⁊ (Note: This symbol, resembling a right-angled 7, is a Tironian note abbreviation for et ("and").) WIDO PARABOLANT	Where Harold and Wido confer	
10	UBI NUNTII WILLELMI DUCIS VENERUNT AD WIDONE[M]	Where the messengers of Duke William came to Wido	
10	TUROLD	Turold (Note: Possibly a member of either Duke William's or Bishop Odo's entourage.)	
11	NUNTII WILLELMI	The messengers of William	
12	† HIC VENIT NUNTIUS AD WILGELMUM DUCEM	† (Note: The significance of the cross is discussed by Norton.) Here the messenger comes to Duke William	
13	HIC WIDO ADDUXIT HAROLDUM AD WILGELMUM NORMANNORUM DUCEM	Here Wido led Harold to William Duke of the Normans	
14	HIC DUX WILGELM[US] CUM HAROLDO VENIT AD PALATIU[M] SUU[M]	Here Duke William comes with Harold to his palace	
15	UBI UNUS CLERICUS ET ÆLFGYVA [...]	Where a cleric and Ælfgyva (...) (Note: A verb is missing, which makes this image the greatest mystery in the Tapestry. The historian D. C. Douglas commented as follows: "The similarity of attitude between the clerk and the semi-obscene figure in the lower margin will not escape notice, nor will the absence of a verb in the legend. Perhaps the dovecot and the doves in the upper border have an erotic significance, and the whole episode may possibly refer to some scandal, then notorious, but now advantageously forgotten". Theories on the woman and her relationship with the cleric abound, ranging from being an embroidress to receiving anger, lewdness or affection on part of the clergyman.)	
16	HIC WILLEM[US] DUX ET EXERCITUS EIUS VENERUNT AD MONTE[M] MICHAELIS	Here Duke William and his army came to the Mount of Michael	
17	ET HIC TRANSIERUNT FLUMEN COSNONIS	and here they crossed the river Couesnon	
17	HIC HAROLD DUX TRAHEBAT EOS DE ARENA	Here Duke Harold dragged them from the sand	
18	ET VENERUNT AD DOL ET CONAN FUGA VERTIT	and they came to Dol and Conan turned in flight	
18	REDNES	Rennes	
19	HIC MILITES WILLELMI DUCIS PUGNANT CONTRA DINANTES	Here the knights of Duke William fight against the men of Dinan	
20	ET CUNAN CLAVES PORREXIT	and Conan passed out the keys	
21	HIC WILLELM[US] DEDIT ARMA HAROLDO	Here William gave arms to Harold	
22	HIE [sic] (Note: This word is a misspelling of the demonstrative pronoun hic.) WILLELM[US] VENIT BAGIAS	Here William came to Bayeux	
23	UBI HAROLD SACRAMENTUM FECIT WILLELMO DUCI	Where Harold made an oath to Duke William	
24	HIC HAROLD DUX REVERSUS EST AD ANGLICAM TERRAM	Here Duke Harold returned to English land	
25	ET VENIT AD EDWARDU[M] REGEM	and he came to King Edward	
26	HIC PORTATUR CORPUS EADWARDI REGIS AD ECCLESIAM S[AN]C[T]I PETRI AP[OSTO]LI	Here the body of King Edward is carried to the Church of Saint Peter the Apostle (Note: I.e. Westminster Abbey.)	
27	HIC EADWARDUS REX IN LECTO ALLOQUIT[UR] FIDELES	Here King Edward in bed speaks to his faithful followers	
28	ET HIC DEFUNCTUS EST	and here he died	
29	HIC DEDERUNT HAROLDO CORONA[M] REGIS	Here they gave the king's crown to Harold	
30	HIC RESIDET HAROLD REX ANGLORUM	Here sits Harold King of the English	
31	STIGANT ARCHIEP[ISCOPU]S	Archbishop Stigand	
32	ISTI MIRANT[UR] STELLA[M]	These people marvel at the star (Note: I.e. Halley's Comet.)	
33	HAROLD	Harold	
34	HIC NAVIS ANGLICA VENIT IN TERRAM WILLELMI DUCIS	Here an English ship came to the land of Duke William	
35	HIC WILLELM[US] DUX JUSSIT NAVES [A]EDIFICARE	Here Duke William ordered ships to be built	
36	HIC TRAHUNT NAVES AD MARE	Here they drag the ships to the sea	
37	ISTI PORTANT ARMAS AD NAVES ET HIC TRAHUNT CARRUM CUM VINO ET ARMIS	These men carry arms to the ships and here they drag a cart (laden) with wine and arms	
38	† HIC WILLELM[US] DUX IN MAGNO NAVIGIO MARE TRANSIVIT ET VENIT AD PEVENESÆ	† Here Duke William in a great ship crossed the sea and came to Pevensey	
39	HIC EXEUNT CABALLI DE NAVIBUS	Here the horses leave the ships	
40	ET HIC MILITES FESTINAVERUNT HESTINGA UT CIBUM RAPERENTUR	and here the knights have hurried to Hastings to seize food	
41	HIC EST WADARD	Here is Wadard (Note: A vassal of Bishop Odo.)	
42	HIC COQUITUR CARO ET HIC MINISTRAVERUNT MINISTRI	Here the meat is being cooked and here the servants have served (it)	
43	HIC FECERUN[T] PRANDIUM	Here they have a meal	
43	ET HIC EPISCOPUS CIBU[M] ET POTU[M] BENEDICIT	And here the bishop blesses the food and drink	
44	ODO EP[ISCOPU]S WILLELM[US] ROTBERT	Bishop Odo, William, Robert	
45	ISTE JUSSIT UT FODERETUR CASTELLUM AT HESTENGA (Note: The spelling of the Latin word ad here has been cited by some in favour of the theory that the Tapestry was made in England.)	He ordered that a motte should be dug at Hastings	
45	CEASTRA (Note: The spelling of the Latin word castra here has been cited by some in favour of the theory that the Tapestry was made in England.)	the camp	
46	HIC NUNTIATUM EST WILLELM[O] DE HAROLD[O]	Here William was told about Harold	
47	HIC DOMUS INCENDITUR	Here a house is burned	
48	HIC MILITES EXIERUNT DE HESTENGA ET VENERUNT AD PR[O]ELIUM CONTRA HAROLDUM REGE[M]	Here the knights have left Hastings and have come to the battle against King Harold	
49	HIC WILLELM[US] DUX INTERROGAT VITAL[EM] SI VIDISSET HAROLDI EXERCITU[M]	Here Duke William asks Vital (Note: Possibly a vassal of Bishop Odo.) if he has seen Harold's army	
50	ISTE NUNTIAT HAROLDUM REGE[M] DE EXERCITU WILLELMI DUCIS	This messenger tells King Harold about Duke William's army	
51	HIC WILLELM[US] DUX ALLOQUITUR SUIS MILITIBUS UT PREPARAREN[T] SE VIRILITER ET SAPIENTER AD PR[O]ELIUM CONTRA ANGLORUM EXERCITU[M]	Here Duke William speaks to (Note: Or "harangues".) his knights to prepare themselves manfully and wisely for the battle against the army of the English	
52	HIC CECIDERUNT LEWINE ET GYRÐ FRATRES HAROLDI REGIS	Here fell Leofwine and Gyrth, brothers of King Harold	
53	HIC CECIDERUNT SIMUL ANGLI ET FRANCI IN PR[O]ELIO	Here English and French fell at the same time in battle	
54	HIC ODO EP[ISCOPU]S BACULU[M] TENENS CONFORTAT PUEROS	Here Bishop Odo, holding a club, gives strength to the boys	
55	HIC EST WILLEL[MUS] DUX	Here is Duke William	
56	E[USTA]TIUS	Eustace	
56	HIC FRANCI PUGNANT ET CECIDERUNT QUI ERANT CUM HAROLDO	Here the French do battle and those who were with Harold fell	
57	HIC HAROLD REX INTERFECTUS EST	Here King Harold was slain	
58	ET FUGA VERTERUNT ANGLI (Note: This caption was missing in 18th century copies. Musset refers to this line as "entirely spurious" and the result of "heavy-handed restoration".)	and the English have turned in flight	
