= George Digby =

George Digby may refer to:

- George Digby, 2nd Earl of Bristol (1612–1677), English politician
- George Digby (baseball scout) (1917–2014), American scout and consultant in Major League Baseball
- George Wingfield Digby (died 1989), British textile historian

== See also ==
- George Digby Barker (1833–1914), British soldier and colonial administrator
- George Digby Morant (1837–1921), British admiral
