= Thorold (disambiguation) =

Thorold is a city in Ontario, Canada.

Thorold may also refer to:

- Anthony Wilson Thorold (1825–1895), Anglican bishop of Rochester, later bishop of Winchester
- Anthony Thorold (MP) (c.1520–1594), English lawyer and politician
- William Thorold (engineer) (1798–1878), English millwright, architect and civil engineer
- Thorold Dickinson (1903-1984), British film director and academic
- Turold de Pont-Audemer (c. 950-1040), also called Thorold, Norman aristocrat
- Thorold baronets, four baronetcies in England and Great Britain
- Thorold's deer (Cervus albirostris)

== See also ==
- Turold (disambiguation)
