= Turoldus =

Turoldus, or Turoldulus, is the name traditionally given to the author of the 11th-century French poem the Song of Roland. Efforts to make a convincing further identification of the identity of Turoldus have failed. The Latin form Turoldus is equivalent to the personal name Thorold.

The Bodleian Library manuscript of The Song of Roland, deemed the oldest, ends with the name Turoldus, but the preceding phrase is ambiguous and does not safely allow the interpretation that the role of Turoldus was that of author. The abbot and the bishop of that name, at the end of the 11th century, respectively, in Peterborough and Bayeux, can by no means be tied to the work. The caption "Turold" occurring in the Bayeux Tapestry similarly has given no traction on the identification.
