= Sandra Sawatzky =

Canadian embroidery artist

- Born: Saskatoon
- Education: Alberta University of the Arts, Southern Alberta Institute of Technology
- Website: www.theblackgoldtapestry.com

Sandra M. Sawatzky is a Canadian filmmaker and textile artist. She has made five short films and a feature film. Sawatzky's embroidered art includes The Black Gold Tapestry, which depicts the history of oil on 220 feet of linen, and the Age of Uncertainty, a series of twelve panels depicting modern anxieties. Sawatzky was awarded the Doug & Lois Mitchell Outstanding Calgary Artist Award in November 2022.

== Life ==
Sawatzky was born in Saskatoon. She moved to Calgary to study illustration at the Alberta College of Art and Design (now Alberta University of the Arts). She trained as a filmmaker at the Southern Alberta Institute of Technology. Sawatzky made five short films on dance, and a 2004 feature film The Girl Who Married a Ghost, which adapted a myth belonging to the Nisquali Tribe, telling the story through dance. Sawatzky also taught fashion and the history of textiles at a fashion college during the 1980s.

awake

== The Black Gold Tapestry ==
Sawatzky was inspired to create a tapestry on the subject of oil after a visit to an exhibition of embroidery by pioneer women at the Glenbow Museum in Calgary in 2007. The Black Gold Tapestry is a constructed from eight linen panels with silk and wool thread. It is more than 220 ft (60 m) long, and is modeled on the Bayeux Tapestry, incorporating text and images between upper and lower borders of dinosaurs. It took Sawatzky almost ten years to complete, using the same stitches as the Bayeux Tapestry. Sawatzky describes her work as "film on cloth", saying "it too has a lot of movement and humour". The panels depict the story of oil over 5000 years from the Jurassic and Mesozoic eras, through the Neanderthals and ancient Mesopotamians using bitumen and oil as glue, and Chinese use of gas in salt extraction, through to modern day developments such as efforts to reduce greenhouse gas emissions. Panels depict the use of Greek fire, William Perkin's discovery of mauve dye, and the loss of life during the Deepwater Horizon oil disaster.

The tapestry was first shown with a seven-month exhibition at the Glenbow Museum, in Calgary for the Canadian confederation's 150th anniversary in 2017. In 2018, a panel was exhibited at the Canadian High Commission in London. The tapestry was included as part of the exhibition If the Sky Were Orange, at the Blanton Museum of Art at the University of Texas in 2023. Curator Jeff Goodell described the tapestry as "...a wonderful piece. It uses an ancient and very traditional medium, very reminiscent of the Renaissance, to tell the story of the evolution of oil. It’s really lovely in that it’s a kind of storytelling about the long human history and connection around energy". Writer Amitav Ghosh reflected on the piece, saying it "creates a genealogy for humanity’s present predicament by placing it within history".

From June to December 2024 the tapestry was part of the exhibition Displacement at the MassArt Art Museum in Boston. In February to May 2025 it was part of the group exhibition Threads of Change at the Museum of Design in Atlanta Georgia.

== Age of Uncertainty ==
Age of Uncertainty is a work of twelve embroidered panels by Sawatzky. Sawatzky describes it as depicting "twelve issues that keep us up at night", such as debt, AI, corruption and climate change. The panels are inspired by the illustrations from medieval manuscripts such as Books of Hours, and depict modern day scenes alongside quotes. Sawatzky received a Canada Council grant to complete the work. Age of Uncertainty was shown at the University of Calgary’s Nickle Galleries from January to Mary 2022, the Grand Forks Art Gallery in 2023, and the Red Deer Museum and Art Gallery in Alberta from 6 December 2024 to 8 March 2025.

== Award ==
Sawatzky was awarded the Doug & Lois Mitchell Outstanding Calgary Artist Award at the Cultural Leaders Legacy Arts Awards in November 2022.
