= Game of Thrones Tapestry =

Embroidered tapestry

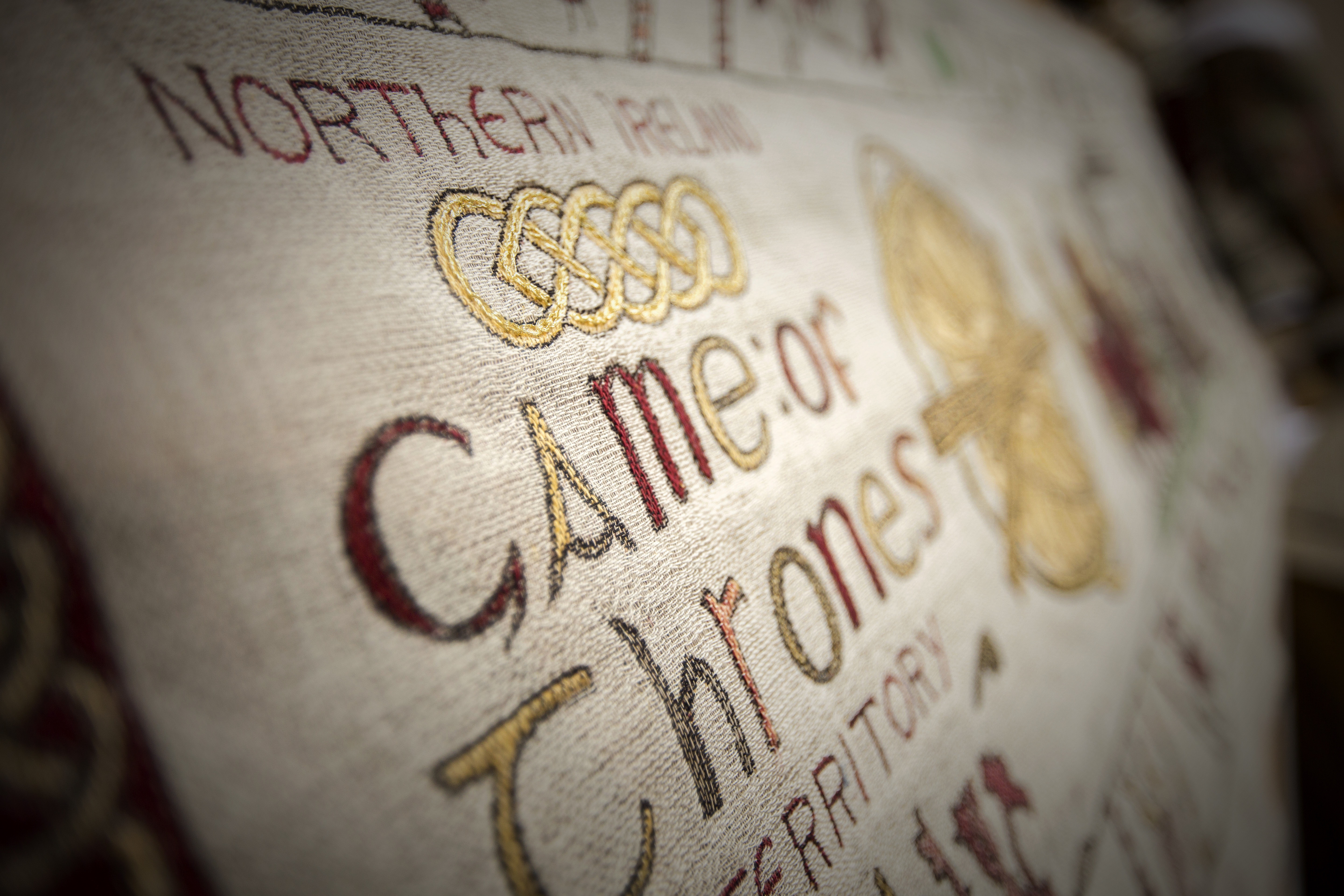
- Year: July 2017
- Completion date: September 2017
- Dimensions: 70 cm × 8210 cm (28 in × 3,230 in)
- Location: Ulster Museum Belfast
- Website: https://www.ireland.com/en-gb/features/game-of-thrones-tapestry/

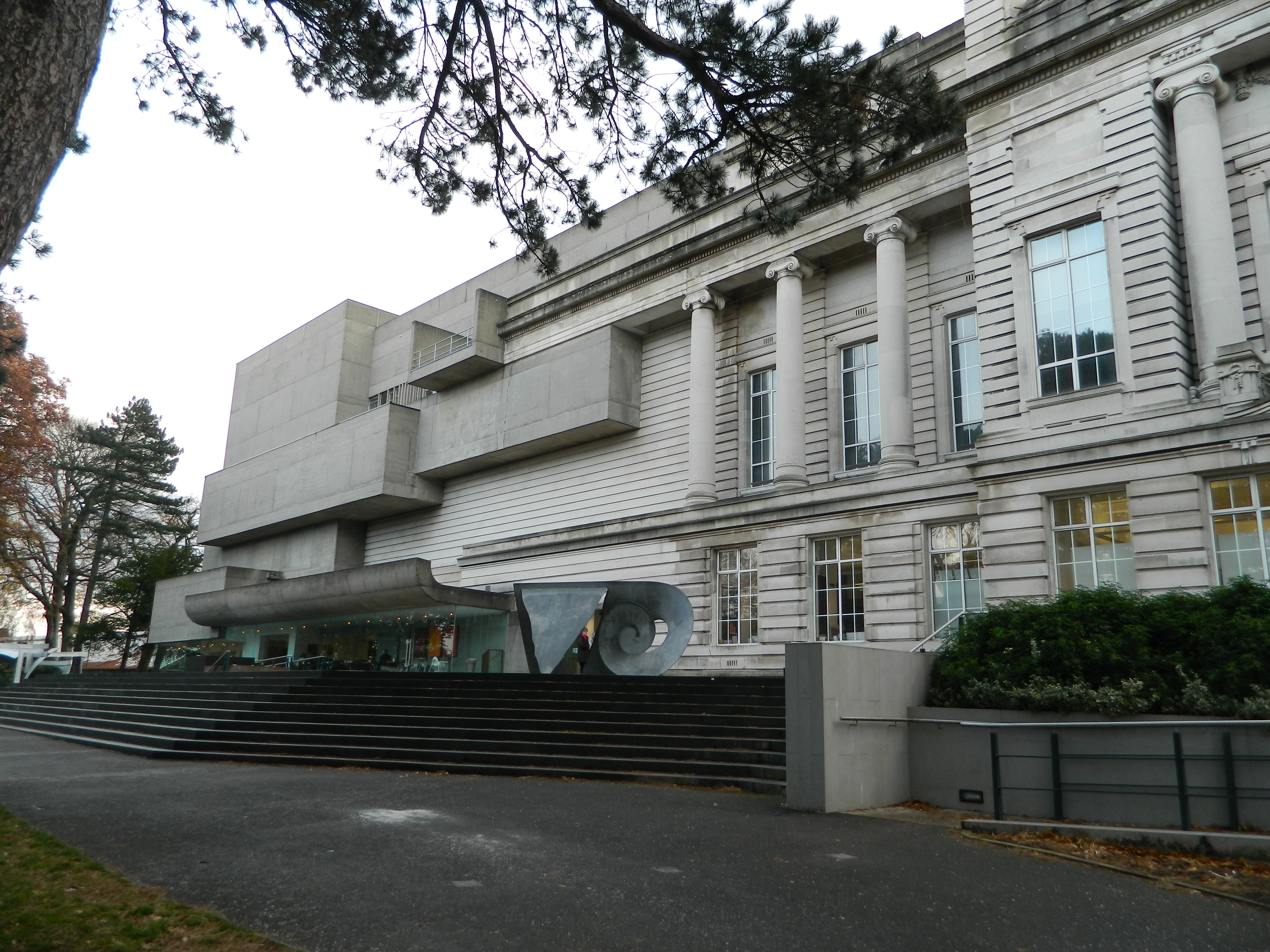
Ulster Museum

Weekly tapestry lengths
| Season . Episode | Length (m) | Total length (m) | Total length (ft) |
|---|---|---|---|
| 1 | 10.70 | 10.70 | 35.10 |
| 2 | 10.63 | 21.33 | 69.89 |
| 3 | 10.75 | 32.08 | 105.25 |
| 4 | 11.40 | 43.48 | 142.65 |
| 5 | 11.64 | 55.12 | 180.84 |
| 6 | 11.30 | 66.42 | 217.91 |
| 7.1 | 1.70 | 68.12 | 223.49 |
| 7.2 | 1.50 | 69.62 | 228.41 |
| 7.3 | 1.47 | 71.09 | 223.23 |
| 7.4 | 1.53 | 72.62 | 238.25 |
| 7.5 | 1.53 | 74.15 | 243.27 |
| 7.6 | 1.57 | 75.72 | 248.43 |
| 7.7 | 2.23 | 77.95 | 255.74 |

The Game of Thrones Tapestry is a hand-crafted tapestry, woven by hand on a jacquard loom, with additional embroidery. The tapestry tells the entire story of the television show, Game of Thrones. It consists of seven 11-metre-long panels and one 10.5-metre panel. The eight panels depict scenes from each episode and include images of crew at work. The tapestry was commissioned by HBO and Tourism Ireland, the tourism bureau of Northern Ireland where HBO filmed much of the series.

It was put on view to the public on 21 July 2017 at the Ulster Museum in Belfast, Northern Ireland. In 2018, it was 66 m (217 ft) long, It was completed in July 2019, and, at 90 m (295 ft), is longer than its inspiration, the 70-metre-long Bayeux Tapestry.

The finished tapestry was displayed at the Bayeux Museum in Bayeux, Normandy, France, from 13 September to 31 December 2019. At the time, the New York Post reported: “Irish officials hope the Bayeux exhibit will boost tourism to Northern Ireland. Its Game of Thrones sites are already a big draw, attracting 350,000 visitors in 2018 alone.”

== Background ==
The tapestry celebrates the legacy of the linen and textile industry of Northern Ireland, historically one of the largest in the world. At the end of the 19th century, it is estimated that over 100,000 people in the north of Ireland were employed in the manufacture and decoration of linen.

Today, the Irish linen and textile industry is much smaller, whereas a growing number of the Northern Irish have found direct or indirect employment in the Game of Thrones tourism industry.

Publicis London, the advertising agency, generated this campaign to help a global audience understand this shift in employment.

The tapestry was made from material which represents that of the late 18th century (linen) and a technique passed on from generations (embroidery). The tapestry was hand-embroidered by some of the last few people remaining in the industry in Northern Ireland.

== Game of Thrones illustrated ==
Many iconic scenes from Game of Thrones are portrayed in the traditional illustrative style of medieval tapestry. Some garments worn in the show were supplied by the Irish textile trade, and the tapestry contains some of these same yarns. Yarns were supplied by Thomas Ferguson and Co. Ltd of Banbridge in association with the Irish Linen Guild.

Publicis London worked closely with HBO to ensure that all characters were true to their appearances on the show and to their roles during particular scenes.

The Game of Thrones Tapestry Website was launched in July 2017. Viewers can scroll the entire length of the tapestry and zoom in to see each individual stitch. The website was updated as each new section was created. The site carefully plots the filming locations (Castle Ward, Shillanavogy Valley, Inch Abbey, Dark Hedges, Downhill Strand, Ballintoy Harbour, Cushendun Caves, Audley's Field, Pollnagollum cave) famous to Northern Ireland and presents further key facts within the show and each location.

== Creative process ==
=== Creative design ===
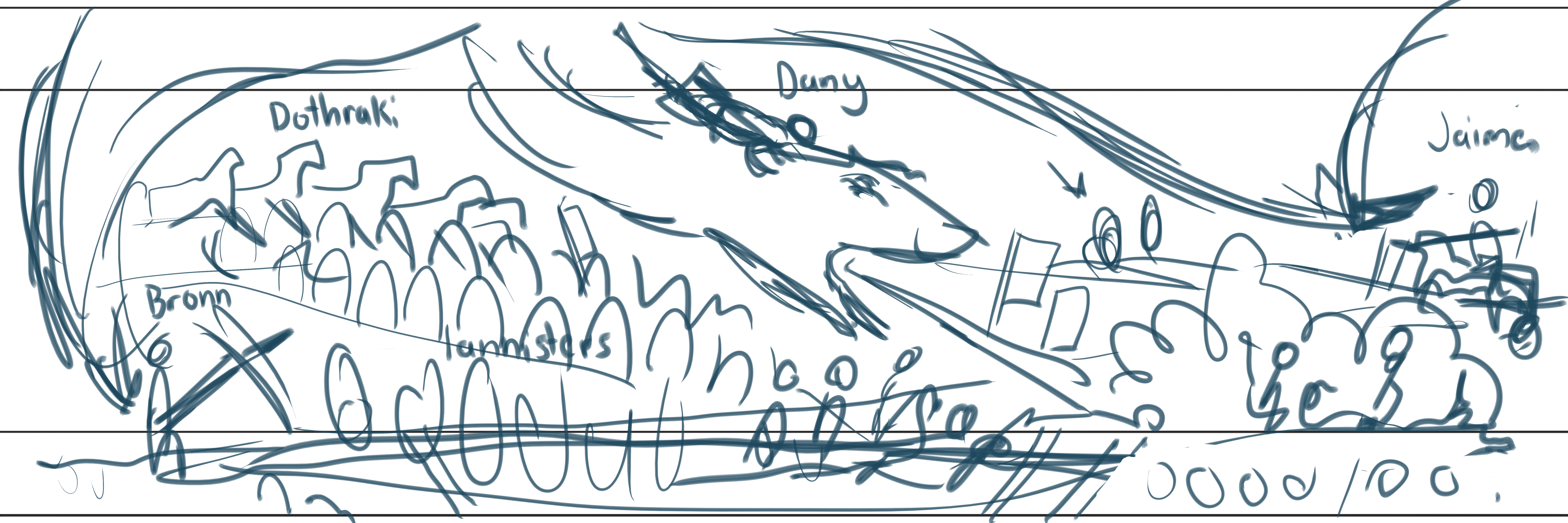
Season 7 Episode 4 – rough sketch

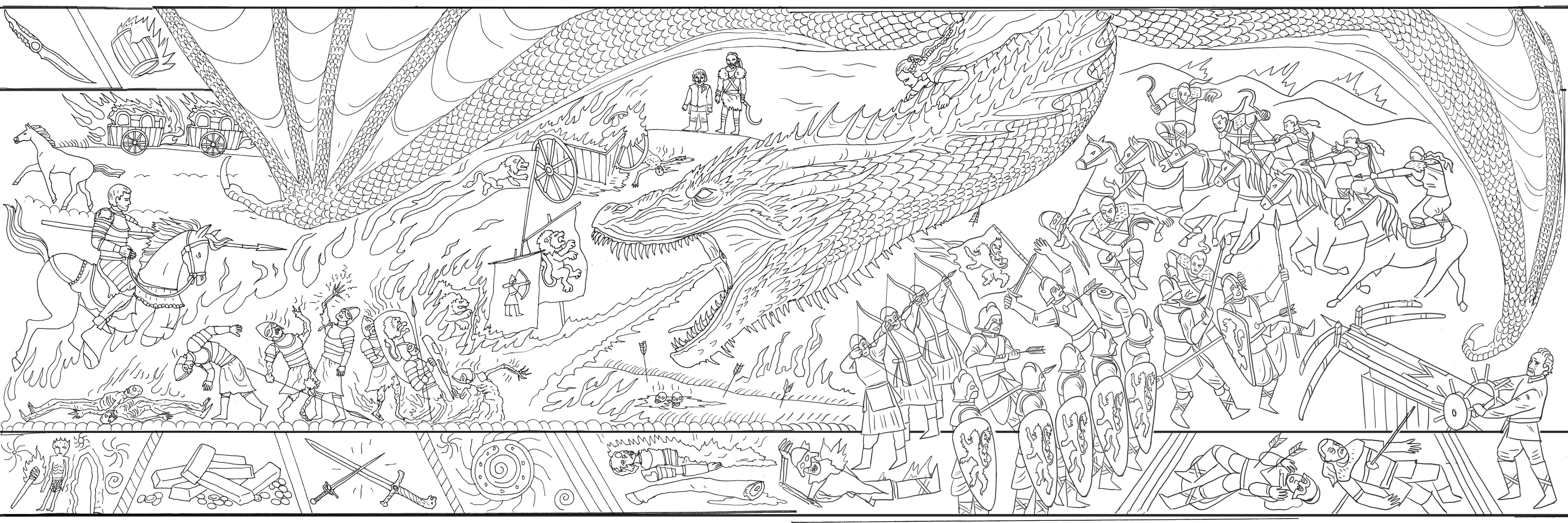
Season 7 Episode 4 – outline

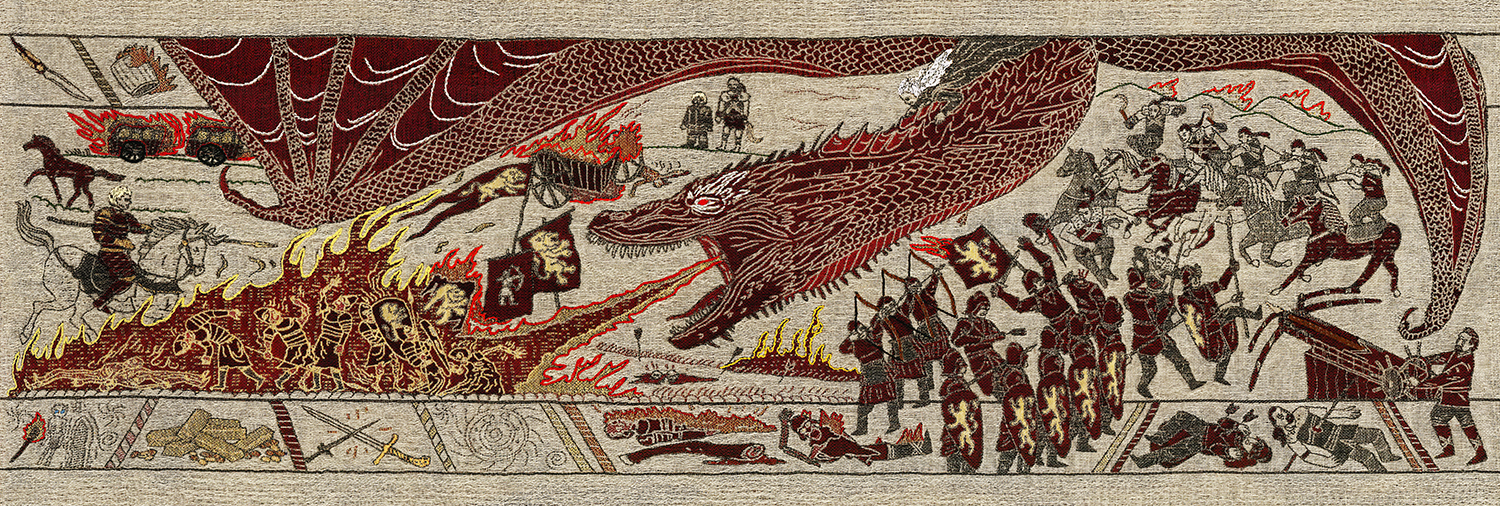
Season 7 Episode 4 – woven / Embroidered scan

Publicis London employed a group of illustrators from Jelly London, an animation/illustration studio in London. The illustrators started by creating outline sketches using both pen and paper and digital touch screens. Sketches were in black and white, with the aim of identifying the correct style, tone of voice, scale and detail, for approval by HBO and Tourism Ireland. Once approved, the line drawings passed through a colourisation phase, a lengthy process of converting the monochrome designs into coloured pieces of illustrated artwork. This process considered line widths, contrasts and resolution, and identified the correct colour palette to use for each section.

=== Weaving ===
The illustrated artwork was then passed to hand-weaving specialists. The artists at Dash & Miller started the weaving process by setting up their loom to the required specification. Several tests were carried out during the early stages of the campaign to determine the design density and range of colours possible. A specialist software was used to help translate the artwork into a format readable by the loom. Once programmed, the team at Dash & Miller began weaving, using the colour palettes instructed by the loom. The average speed of weaving was 4 hours per metre. To capture the weekly episodes, a camera was installed above the loom: it was set to take regular shots during the weaving process, which were then stitched together to create a weekly time-lapse.

=== Embroidery ===
Once woven, the 11-metre section of tapestry was shipped to Belfast to be embroidered. This was done at the Ulster Folk and Transport Museum, near Holywood, County Down. Key areas on the tapestry were selected to be embroidered by a team of 30 stitchers working in groups of 6 and 9 at a time. The team included six staff from the museum. The work also relied heavily on the help of volunteers drawn from textiles guilds, including the Northern Ireland Lace Guild, the Patchwork Guild, and the Embroidery Guild. Stitching was undertaken on a daily basis for over three weeks. The volunteers ranged from a recent textiles graduate in her mid-twenties to an 82-year-old with a background in the garment stitching industry.

== Loom setup and programming ==
=== Machine set-up and weaving ===
The jacquard loom used for weaving the tapestry was a hand-operated TC2 weaving loom from Digital Weaving Norway. This loom was the latest technology in hand-woven jacquard design and allows the hand-weaver to create intricate and complex patterns by hand.

The black and white cotton warp threads first had to be wound onto the loom. This was done in 64m lengths, and the threads were wound onto the back beam of the loom. The warp had 60 threads per inch and was approximately 20 inches wide. Each thread needed to be threaded through a heddle in the middle of the loom, and then through the reed at the front of the loom. This threading process was done by hand using a threading hook. Once the machine was threaded up, the warp threads were secured at the front of the loom onto the front beam. The loom then had to be calibrated to advance the warp threads at the correct speed to weave 84 threads per inch.

To begin the weaving process, Dash & Miller wove 1 or 2 inches of plain weave at the beginning of the warp. This spaced out the warp threads properly and evened out any tension issues. They then began weaving the tapestry, passing the 3 colours of thread by hand through the shed created by lifting the warp threads up and down. The computer controlled which threads were lifted up and down, but the weft yarns were passed through the shed by hand. Weaving built up at a rate of approximately 11 inches per hour, and the weaving was stored on the cloth storage beam at the front of the weaving loom.

Once the weaving was completed, another 1 or 2 inch plain weave border was added before the weaving was cut off the loom, ensuring the warp threads were still threaded so they could be tied on to begin the process again for the next panel.

=== CAD design and colour palettes ===
Using specialist weaving software from Pointcarre, the illustrators' artwork first had to be calibrated for the jacquard loom, taking into consideration the weave construction and warp and weft yarns. The warp yarns were 2/30NE Cotton in black and white end-on-end, and the weft yarns were 1/10NM Flax and Linen.

The fabric comprised combinations of double-cloth and double-faced satins and sateen structures over 4 ends. The combinations of 3/1 and 1/3 satin structures, together with blending of warp and weft colours, allowed the creation of different shades within a spectrum to bring depth and intricacy to the weave.

The illustrators' artwork was converted into a weave file by first defining the colours within the 4 colour palettes. The weave used three weft colours, split into colour palette in the following way:

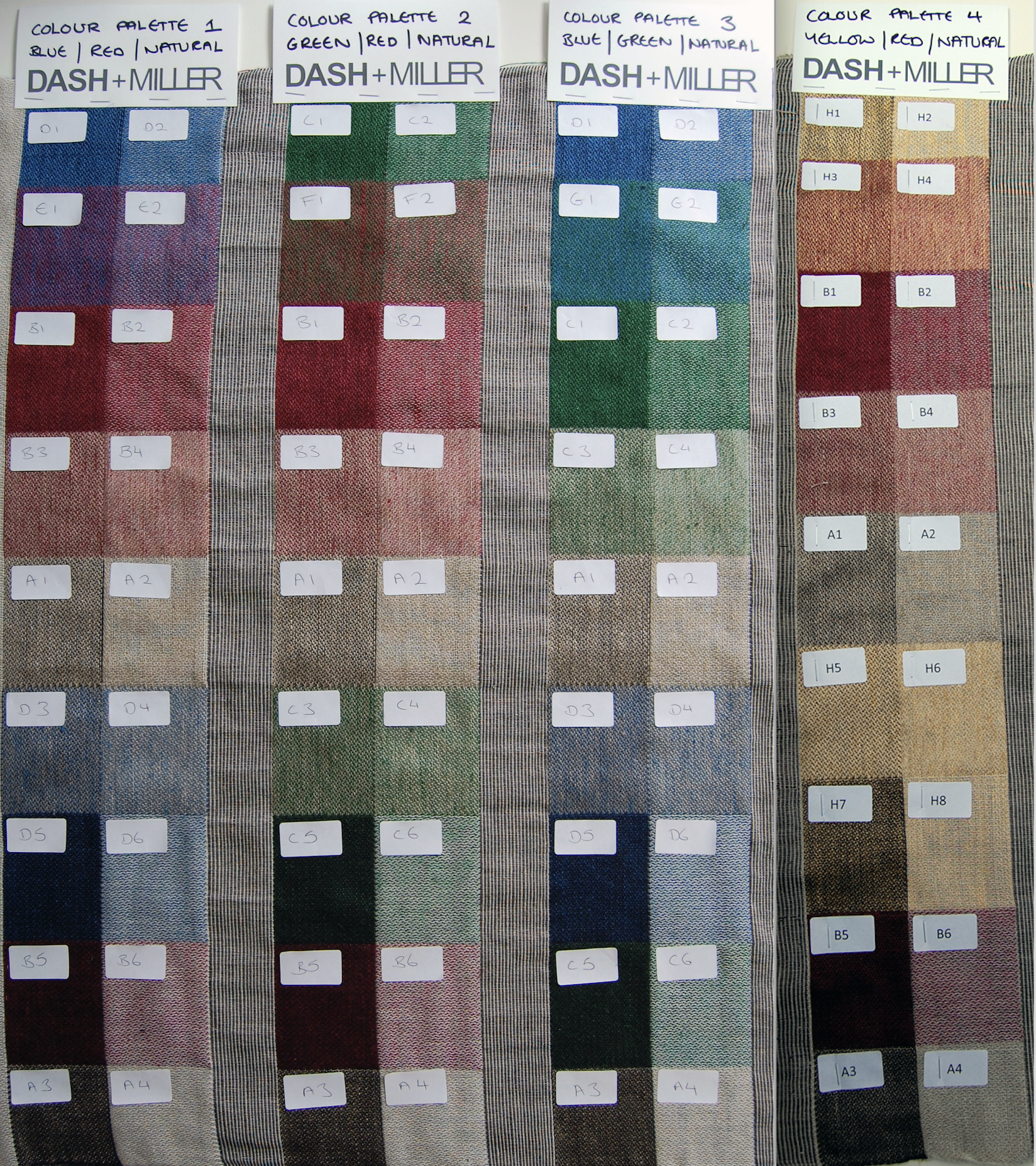
Tapestry colour palette

- Colour palette 1: Natural Linen, Red and Blue Flax
- Colour palette 2: Natural Linen, Red and Green Flax
- Colour palette 3: Natural Linen, Green and Blue Flax
- Colour palette 4: Natural Linen, Red and Yellow Flax

During the weaving process Dash & Miller blended three colours together in the weft, and the illustrators marked which sections of the design should be woven in each colour palette. They then manually switched between colour palettes during the weaving process.

The weave had 84 threads per cm in the weft, and to ensure the scale remained true to the designs the artwork had to be stretched and rotated. The CAD was stretched by 140% to allow the weaving to come out at the same scale as the original illustrators artwork. The artwork was rotated by 90 degrees counter-clockwise so that the piece can be woven as a continuous length on the loom.

Once the artwork was scaled and the colours defined, Dash & Miller allocated weave structures to each colour in the CAD using Pointcarre Jacquard software. Each colour within the four colour palettes had its own weave structure. Dash & Miller also added borders and selvedge to the weave to ensure clean edges to the design. Once the weave file was generated, the computer was able to read the pattern to begin hand-weaving.

== Thomas Fergusons Irish Linen ==
Fergusons was first established in Banbridge, County Down, for the hand-weaving of linen fabric. In 1867 the firm introduced power driven jacquard looms for the weaving of linen damask. John England (Banbridge) Ltd, since 2015 a sister company of Fergusons, regularly supplies fabrics for major theatrical and film productions, including Game of Thrones.

== Jacquard looms ==
The loom used to create the panels is a small modern version of that developed by Frenchman Joseph Marie Jacquard, the son of a Lyonnais silk weaver, in 1804. His development was based on earlier work by fellow Frenchmen Basile Bouchon in 1725, Jean Baptiste Falcon in 1728, and Jacques de Vaucanson in 1741. A jacquard loom is one in which a series of punched cards each corresponds to a row of the design to be woven, allowing for a greater definition of motifs. The punched cards operate a mechanism attached to the loom, controlling the pick-up of weft threads as the design evolves. In the case of the Game of Thrones Tapestry, it allowed the weavers to introduce a rich palette of colours and considerable level of detail throughout the work.
