= Wadard =

Anglo-Norman nobleman

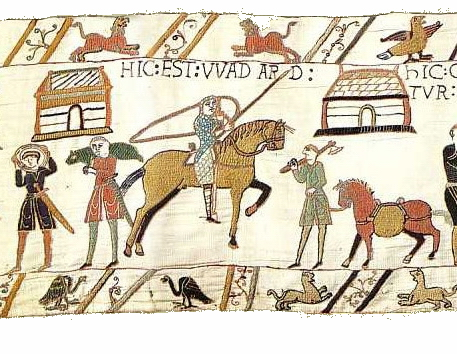
Wadard, depicted in the Bayeux Tapestry under the titulus HIC EST WADARD "Here is Wadard"

Wadard was an 11th-century Norman nobleman who is mentioned in the Domesday Book of 1086, and is depicted in the Bayeux Tapestry.

Wadard was a noble who travelled to England in 1066 with Duke William of Normandy. He is depicted and named in the Bayeux Tapestry on a foraging expedition, and may have been in the logistics section of William's army. His portrait suggests that he held a senior rank.

In the Domesday Book, Wadard is recorded as a tenant of Odo, bishop of Bayeux, holding estates amounting to about 1,260 acres in Kent and elsewhere, and providing him with an income of around £127. His holdings included Farningham, Combe, and six houses in Dover, in Kent; Cassington, Thrupp, Cogges, and Little Tew in Oxfordshire, Thames Ditton in Surrey; and Glentham in Lincolnshire.

The 14th-century chronicler William Thorne states that Scolland, Abbot of St Augustine's Abbey granted Wadard certain land in Northbourne, Kent for life, on condition that "he pay every year on the feast of Pentecost the sum of 30 shillings, together with a tenth part of everything he derived from the land".

He is recorded as a witness to a land grant to the Abbey of Saint-Pierre de Préaux in Normandy, and he was also a tenant of St Augustine's Abbey.

== Family ==
- His son Rainald held two estates from Odo at Somerton and Fritwell, adjoining his father's estate at Fringford.
- Two other sons, named Martin and Simon, are mentioned in the cartulary of the Abbey of Préaux.

== See also ==
- Bayeux Tapestry tituli
- Companions of William the Conqueror

== Sources ==
- Baggs, A. P.; Blair, W. J.; Chance, Eleanor; Colvin, Christina; Cooper, Janet; Day, C. J.; Selwyn, Nesta; Townley, Simon C. (1990). Crossley, Alan; Elrington, C. R. (eds.). A History of the County of Oxford. Victoria County History. Vol. 12: Wootton Hundred (South) including Woodstock. London: Oxford University Press for the Institute of Historical Research. pp. 36–54. ISBN 978-0-19722-774-9.
