= Scolland =

Abbot of St Augustine's Abbey

Scolland of Canterbury, also known as Scotland, was the abbot of St Augustine's Abbey during the reign of William the Conqueror. He was an aide of Lanfranc, the Archbishop of Canterbury. He conducted building works at his abbey and promoted the veneration of Augustine in Canterbury.

== Career ==
As a key aide of Bishop Lanfranc he was closely involved in the primacy debate between Lanfranc and Thomas of Bayeux, Bishop of York. He was sent as an ambassador to Rome in 1073 where he advocated for Augustine's role as apostle to the English, a doctrine that greatly assisted the case for Canterbury primacy.

In 1072 he signed the statement of the Council of London 1075. at which Bishop Lanfranc blessed him.

Scolland also rebuilt many of the Abbey buildings in the Romanesque style.

He died in 1087 and was replaced by Wido. The monks of the Abbey rebelled against Wido, and were expelled from the monastery. Several were also arrested.

== Historical attestation ==
Scolland is mentioned in Domesday Book, where he is listed as tenant-in-chief of numerous small lots in Kent, and he witnessed a number of deeds of William the Conqueror. He appears in the Vita of St Dunstan.

=== The Bayeux Tapestry ===
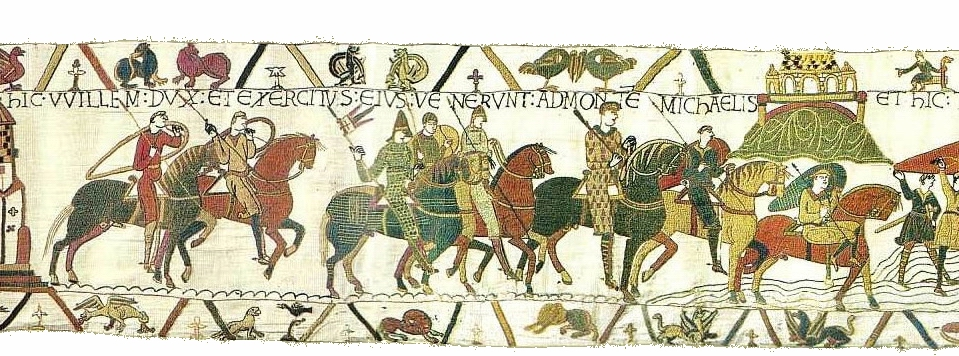
Bayeux Tapestry possibly showing Scolland, top right corner.

The abbot had been head monk in the scriptorium of Abbey of Mont Saint-Michel and carried many of the techniques developed in France to Canterbury. as well as importing a number of manuscripts from France.

Howard B. Clarke has proposed that Scolland was the designer of the tapestry, because of his previous position as head of the scriptorium at Mont Saint-Michel, his travels to Trajan's Column, and his connections to Wadard and Vital, two individuals identified in the tapestry.

Historian Richard Gameson has suggested that a monk depicted in the Bayeux Tapestry and pointing at the Abbey of Mont Saint-Michel is Abbot Scolland.
