= Turold of Rochester =

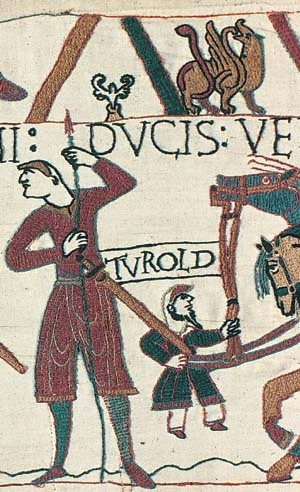
Possible depiction of Turold in the Bayeux Tapestry

Turold of Rochester was a Norman knight known from the Domesday Book. He was a vassal of Bishop Odo of Bayeux and is recorded as holding land from Odo in Kent in 1086. He became constable of Bayeux, but lost power when Bishop Odo was disgraced. He may be the Turold depicted on the Bayeux Tapestry.
