= Turold on the Bayeux Tapestry =

Uncertian caption on the Bayeux Tapestry

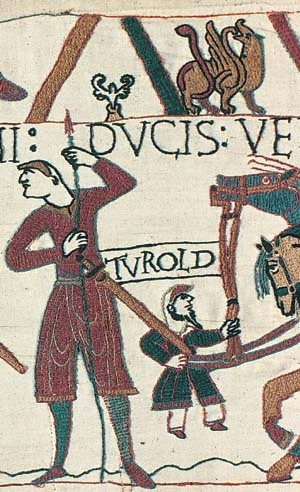
Turold depicted on the Bayeux Tapestry

Turold is one of the tituli on the Bayeux Tapestry. Which of two figures is being identified is uncertain, as is the identification of the namesake with a known historical person. He may be the same person as Turold of Rochester.

== Appearance on the Bayeux Tapestry ==
The tapestry mentions a small number of important figures by name. When they are mentioned, their name is depicted directly above their head. For this reason, some believe that Turold is not the messenger in red who would later become Constable of Bayeux, but the man who appears to have a form of dwarfism and is holding the messenger's horse's reins. It should also be noted that Turold was a common name at the time of the creation of the tapestry, and it is possible that both figures bear the name "Turold".

== Turoldus in the Song of Roland ==
The dwarf figure appears to be a jongleur or minstrel based on his wide breeches and flared tunic, leading some to further conjecture that he could be Turoldus as mentioned in the Chanson de Roland. Jongleurs of this era could be extremely skilled, therefore could reasonably be the mysterious author or performer of that poem. However, as Turold and its derivatives were popular names at the time of the creation of the oldest surviving copy of the Chanson de Roland, it is also possible the Turoldus mentioned is a third and entirely different person from those shown on the Bayeux Tapestry. This is the prevailing hypothesis among modern historians.

Turold may refer to Walter Sans Avoir, Taillefer, and Walter III of the Vexin, the father of Walter Tirel depicted as a dwarf due to his descent from the Nibelungids, the old Counts of Autun. These Counts often served as Dukes of Burgundy, Aquitaine, and Provence in Carolingian times and may have inspired the chanson. The tapestry may have been commissioned by Edith of Wessex, Walter's aunt.
