= George Wingfield Digby =

George Wingfield Digby (1912 - 9 Jan 1989) was a British textile historian. He was Keeper of Textiles at the Victoria and Albert Museum from 1947 to 1972. He was described in The Times as a “gifted interpreter of the world of textiles”.

== Biography ==
Educated at Harrow; Trinity College, Cambridge; Grenoble; the Sorbonne and Vienna, George Wingfield Digby studied modern and oriental ceramics, the art of Edvard Munch, Henry Moore, Paul Nash (artist), William Blake, and symbolism and education in the Caribbean. When the V&A was closed during World War II, he was seconded to the Education Office, Jamaica, where he co-authored History of the West Indian Peoples (1951-9) for schools.

He joined the V&A as assistant keeper in 1934, served as Keeper of Textiles at the V&A from 1947 to 1972, and remained at the museum for a year as Keeper Emeritus to compete a publication. His book Elizabethan Embroidery (1963) was the first on the subject, and set the embroiderers in their historic and socio-economic context. Similarly, his book The Devonshire Hunting Tapestries (1971) included a chapter on medieval hunting and hawking, to show their significance in society. During his Keepership at the V&A, he shaped the museum’s textile collection, including the acquisition of some important tapestries, including the medieval tapestry known as the Devonshire Hunts, and the Vuilleumier Collection of oriental textiles in 1948.

He was also a keen collector of ceramics, and with his wife Cornelia (Nelly) collected ceramics that showed the cross-fertilisation of styles, shapes and materials from China, Japan and Europe, in part influenced by the potter Bernard Leach. These were displayed at Sherborne Castle, which was the home of his brother Simon Wingfield Digby and are now in the collection of Tate St Ives. Some of their collection was sold at Christie’s in 1973 and 1974. .

== Selected Publications ==
Books

- 1951-59 History of the West Indian Peoples (4 vols) (co-authored with E.H. Carter and R.N. Norman)
- 1951 The Work of the Modern Potter in England (London: John Murray)
- 1955 Meaning and Symbol in Three Modern Artists [Munch, Moore and Nash]
- 1957 Symbol and Image in William Blake (Oxford: OUP)
- 1957 Bayeux Tapestry (Phaidon Press) (co-authored with Sir Frank Stenton, Simone Bertrand, Charles I Gibbs-Smith, Sir James Mann and John L. Nevinson.
- 1963 Elizabethan Embroidery (London: Faber and Faber)
- 1971 The Devonshire Hunting Tapestries (London: HMSO).
- 1980 Victoria & Albert Museum: The Tapestry Collection: Medieval and Renaissance (London: HMSO) (co-authored with Wendy Hefford)

Articles

- 1950 "A Set of Beauvais Tapestries alluding to the War of American Independence", The Burlington Magazine 92/570 (1950).
- 1951 “English Tapestries at Birmingham.” The Burlington Magazine 93/582 (1951).
- 1954 “Late Mortlake Tapestries”, The Connoisseur, Dec 1954.
- 1955 “English Tapestries at Burlington House.” The Burlington Magazine 97/633 (1955).
- 1979 “‘Pots of Inspiration’ Bernard Leach’s Personal Collection at the Holburne Museum, Bath.” The Burlington Magazine 121/915 (1979).
