= Vital of Bayeux =

Normand knight

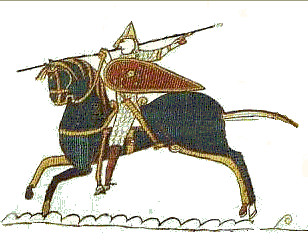
Vital of Bayeux on the Bayeux Tapestry

Vital of Bayeux was a knight of William the Conqueror, known from the Bayeux Tapestry and the Domesday Book.

Vital was one of three Norman knights named on the Bayeux tapestry. He is believed to have been a vassal of Odo of Bayeux. He is recorded as holding land from Odo in Kent in the Domesday Book in 1086.
