= Bayeux Tapestry Museum =

Art museum in Bayeux, Normandy, France

- Le musée de la Tapisserie de Bayeux
- Location: Bayeux, France
- Type: Art museum
- Collections: Bayeux Tapestry
- Website: Official website

The Bayeux Tapestry Museum is a museum in Bayeux, France, which displays and interprets the Bayeux Tapestry, an 11th-century tapestry depicting the events leading up to the Norman conquest of England, led by William, Duke of Normandy, and the Battle of Hastings in 1066.

The museum opened in 1983 and it is in the former Bayeux Seminary. The museum hung the tapestry vertically.

The museum is one of three operated by the city. The others are the Memorial Museum of the Battle of Normandy and the MAHB Museum of Art and History Baron Gerard.

The museum is currently closed for renovation until October 2027.
