= Bayeux Tapestry =

Embroidery depicting the 1066 Norman invasion of England

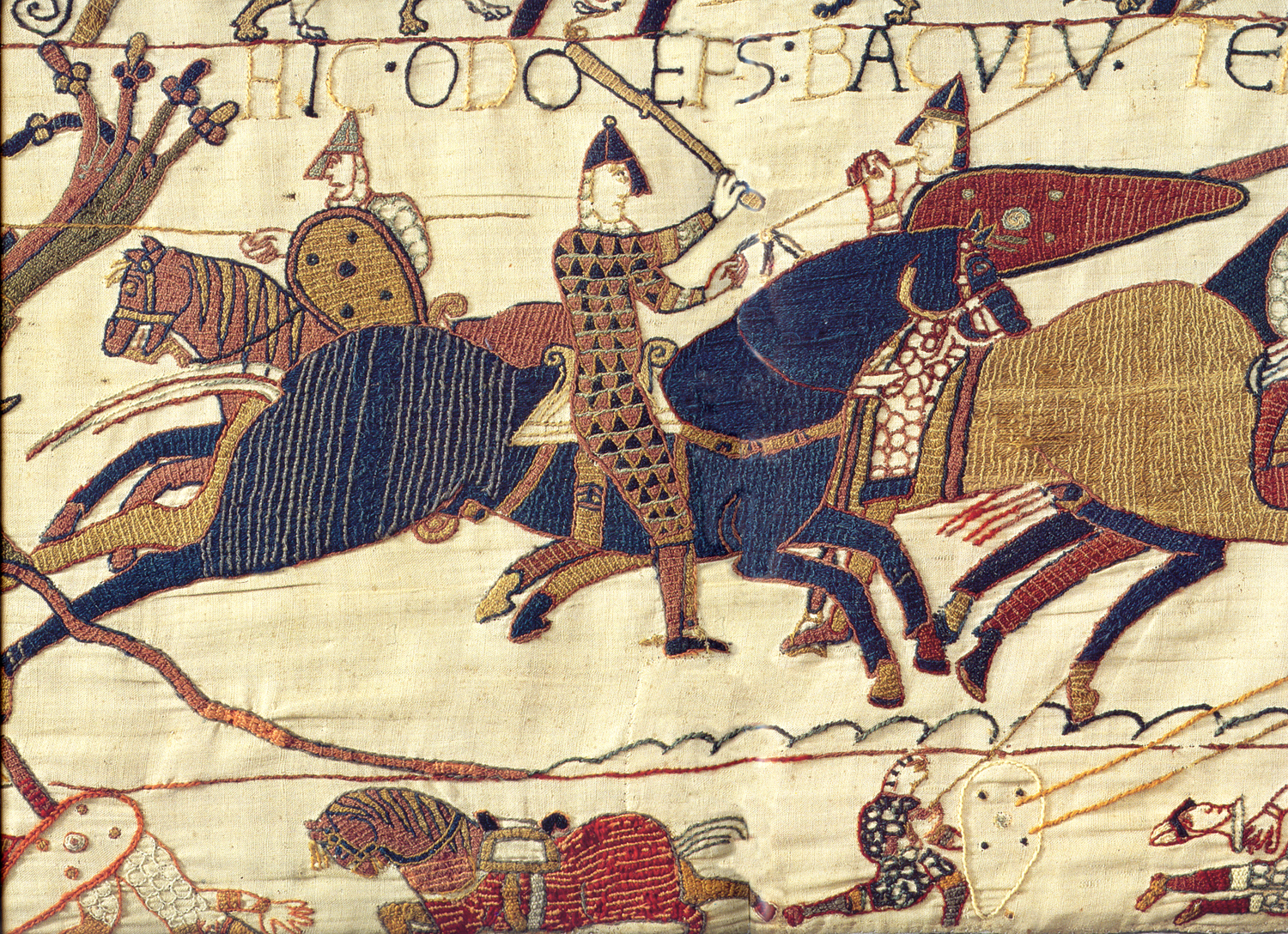
A scene from the Bayeux Tapestry depicting Bishop Odo of Bayeux rallying Duke William's army during the Battle of Hastings in 1066

The Bayeux Tapestry (Note: UK: /baɪˈjɜː, beɪ-/, US: /ˈbeɪjuː, ˈbaɪ-/ B(A)Y-yoo; French: Tapisserie de Bayeux [tapisʁi də bajø] or La telle du conquest; Latin: Tapete Baiocense) (French: Tapisserie de Bayeux) is an embroidered cloth nearly 70 metres (230 feet) long and 50 centimetres (20 inches) tall that depicts the events leading up to the Norman conquest of England, led by William, Duke of Normandy, and the Battle of Hastings in 1066. It is normally thought to have been made in England in the decades after the events it shows, although the earliest known written reference to it was in 1476. Since 2007 it has been inscribed on UNESCO's Memory of the World Register. It is normally displayed in the Bayeux Tapestry Museum in Bayeux, Normandy, France, but this is closed for renovation until 2027, and the work is currently on display in London.

Despite its name, the work is technically an embroidery rather than a true tapestry, since the images are stitched rather than woven into the fabric. It was worked in wool thread on a coarse linen ground using four different stitches and ten natural dye colours. The cloth now consists of 58 scenes, (Note: The exact number of scenes is not clearly defined; the Musée de la Tapisserie de Bayeux and the tapestry itself state 58 scenes, although some interpretations regard the tapestry as being divided into 70 scenes.) all with Medieval Latin tituli. The surviving piece depicts 623 human figures, 994 animals, 438 plants, 37 buildings and fortifications, 41 ships and boats, and a vast array of other objects. The narrative runs from the final years of the reign of Edward the Confessor in 1064 through to the Battle of Hastings in 1066, when William, Duke of Normandy, defeated Harold Godwinson to claim the English throne. The final scenes are missing.

The tapestry gives a detailed account of the battle's key turning points, though nearly half of its scenes actually cover events that preceded the invasion itself. It is generally thought to have been commissioned by Bishop Odo of Bayeux, William's half-brother who appears four times, and produced in England in the years following the Conquest. Although it presents the Conquest from a viewpoint highly favourable to William, leading some historians to read it as propaganda meant to legitimise his rule and win over the Anglo-Saxon nobility, the tapestry remains an invaluable historical source on 11th-century life in the Duchy of Normandy and England, documenting clothing, castles, ships and everyday customs of the period. It also stands as one of the few surviving examples of secular Romanesque art.

According to Sylvette Lemagnen, a former conservator of the tapestry, in her book La Tapisserie de Bayeux (2005):

The Bayeux tapestry is one of the supreme achievements of the Norman Romanesque. ... Its survival almost intact over nine centuries is little short of miraculous. ... Its exceptional length, the harmony and freshness of its colours, its exquisite workmanship, and the genius of its guiding spirit combine to make it endlessly fascinating.

In 1729, it was rediscovered by scholars at a time when it was being displayed annually in the cathedral. The tapestry was kept in the treasury of Bayeux Cathedral until the late 18th century, narrowly escaping destruction during the French Revolution. Since 1983 it has been on permanent public display at the Séminaire de Bayeux.

In September 2026 the tapestry travelled outside France for the first time in its history, on loan to the British Museum in London while the Bayeux museum underwent renovation. It is due to return to France by July 2027.

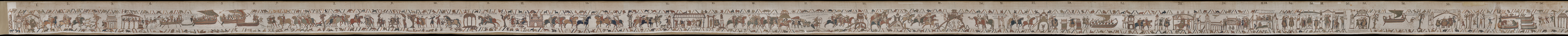
First half of the tapestry, depicting the events leading up to the Norman invasion (scroll left to right)
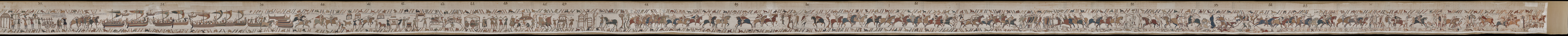
Second half of the tapestry, depicting the Norman army crossing the English Channel and the Battle of Hastings (scroll left to right)

== History ==
=== Origins ===
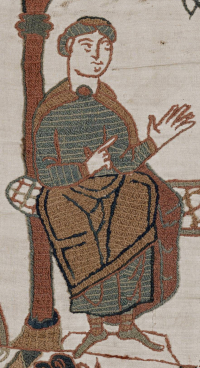
Detail of Bishop Odo of Bayeux

The earliest known written reference to the tapestry is a 1476 inventory of Bayeux Cathedral, but its origins have been the subject of much speculation and controversy.

French legend maintained the tapestry was commissioned and created by Queen Matilda, the powerful wife of William the Conqueror, and her ladies-in-waiting. Indeed, in France, it is occasionally known as La Tapisserie de la Reine Mathilde ("The Tapestry of Queen Matilda"). However, scholarly analysis in the 20th century concluded it was probably commissioned by William's half-brother, Bishop Odo of Bayeux, who, after the Conquest, also became Earl of Kent and, when William was absent in Normandy, regent of England.

The reasons for the Odo commission theory include:

- three of the bishop's followers mentioned in the Domesday Book appear on the tapestry
- it was found in Bayeux Cathedral, built by Odo
- it may have been commissioned at the same time as the cathedral's construction in the 1070s, and possibly completed by 1077 in time for display at the cathedral's dedication
- Odo himself appears four times

If the tapestry was indeed commissioned by Odo, it was probably designed and constructed in England by Anglo-Saxon artists, with most contemporary scholars arguing that it was probably made in or around Canterbury: it is similar to illuminated manuscripts made in monastic libraries there or owned by them; Odo's English power base was by then in Kent; the Latin text contains hints of Anglo-Saxon; other embroideries originate from England at this time; and the vegetable dyes can be found in cloth traditionally woven there.

Howard B. Clarke, professor emeritus at University College, Dublin, proposed in 2012 that the designer of the tapestry (i.e., the individual responsible for its overall narrative and political argument) was Scolland, the abbot of St Augustine's Abbey in Canterbury, because of his previous position as head of the scriptorium at Mont-Saint-Michel (famed for its illumination), his travels to Trajan's Column in Rome, and his connections to Wadard and Vital, two individuals identified in the tapestry. Alternatively, Christine Grainge has argued that the designer may have been Lanfranc, Archbishop of Canterbury 1070–1089. The actual physical work of stitching was most probably undertaken by women needleworkers. Anglo-Saxon needlework of the more detailed type known as Opus Anglicanum was famous across Europe. It was perhaps commissioned for display in the hall of Odo's palace in Bayeux and then bequeathed to the cathedral he had built, following the precedent of the documented but lost hanging of the Anglo-Saxon warrior Byrhtnoth, bequeathed by his widow to Ely Abbey.

Other theories exist. Carola Hicks has suggested the tapestry could possibly have been commissioned by Edith of Wessex, widow of Edward the Confessor and sister of Harold. Wolfgang Grape has challenged the consensus that the embroidery is Anglo-Saxon, distinguishing between Anglo-Saxon and other Northern European techniques. Medieval material authority Elizabeth Coatsworth contradicted this: "The attempt to distinguish Anglo-Saxon from other Northern European embroideries before 1100 on the grounds of technique cannot be upheld on the basis of present knowledge." George Beech has suggested that the tapestry was executed at the Abbey of Saint-Florent, Saumur in the Loire Valley, the detailed depiction of the Breton campaign implying additional sources in France. Historical author Andrew Bridgeford has suggested that the tapestry was actually of English design and encoded with secret messages meant to undermine Norman rule. Some, including Janina Ramirez, argue that nuns of Barking Abbey, Essex, most likely embroidered the piece. She cites the close association between the institutions at Barking and Canterbury, but favours Barking over Canterbury because King William lived at the abbey for a while after the conquest and publicly endorsed the abbess with his approval. It is conjectured that the work may have been a gift from the abbey to the king to ensure that the relationship continued.

=== Recorded history ===
==== To the French Revolution ====
It has been known by several names over the centuries: the canons of Bayeux Cathedral called it the Telle du Conquest ("Cloth of the Conquest"), 18th-century sources referred to it as the Toilette de la Saint-Jean or the Toilette du duc Guillaume, and in the 19th century it was sometimes called the Tapestry of Queen Matilda.

The first reference to the tapestry is from 1476 when it was listed in an inventory of the treasures of Bayeux Cathedral. It survived the sack of Bayeux by the Huguenots in 1562, and the next certain reference is from 1724. Antoine Lancelot sent a report to the Académie Royale des Inscriptions et Belles-Lettres concerning a sketch he had received about a work concerning William the Conqueror. He had no idea where or what the original was, although he suggested it could have been a tapestry. Despite further enquiries he discovered no more.

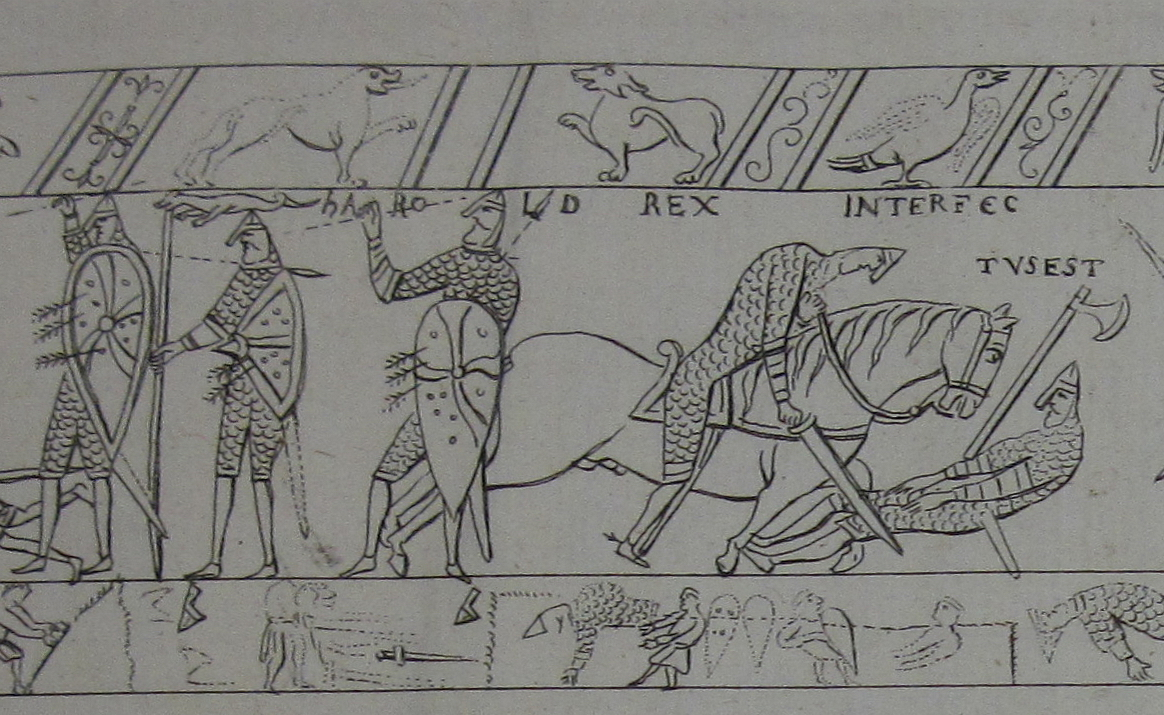
Montfaucon / Benoît drawing showing King Harold's death

The inventory listing of 1476 shows that the tapestry was being hung annually in Bayeux Cathedral for the week of the Feast of St John the Baptist; this was still the case in 1728, although by that time the purpose was merely to air the hanging, which was otherwise stored in a chest. Clearly, the work was being well cared for. By the eighteenth century, however, the artistry was regarded as crude or even barbarous—red and yellow multi-coloured horses upset some critics. It was thought to be unfinished because the linen was not covered with embroidery.

The Benedictine scholar Bernard de Montfaucon made more successful investigations and found that the sketch was of a small portion of a tapestry preserved at Bayeux Cathedral. In 1729 and 1730, he published drawings and a detailed description of the complete work in the first two volumes of his Les Monuments de la Monarchie française. The drawings were by Antoine Benoît, one of the ablest draughtsmen of that time.

The tapestry was first briefly noted in English in 1746 by William Stukeley, in his Palaeographia Britannica. The first detailed account in English was written by the English antiquary Smart Lethieullier, who was living in Paris in 1732–33, and was acquainted with Lancelot and de Montfaucon: it was not published, however, until 1767, as an appendix to Andrew Ducarel's Anglo-Norman Antiquities.

==== French Revolution onwards ====
During the French Revolution, in 1792, the tapestry was confiscated as public property to be used for covering military wagons. It was rescued from a wagon by a local lawyer who stored it in his house until the troubles were over, whereupon he sent it to the city administrators for safekeeping. After the Reign of Terror, the Fine Arts Commission, set up to safeguard national treasures in 1803, required it to be removed to Paris for display at the Musée Napoléon.

Its exhibition in the Louvre in 1797 caused a sensation, with Le Moniteur, which normally dealt with foreign affairs, reporting on it on its first two pages. It inspired a one-act musical play, La Tapisserie de la Reine Mathilde, in 1804. It was because the tapestry was regarded as an antiquity rather than a work of art that in 1804 it was returned to Bayeux, where in 1823 one commentator, A. L. Léchaudé d'Anisy, reported that "there is a sort of purity in its primitive forms, especially considering the state of the arts in the eleventh century".

When Napoleon abandoned his planned invasion of Britain, the tapestry's propaganda value was lost and it was returned to Bayeux where the council displayed it on a winding apparatus of two cylinders. Despite scholars' concern that the tapestry was becoming damaged, the council refused to return it to the cathedral.

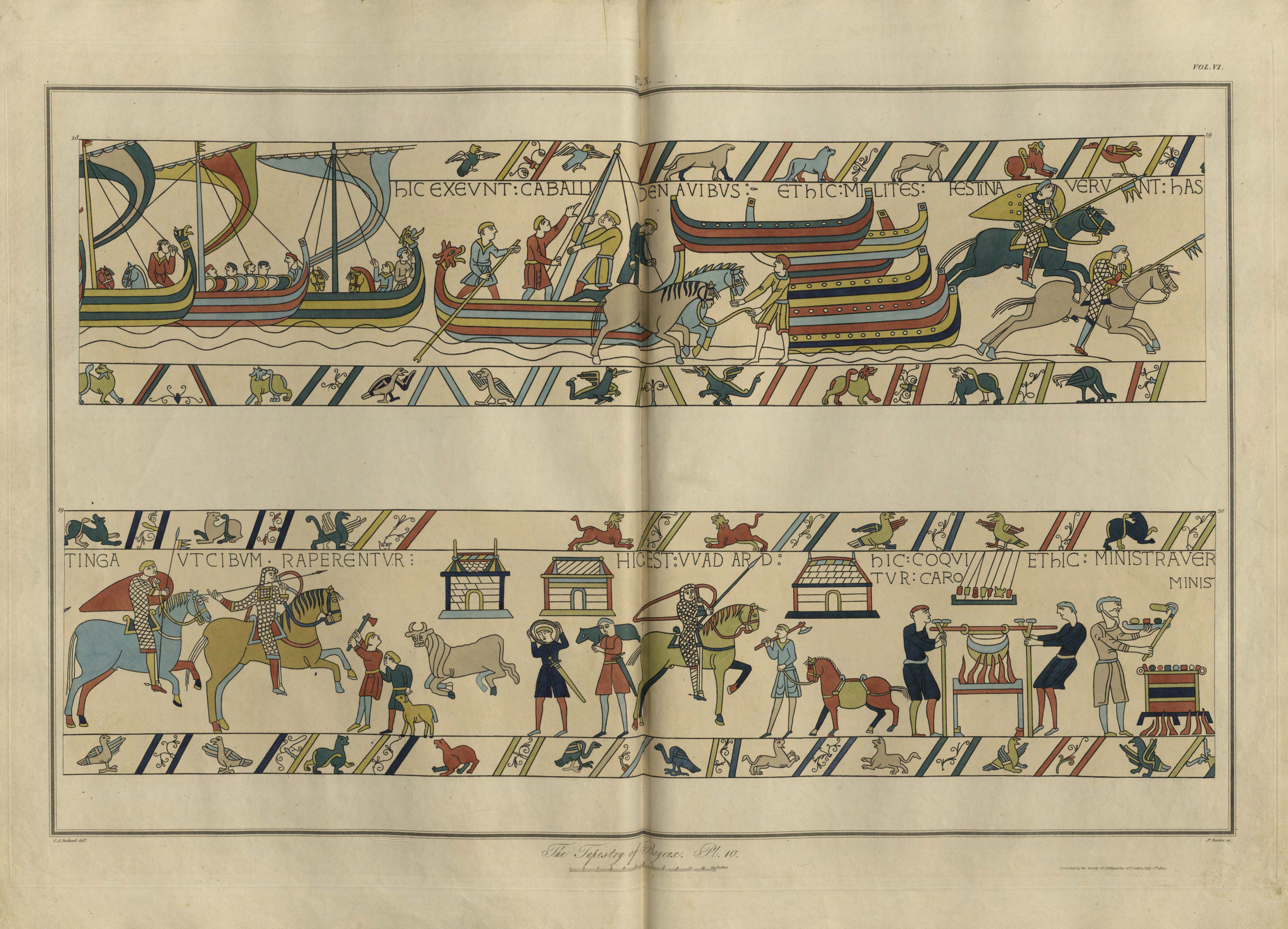
Stothard / Basire engravings: scenes showing the Norman troops crossing the Channel and landing in Sussex

In 1816, the Society of Antiquaries of London commissioned its historical draughtsman, Charles Stothard, to visit Bayeux to make an accurate hand-coloured facsimile of the tapestry. His drawings were subsequently engraved by James Basire Jr. and published by the Society in 1819–1823. Stothard's images are still of value as a record of the tapestry as it was before 19th-century restoration.

The tapestry was becoming a tourist attraction, with Robert Southey complaining of the need to queue to see the work. In the 1843 Hand-book for Travellers in France by John Murray III, a visit was included on "Recommended Route 26 (Caen to Cherbourg via Bayeux)", and this guidebook led John Ruskin to go there; he would describe the tapestry as "the most interesting thing in its way conceivable". Charles Dickens, however, was not impressed: "It is certainly the work of amateurs; very feeble amateurs at the beginning and very heedless some of them too."

By 1842, the tapestry was displayed in a special-purpose room in the Bibliothèque Publique. It required special storage in 1870, with the threatened invasion of Normandy in the Franco-Prussian War, and again in 1939–1944 by the Ahnenerbe during the German occupation of France and the Normandy landings. During the war Heinrich Himmler coveted the work, regarding it as "important for our glorious and cultured Germanic history". In 1941, during the Nazi occupation of France, fragments from the underside of the tapestry were taken by a research team sent to study Germany's "ancestral heritage". The fragments were discovered in 2023, and returned to Bayeux in 2026.

On 27 June 1944 the Gestapo took the tapestry to the Louvre, and on 18 August, three days before the Wehrmacht withdrew from Paris, Himmler sent a message (intercepted by Bletchley Park) ordering it to be taken to "a place of safety", thought to be Berlin. It was only on 22 August that the SS attempted to take possession of the tapestry, by which time the Louvre was again in French hands. After the liberation of Paris on 25 August, the tapestry was returned to public display in the Louvre, between November and December 1944, on a 70-metre (230 ft) long picture rail, in the Italian Primitives room. In March 1945 it was returned to Bayeux and in October, it was once again put on display, in a glass showcase at the Hotel Doyen.

In 2007, UNESCO admitted the tapestry to its Memory of the World International Register which lists globally important documentary heritage.

==== Loan to the United Kingdom ====
In 2018 French President Emmanuel Macron announced that the tapestry would be loaned to Britain for public display. An initial exhibition date at the British Museum in 2022 was announced but did not materialise, amid claims that it was in dire need of repairs, which were scheduled to begin in 2024.

During his state visit to the UK in July 2025, Macron announced that the tapestry would be loaned to the British Museum from September 2026 to June 2027 in exchange for items from the Sutton Hoo collection, the Lewis chessmen or the Battersea Shield being loaned to museums in Rouen and Caen. It would be the first time in 900 years that the tapestry had been in Britain. Shortly afterwards, French art historian Didier Rykner launched a petition to block the loan, claiming that transporting the tapestry could damage its fabric. By 19 August, over 40,000 people had signed the petition.

The Bayeux Tapestry Museum closed for renovation in August 2025. On 19 September 2025, the tapestry was removed from its museum, for the first time since 1983, as part of preparations for its loan to Britain. The UK government announced in December 2025 that the UK would be liable for covering up to £800 million in potential damage to the tapestry during its loan. The British Museum secured a £5 million sponsorship from hedge fund billionaire Igor Tulchinsky for its exhibition. Transport of the tapestry was achieved using a padded folding screen called a paravent; exhibition curator Professor Michael Lewis explained: "The tapestry [was] essentially folded back on itself in a concertina-type way." Transport across the channel was tested twice, once with a paravent containing a replica tapestry and a second time with a complete trip to the British Museum. At the museum the tapestry was installed in the Sainsbury Exhibitions Gallery, laid flat inside a custom-designed display case.

The tapestry arrived at the British Museum on 10 July 2026. On 2 September, before the exhibition's opening, King Charles III, Queen Camilla, President Macron, Brigitte Macron, UK Prime Minister Andy Burnham and his wife Marie-France van Heel viewed the tapestry.

Tickets for the first four months of the exhibition, scheduled to run from 10 September 2026 to 11 July 2027, sold out within 24 hours, with more than 80,000 people queuing online. Another batch of public tickets would go on sale on 21 October.

The exhibition opened to the public on 10 September 2026 and attracted significant public interest, with Reuters describing the response as "Bayeux mania". Visitors were expected to take about 40 minutes to view the tapestry and after the first few days were not permitted to photograph the tapestry, as they were taking too long.

== Construction, design and technique ==
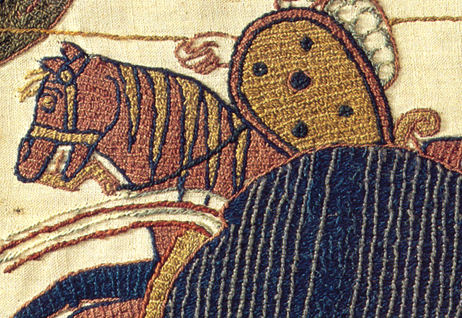
Detail of stem stitching and laid work

In common with other embroidered hangings of the early medieval period, this piece is conventionally referred to as a "tapestry", although it is not a true tapestry in which the design is woven into the cloth in tapestry weave; it is technically an embroidery, although it meets the traditional broader definition of "tapestry" as: "A textile fabric decorated with designs of ornament or pictorial subjects, painted, embroidered, or woven in colours, used for wall hangings, curtains, covers for seats, ..."

The Bayeux tapestry is embroidered in crewel (wool yarn) on a tabby-woven linen ground 68.38 m long and 70 cm tall (224.3 ft × 2.3 ft) of which about 50 centimetres (20 in) are devoted to the embroidery itself. It uses two methods of stitching: outline or stem stitch for lettering and the outlines of figures, and couching or laid work for filling in figures. Nine linen panels, between fourteen and three metres in length, were sewn together after each was embroidered and the joins were disguised with subsequent embroidery. At the first join (end of scene 13) the borders do not line up properly but the technique was improved so that the later joins are practically invisible.

The design involved a broad central zone with narrow decorative borders top and bottom. By inspecting the woollen threads behind the linen it is apparent all these aspects were embroidered together at a session and the awkward placing of the tituli is not due to them being added later. Later generations have patched the hanging in numerous places and some of the embroidery (especially in the final scene) has been reworked. The tapestry may well have maintained much of its original appearance—it now compares closely with a careful drawing made in 1730.

The end of the tapestry has been missing from time immemorial and the final titulus "Et fuga verterunt Angli" ("and the English retreated") is said to be "entirely spurious", added shortly before 1814 at a time of anti-English sentiment. Musset speculates the hanging was originally about 1.5 metres (4 ft 11 in) longer. In the last section still remaining, the embroidery has been almost completely restored, but this seems to have been done with at least some regard for the original stitching. The stylised tree is quite unlike any other tree in the tapestry. The start of the tapestry has also been restored but to a much lesser extent.

Norton (Note: Professor Christopher Norton is emeritus professor of History of Art at the University of York in the Centre for Medieval Studies.) has reviewed the various measurements of the length of the tapestry itself and of its nine individual linen panels. He has also attempted to estimate the size and architectural design of the 11th-century Bayeux Cathedral. He considers the tapestry would have fitted well if it had been hung along the south, west, and north arcades of the nave and that the scenes it depicts can be correlated with positions of the arcade bays in a way that would have been dramatically satisfying. He agrees with earlier speculation that a final panel is missing—one that shows William's coronation and which he thinks was some three metres long. In 2012, embroiderers in Alderney collaborated with David Bates to reconstruct this missing panel. Norton concludes that the tapestry was definitely designed to be hung in Bayeux Cathedral specifically; that it was designed to appeal to a Norman audience; and that it was probably designed for Bishop Odo so as to be displayed at the dedication of the cathedral in 1077 in the presence of William, Matilda, their sons, and Odo.

The main yarn colours are terracotta or russet, blue-green, dull gold, olive green, and blue, with small amounts of dark blue or black and sage green. Later repairs are worked in light yellow, orange, and light greens. Laid yarns are couched in place with yarn of the same or contrasting colour.

The tapestry's central zone contains most of the action, which sometimes overflows into the borders either for dramatic effect or because depictions would otherwise be very cramped (for example at Edward's death scene). Events take place in a long series of scenes which are generally separated by highly stylised trees. However, the trees are not placed consistently and the greatest scene shift, between Harold's audience with Edward after his return to England and Edward's burial scene, is not marked in any way at all.

The tituli are normally in the central zone but occasionally use the top border. While the borders often seem merely decorative, recent scholarship suggests that the margins carry a distinct narrative function, offering a parallel commentary to guide medieval viewers. The decoration consists of birds, beasts, fish and scenes from fables, agriculture, and hunting. There are frequent oblique bands separating the vignettes. There are nude figures, some of corpses from battle, others of a ribald nature. A harrow, a newly invented implement, is shown in scene 10, its earliest known depiction. The picture of Halley's Comet, which appears in the upper border at (scene 32), is also the first known picture of this comet.

In 1724, a linen backing cloth was sewn on comparatively crudely, and around the year 1800, large numerals were written in ink on the backing, broadly enumerating each scene and which are still commonly used for reference.

== Background ==
=== Background of the events depicted ===
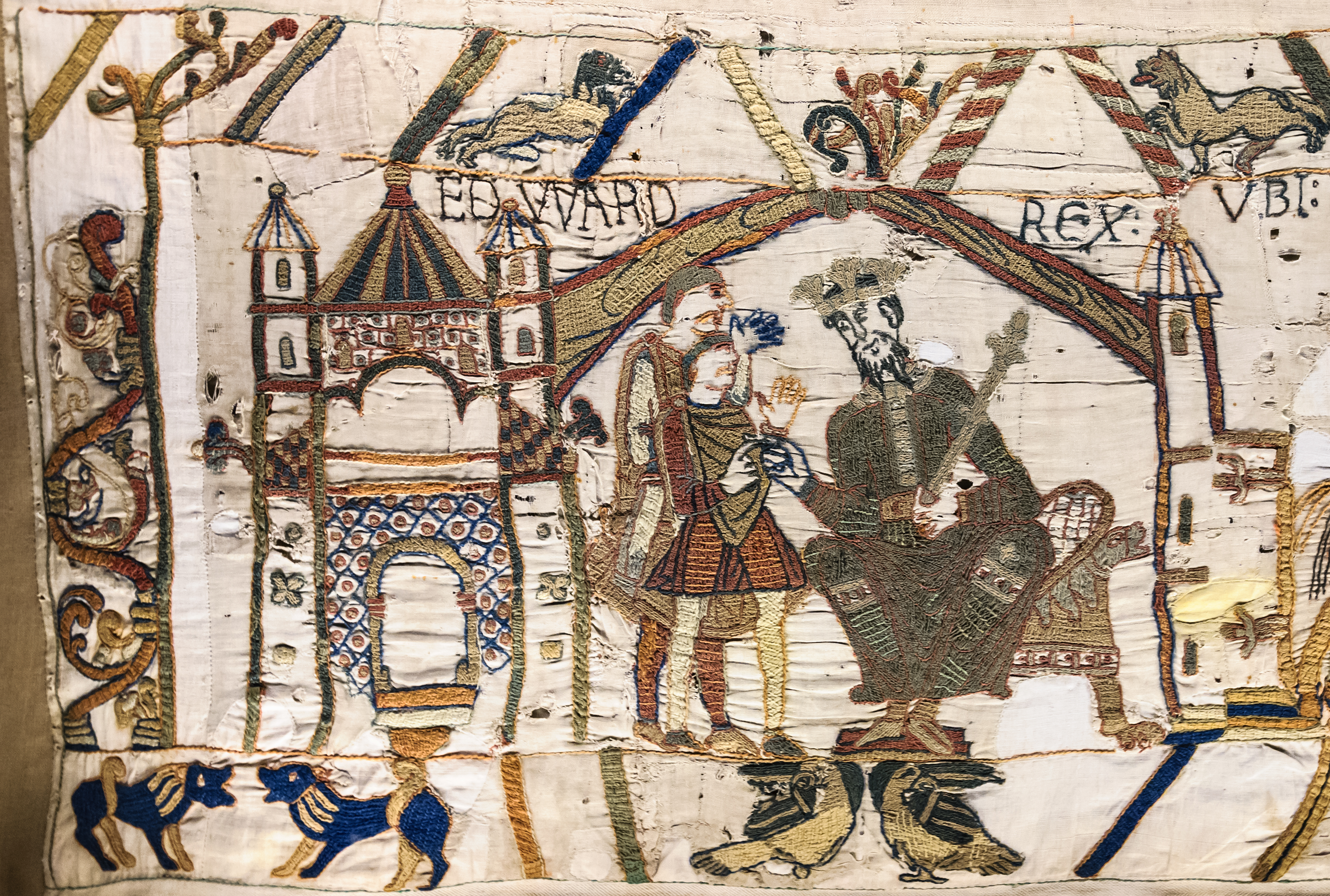
Edward the Confessor sending Harold to Normandy

In a series of pictures supported by a written commentary, the tapestry tells the story of the events of 1064–1066 culminating in the Battle of Hastings. The two main protagonists are Harold Godwinson, recently crowned King of England, leading the Anglo-Saxon English, and William, Duke of Normandy, leading a mainly Norman army, sometimes called the companions of William the Conqueror.

William was the illegitimate son of Robert the Magnificent, Duke of Normandy, and Herleva (or Arlette), a tanner's daughter. William became Duke of Normandy at the age of seven and was in control of Normandy by the age of nineteen. His half-brother was Bishop Odo of Bayeux.

King Edward the Confessor, king of England and about sixty years old at the time the tapestry starts its narration, had no children or any clear successor. Edward's mother, Emma of Normandy, was William's great aunt. At that time succession to the English throne was not by primogeniture but was decided jointly by the king and by an assembly of nobility, the Witenagemot.

Harold Godwinson, Earl of Wessex and the most powerful noble in England, was Edward's brother-in-law. The Norman chronicler William of Poitiers reported that Edward had previously determined that William would succeed him on the throne, and Harold had sworn to honour this, and yet later that Harold had claimed Edward, on his deathbed, had made him heir over William. However, other sources, such as Eadmer dispute this claim.

=== Artistic context ===
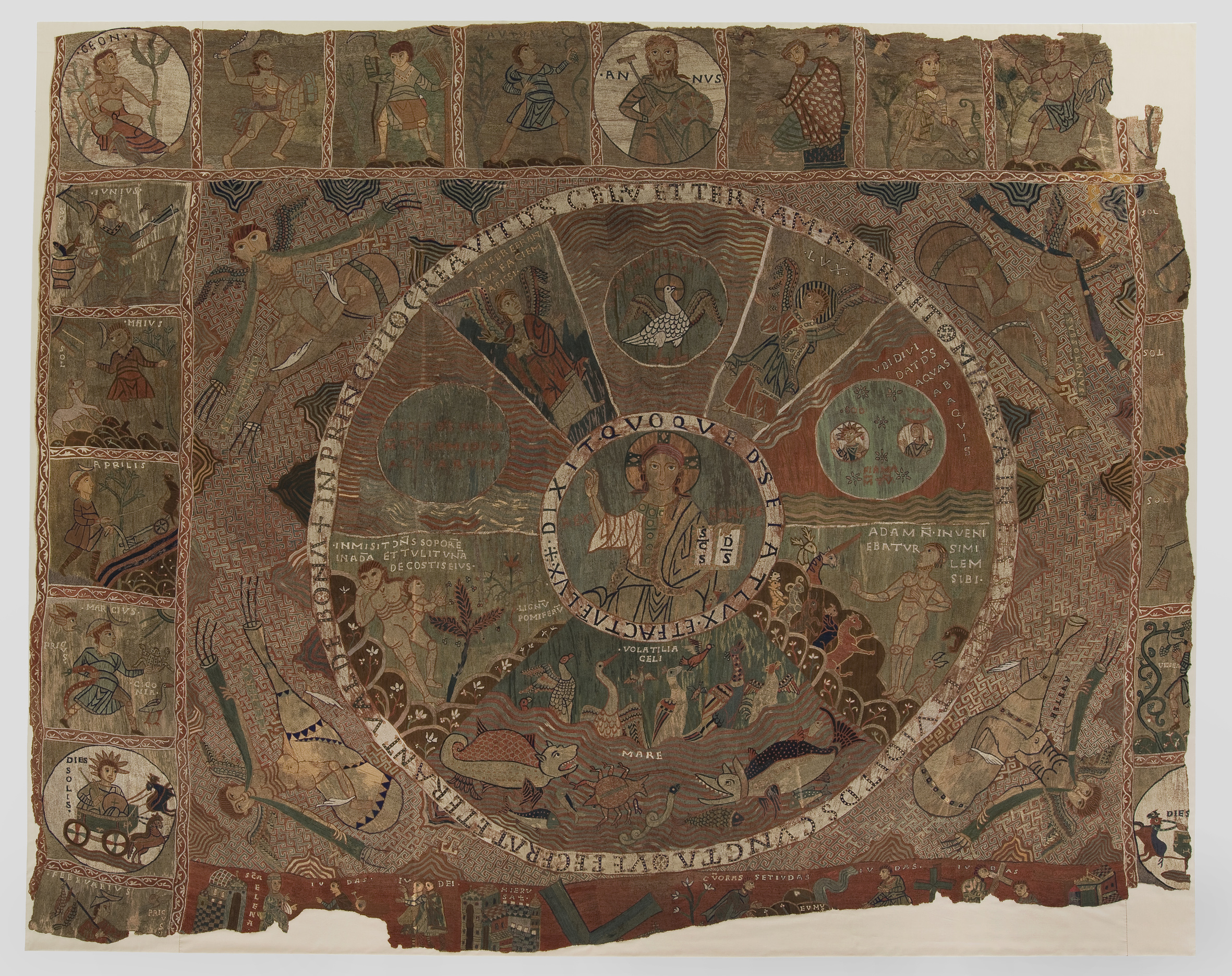
The Tapestry of Creation or Girona Tapestry (actually needlework), 11th-century, 3.65 m × 4.70 m (12.0 ft × 15.4 ft)

Tapestry fragments have been found in Scandinavia dating from the ninth century and it is thought that Norman and Anglo-Saxon embroidery developed from this sort of work. Examples are to be found in the grave goods of the Oseberg ship and the Överhogdal tapestries.

A monastic text from Ely, the Liber Eliensis, mentions a woven narrative wall-hanging commemorating the deeds of Byrhtnoth, killed in 991. Wall-hangings were common by the tenth century, with English and Norman texts particularly commending the skill of Anglo-Saxon seamstresses. Mural paintings imitating draperies still exist in France and Italy, and there are twelfth-century mentions of other wall-hangings in Normandy and France. A poem by Baldric of Dol might even describe the Bayeux Tapestry itself. The Bayeux Tapestry was therefore not unique at the time it was created; rather it is remarkable for being the sole surviving example of medieval narrative needlework.

Very few hangings from the 11th century survive, but the Tapestry of Creation, or Girona Tapestry, is a large Romanesque panel of needlework, in the Museum of Girona Cathedral, Catalonia, Spain. The hanging depicts a series of figures from the Book of Genesis and personifications of the months. The Cloth of Saint Gereon, in Germany, is the largest of a group of fragments from hangings based on decorative Byzantine silks, including animals, that are probably the earliest European survivals.

== Content ==
=== Events depicted ===
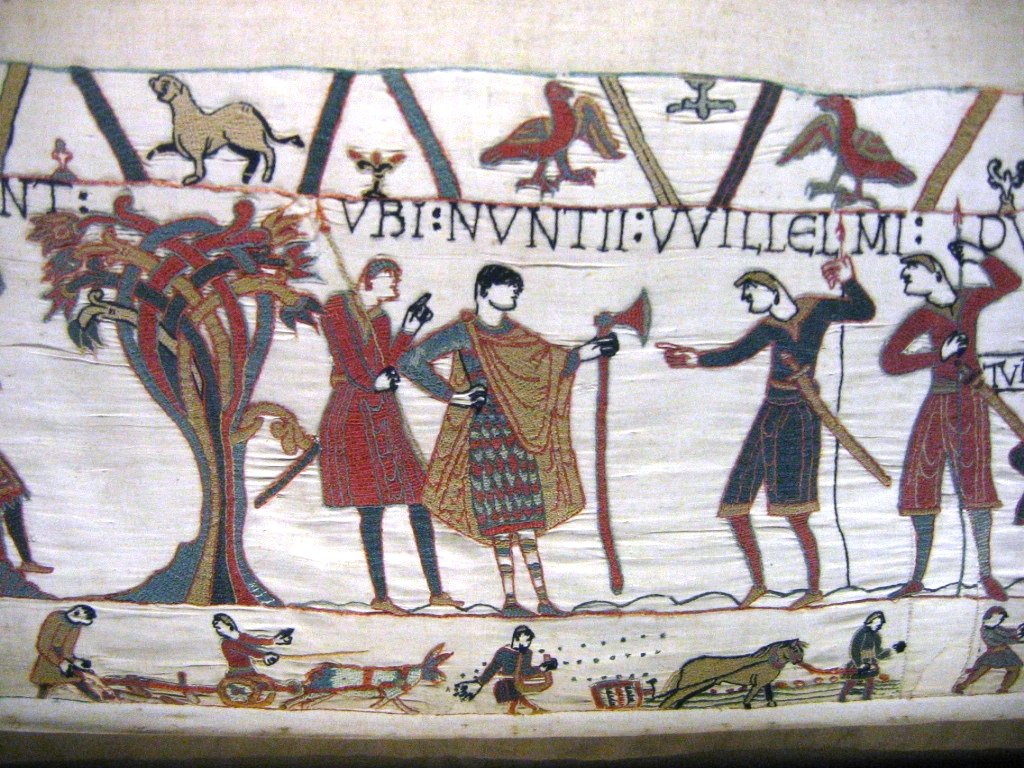
The messengers with Guy I of Ponthieu, with a portrayal of medieval agriculture in the border

The tapestry begins with a panel of Edward the Confessor sending Harold to Normandy.^{(scene 1)} Later Norman sources say that the mission was for Harold to pledge loyalty to William but the tapestry does not suggest any specific purpose. By mischance, Harold arrives at the wrong location in France and is taken prisoner by Guy I of Ponthieu (also known in the tapestry as Wido).^{(scene 7)} After exchanges of messages borne by mounted messengers, Harold is released to William, who then invites Harold to accompany him on a campaign against Conan II, Duke of Brittany. On the way, just outside the monastery of Mont Saint-Michel, the army becomes mired in quicksand and Harold saves two Norman soldiers.^{(scene 17)} William's army chases Conan from Dol de Bretagne to Rennes, and Conan finally surrenders at Dinan.^{(scene 20)} William gives Harold arms and armour (possibly knighting him) and Harold takes an oath on saintly relics.^{(scene 23)} Although the writing on the tapestry explicitly states an oath is taken there is no clue as to what is being promised.

Harold leaves for home and meets again with the old king Edward, who appears to be remonstrating with him.^{(scene 25)} Harold is in a somewhat submissive posture and seems to be in disgrace. However, possibly deliberately, the king's intentions are not made clear. The scene then shifts by about one year to when Edward has become mortally ill and the tapestry strongly suggests that, on his deathbed, he bequeaths the crown to Harold. (Note: 5 January 1066.) What is probably the coronation ceremony (Note: 6 January 1066.) is attended by Stigand, whose position as Archbishop of Canterbury was controversial.^{(scene 31)} Stigand is performing a liturgical function, possibly not the crowning itself. The tapestry labels the celebrant as "Stigant Archieps" (Stigand the archbishop) although by that time he had been excommunicated by the papacy who considered his appointment unlawful.

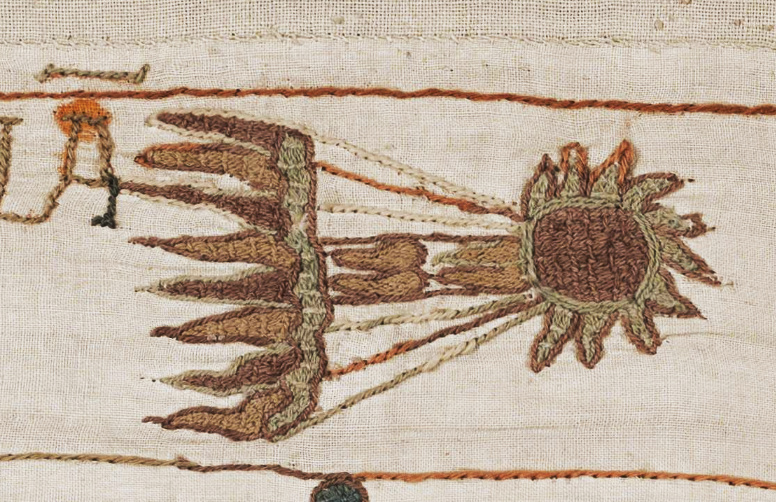
Detail of Halley's Comet

A star with a streaming tail, now known to be Halley's Comet, then appears. (Note: A comet was believed to be a bad omen at this time and Halley's comet would have first appeared in 1066 around 24 April, nearly four months after Harold's coronation.) At this point, the lower border of the tapestry shows a fleet of ghost-like ships thus hinting at a future invasion.^{(scene 33)} The news of Harold's coronation is taken to Normandy, whereupon we are told that William is ordering a fleet of ships to be built although it is Bishop Odo shown issuing the instructions.^{(scene 35)} The invaders reach England, and land unopposed. William orders his men to find food, and a meal is cooked.^{(scene 43)} A house is burnt by two soldiers, which may indicate some ravaging of the local countryside on the part of the invaders, and underneath, on a smaller scale than the arsonists, a woman holds her boy's hand as she asks for humanity.^{(scene 47)} News is brought to William. (Note: Possibly about Harold's victory in the Battle of Stamford Bridge, although the Tapestry does not specify this.) The Normans build a motte and bailey at Hastings to defend their position. Messengers are sent between the two armies, and William makes a speech to prepare his army for battle.^{(scene 51)}

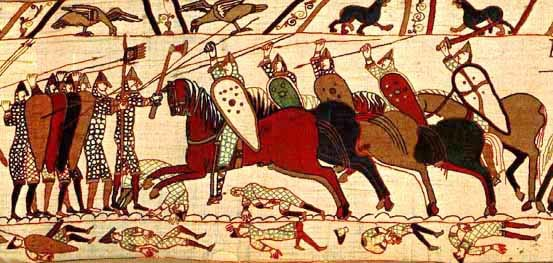
Detail of the Battle of Hastings

The Battle of Hastings was fought on 14 October 1066 less than three weeks after the Battle of Stamford Bridge but the tapestry does not provide this context. The English fight on foot behind a shield wall, whilst the Normans are on horses. (Note: This reflected the military reality.) Two fallen knights are named as Leofwine and Gyrth, Harold's brothers, but both armies are shown fighting bravely. Bishop Odo brandishes his baton or mace and rallies the Norman troops in battle.^{(scene 54)} (Note: Clerics were not supposed to shed blood, hence Odo has no sword. Rather than just praying for the Norman knights, however, which ought to have been his role, Odo seems militarily active.) To reassure his knights that he is still alive and well, William raises his helmet to show his face. The battle becomes very bloody with troops being slaughtered and dismembered corpses littering the ground. King Harold is killed.^{(scene 57)} This scene can be interpreted in different ways, as the name "Harold" appears above a number of knights, making it difficult to identify which character is Harold, since one character appears with an arrow shot in his head under the name "Harold" while another character is slain by a sword underneath the words "was slain" . The final remaining scene shows unarmoured English troops fleeing the battlefield. The last part of the tapestry is missing; however, it is thought that the story contained only one additional scene.

=== People depicted ===
The following is a list of known persons depicted on the Bayeux Tapestry:

- Ælfgifu, a woman of uncertain identity
- Archbishop Stigand
- Conan II, Duke of Brittany
- Edith of Wessex
- Edward the Confessor
- Eustace, Count of Boulogne
- Gyrth Godwinson
- Guy I, Count of Ponthieu
- Hakon
- Harold, Earl of Wessex
- Leofwine Godwinson
- Odo, Bishop of Bayeux
- Robert the Staller
- Robert, Count of Mortain
- Scolland
- Turold
- Wadard
- William II, Duke of Normandy
- Vital

=== Latin text ===
Tituli are included in many scenes to explain the event being depicted and point out names of specific people and places. The text is in Latin but at times the style of words and spelling shows an English influence. A dark blue wool, almost black, is mostly used but towards the end of the tapestry other colours are used, sometimes for each word and other times for each letter. The complete text and English translation are displayed beside images of each scene at Bayeux Tapestry tituli.

== Unsettled questions ==
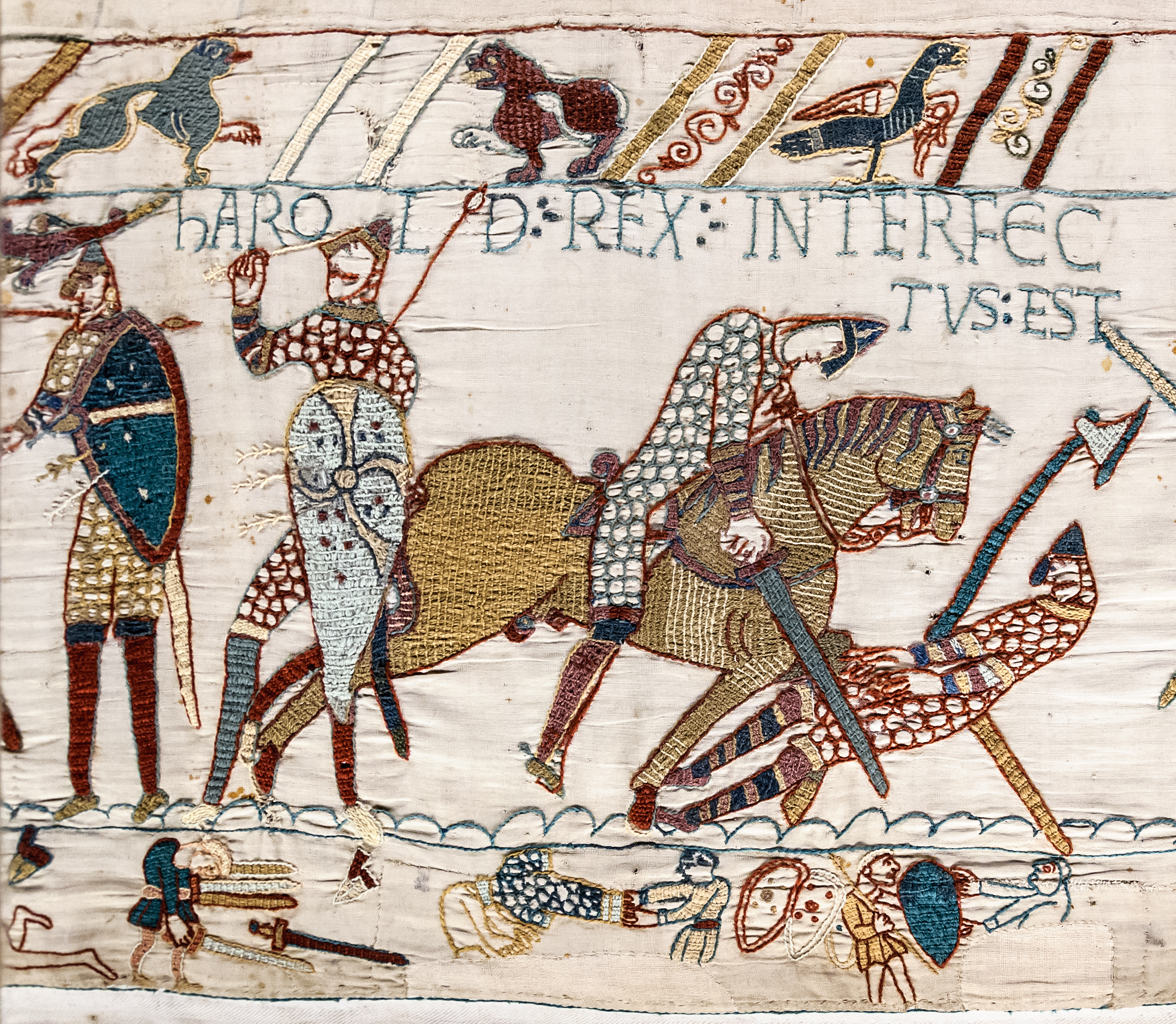
Harold's death. Legend above: (Hic) Harold rex interfectus est, "[Here] King Harold was killed"

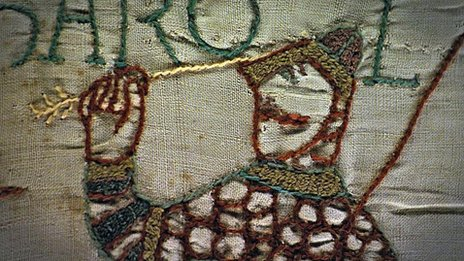
Detail of the arrow in Harold's eye

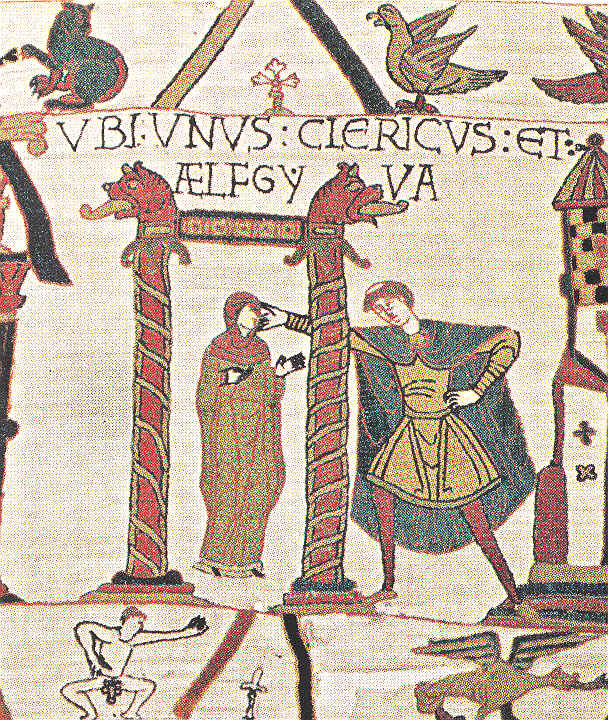
Detail of the legend ubi unus clericus et Ælfgyva

The depiction of events on the tapestry has raised several questions which remain unsettled.

The identification of Harold II of England in the vignette depicting his death is disputed. Some recent historians disagree with the traditional view that Harold is the figure struck in the eye with an arrow, and that the arrow is a later 18th/19th century modification following a period of repair. Benoît's engraving of 1729, and Bernard de Montfaucon's engravings of the tapestry as it was in 1730, show a spear or lance in place of the arrow and no arrow fletchings. Further, needle holes in the linen suggest that something has been removed, or shortened, and fletchings added to form an arrow. A figure is slain with a sword in the subsequent plate, and the phrase above the figure refers to Harold's death (interfectus est, "he was killed").

This would appear to be more consistent with the labelling used elsewhere in the work. It was common medieval iconography that a perjurer was to die with a weapon through the eye. Therefore, the tapestry might be said to emphasise William's rightful claim to the throne by depicting Harold as an oath breaker. Whether he actually died in this way remains a mystery and is much debated.

There is a panel with what appears to be a clergyman touching or possibly striking a woman's face. No one knows the significance of this scene or the caption above it: ubi unus clericus et Ælfgyva ("where [or in which] a certain cleric and Ælfgyva"), where Ælfgyva is the Latinised spelling of Ælfgifu, a popular Anglo-Saxon woman's name (literally "elf-gift"). The use of the grapheme Æ shows familiarity with English spelling. There are two naked male figures in the border below this figure; the one directly below the figure is in a pose mirroring that of the cleric, squatting and displaying his genitalia (a scene that was frequently censored in historical reproductions). However, similar naked figures appear elsewhere in the lower border where there seems to be no connection at all with the main action.

Harold had a younger sister named Ælfgifu (her name is spelt Alveva in the Domesday Book of 1086) who was possibly promised to William by Harold or even betrothed to him, but she died c. 1066, prior to the invasion. Ælfgifu of Northampton, however, was the mother of Sweyn Knutsson and Harold Harefoot, past kings of Denmark and England respectively, via Cnut the Great. It has been speculated that this scene, occurring after the meeting of Harold and William, is to remind the contemporary viewers of a scandal that occurred between Ælfgifu of Northampton and Emma of Normandy, Cnut's wives, that eventually led to the crowning of Edward the Confessor, child of Emma and her first husband, Æthelred the Unready.

At least two panels of the tapestry are missing, perhaps even another 6.4 m (7.0 yd) in total. This missing area may have depicted William's coronation as King of England. A poem by Baldric of Dol describes a tapestry on the walls of the personal apartments of Adela of Normandy, which is very similar to the Bayeux depiction. He describes the closing scene as the coronation of William in London.

== Historical accuracy ==
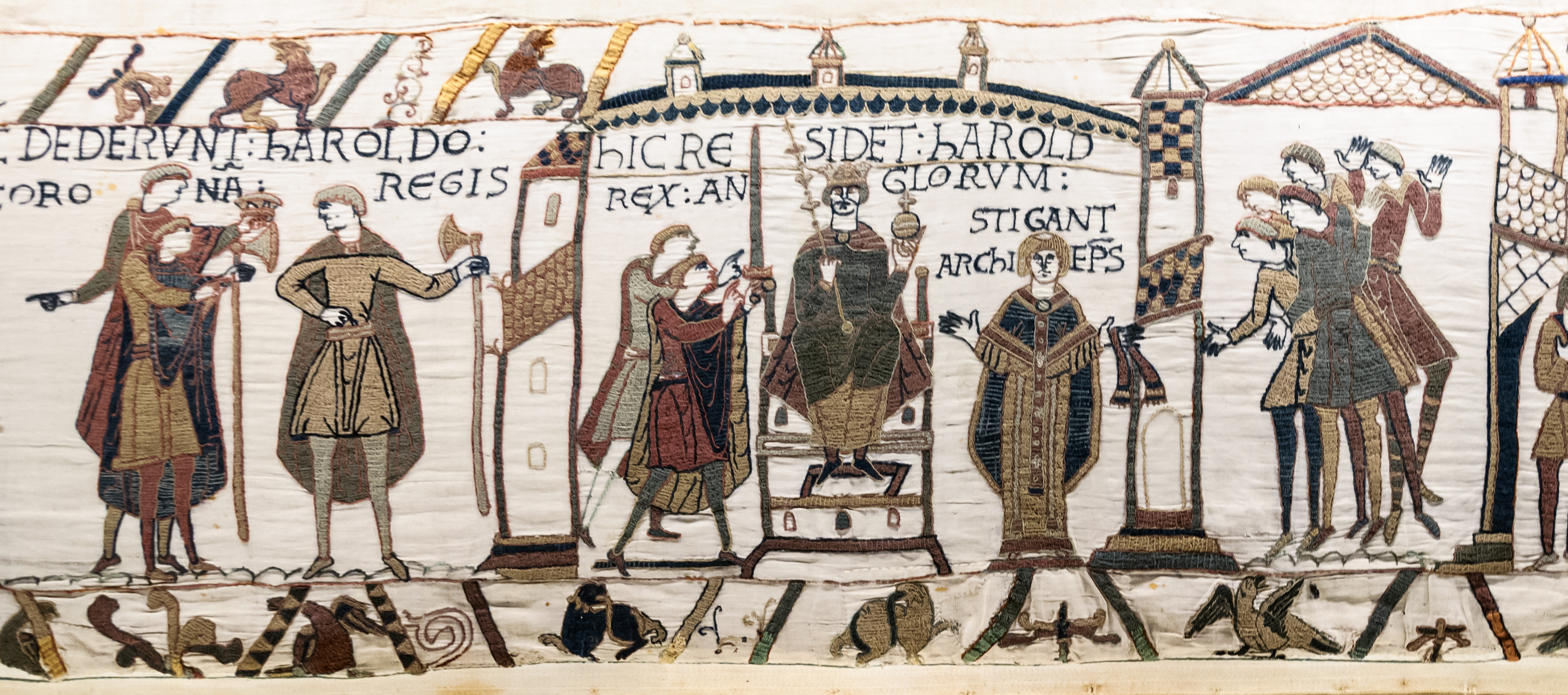
The coronation of Harold, seemingly by Archbishop Stigand

The Bayeux Tapestry was probably commissioned by the House of Normandy and essentially depicts a Norman viewpoint. However, Harold is shown as brave, and his soldiers are not belittled. Throughout, William is described as dux ("duke"), whereas Harold, also called dux up to his coronation, is subsequently called rex ("king"). The fact that the narrative extensively covers Harold's activities in Normandy (in 1064) indicates that the intention was to show a strong relationship between that expedition and the Norman Conquest starting two years later. It is for this reason that the tapestry is generally seen by modern scholars as an apologia for the Norman Conquest.

The tapestry's narration seems to place stress on Harold's oath to William, although its rationale is not made clear. Norman sources say that the English succession was being pledged to William, but English sources give varied accounts. Today it is thought that the Norman sources are to be preferred. Both the tapestry and Norman sources name Stigand, the excommunicated archbishop of Canterbury, as the man who crowned Harold, possibly to discredit Harold's kingship; one English source suggests that he was crowned by Ealdred, archbishop of York, and favoured by the papacy, making Harold's position as legitimate king more secure. Contemporary scholarship has not decided the matter, although it is generally thought that Ealdred performed the coronation.

The American historian Stephen D. White, in a study of the tapestry, has "cautioned against reading it as an English or Norman story, showing how the animal fables visible in the borders may instead offer a commentary on the dangers of conflict and the futility of pursuing power". He contends that many of the embroidered scenes allude directly to well-understood stories from Aesop's Fables (in Phaedrus's adaptations), interpreting the conquest in terms of predation, deceit and betrayal.

Although political propaganda or personal emphasis may have somewhat distorted the historical accuracy of the story, the Bayeux Tapestry constitutes a visual record of medieval arms, apparel, and other objects unlike any other artifact surviving from this period. There is no attempt at continuity between scenes, either in individuals' appearance or clothing. The knights carry shields, but show no system of hereditary coats of arms—the beginnings of modern heraldic structure were in place, but would not become standard until the middle of the 12th century. It has been noted that the warriors are depicted fighting with bare hands, while other sources indicate the general use of gloves in battle and hunt.

== Replicas and continuations ==
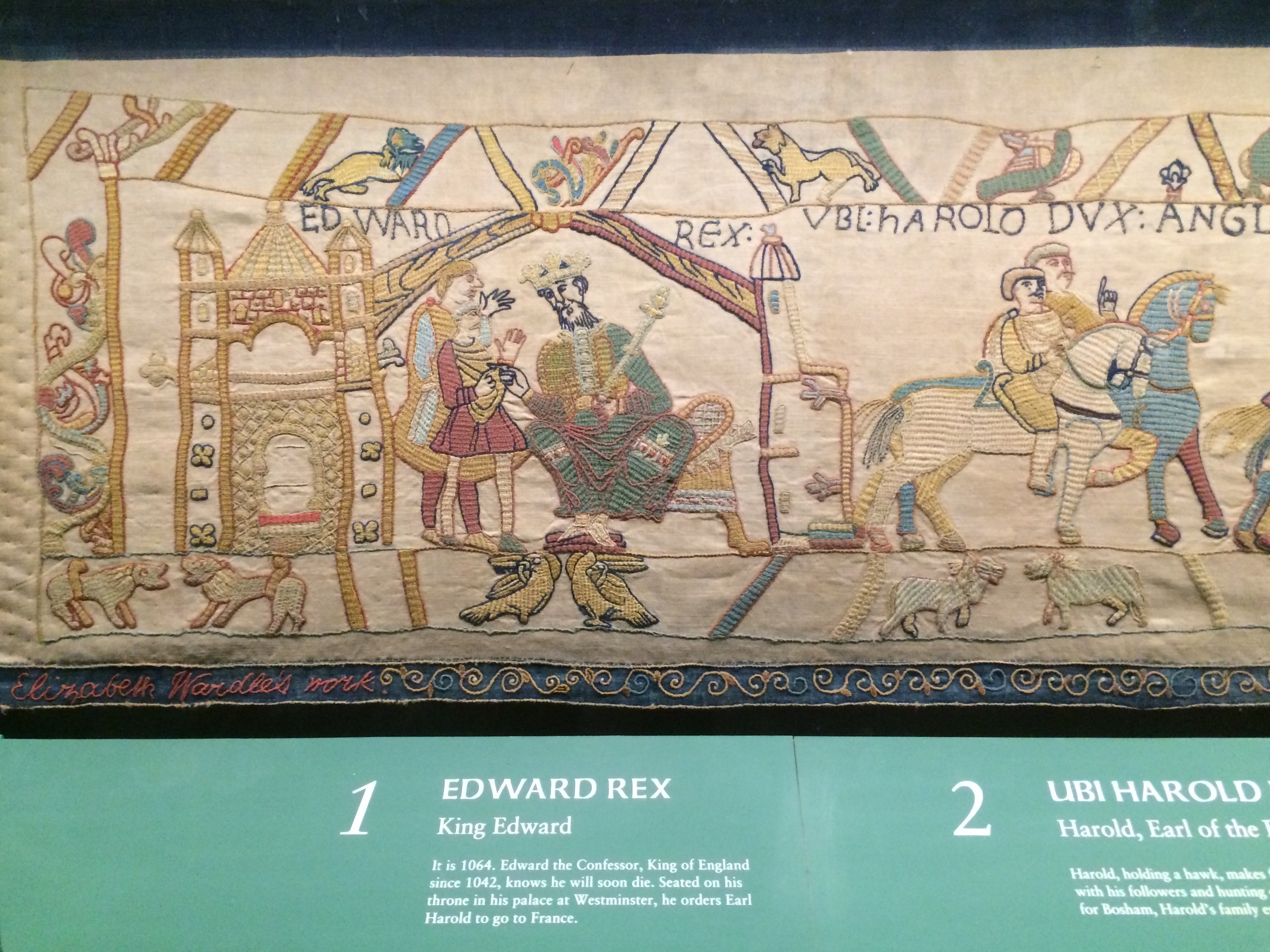
Start of the Bayeux Tapestry replica in Reading Museum, Berkshire

A number of replicas of the Bayeux Tapestry have been created, in various media.

- Through the collaboration of William Morris with textile manufacturer Thomas Wardle, Wardle's wife Elizabeth, who was an accomplished seamstress, embarked on creating a reproduction in 1885. She organised some 37 women in her Leek School of Art Embroidery to collaborate working from a full-scale water-colour facsimile drawing provided by the South Kensington Museum. The full-size replica was finished in 1886 and is now exhibited in Reading Museum in Reading, Berkshire, England. The naked figure in the original tapestry (in the border below the Ælfgyva figure) is depicted wearing a brief garment because the drawing which was worked from was similarly bowdlerised. The replica was digitised and made available online in 2020.
- Ray Dugan of University of Waterloo, Ontario, Canada, completed a stitched replica in 1996. Since its completion, it has been displayed in various museums and galleries in Canada and the United States.
- In 2000, a Danish association, Vikingegruppen Lindholm Høje, began making a replica of the Bayeux Tapestry using the original sewing techniques. The replica was completed in June 2014 and went on permanent exhibition at Børglum Abbey in May 2015.
- E. D. Wheeler, former judge and former dean at Oglethorpe University, commissioned a hand-painted, full-size replica of the Bayeux Tapestry completed by Margaret ReVille and donated it to the University of West Georgia in Carrollton in 1994. In 2014, the replica was acquired by the University of North Georgia in Dahlonega.

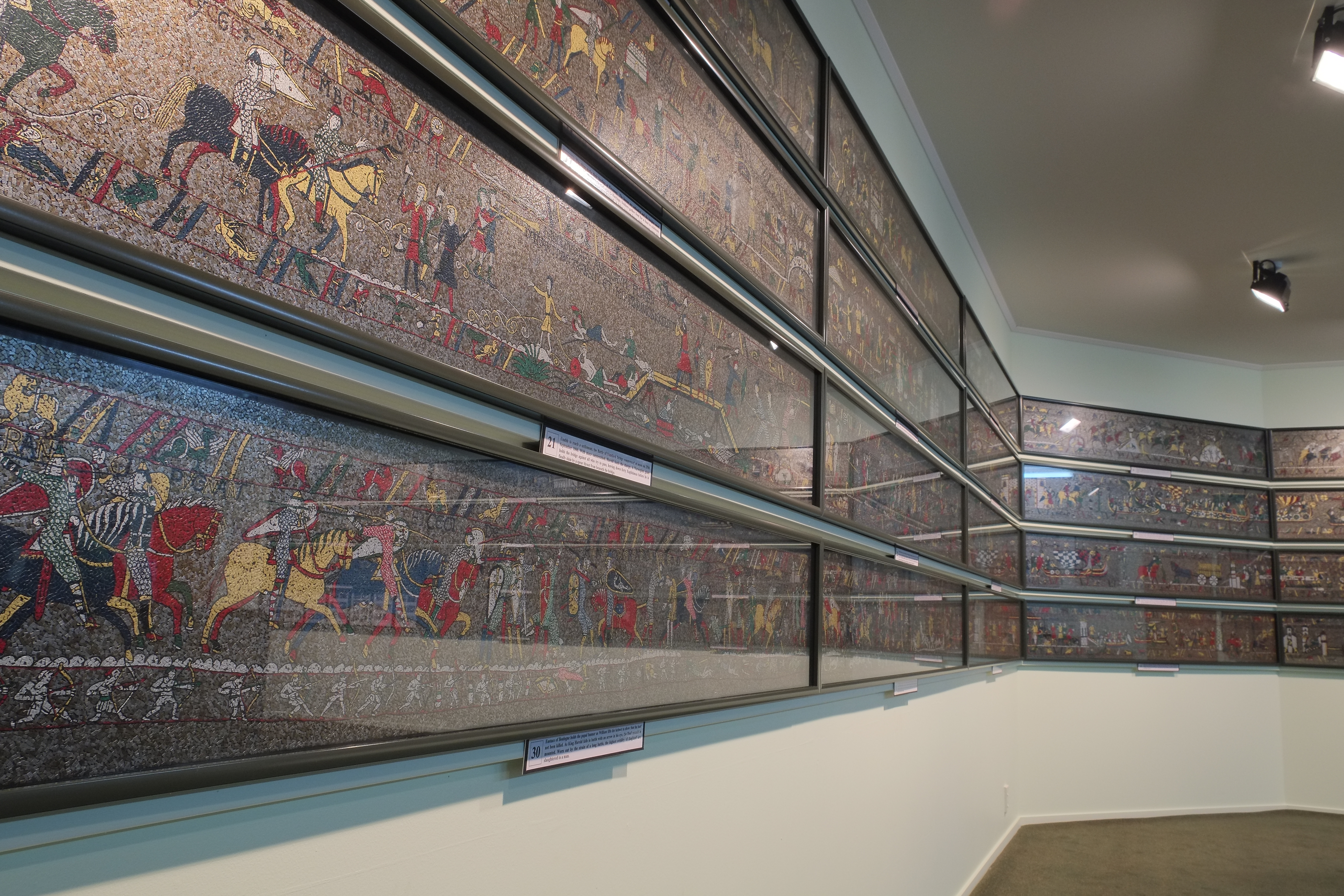
Sections of the 1066 Medieval Mosaic re-creation in New Zealand

- An approximately half-scale mosaic version of the Bayeux Tapestry was formerly on display at Geraldine, New Zealand. It was made up of 1.5 million 7 mm^{2} pieces of spring steel—off-cuts from patterning disks of knitting machines—and was created by Michael Linton over a period of twenty years from 1979. The work was in 32 sections, and included a hypothetical reconstruction of the missing final section leading up to William the Conqueror's coronation at Westminster Abbey on Christmas Day, 1066.
- Jason Welch, a woodcarver from North Creake, Norfolk, England, created a replica of the tapestry between 2011 and 2014 in carved and painted wooden relief on 25 five-foot planks. He undertook the project to help cope with the grief of losing his 18-year-old son.
- Mia Hansson, from Skanör, Sweden, living in Wisbech, Isle of Ely, Cambridgeshire, started a reproduction on 13 July 2016. As of May 2023 she had completed 40 metres (130 ft), saying that she expected to finish in some four years. Hansson takes part of her replica out for talk and display events. In September 2020 she published Mia's Bayeux Tapestry Colouring Book, with hand-drawn images from the tapestry.
- In January 2024, the Bayeux Museum acquired a Victorian replica of the Bayeux Tapestry as part of the late Rolling Stones drummer Charlie Watts's estate auction, purchased for £16,000. The replica, one of three known surviving Victorian copies, was originally created as a panoramic photograph in the 19th century.
- A version of the tapestry made entirely in needle lace was created as a table runner. It is over 30 feet (9.1 m) long and 4 feet (1.2 m) wide and it is stored in the Smithsonian archives. The origins and creators of this large piece were unknown for many years, but new information connected the work to the company Melville & Ziffer. The work was displayed at a Paris exhibition in 1906.

Other modern artists have attempted to complete the work by creating panels depicting subsequent events up to William's coronation, though the actual content of the missing panels is unknown. In 1997, the embroidery artist Jan Messent completed a reconstruction showing William accepting the surrender of English nobles at Berkhamsted (Beorcham), Hertfordshire, and his coronation. In early 2013, 416 residents of Alderney in the Channel Islands finished a continuation including William's coronation and the building of the Tower of London.

== In popular culture ==
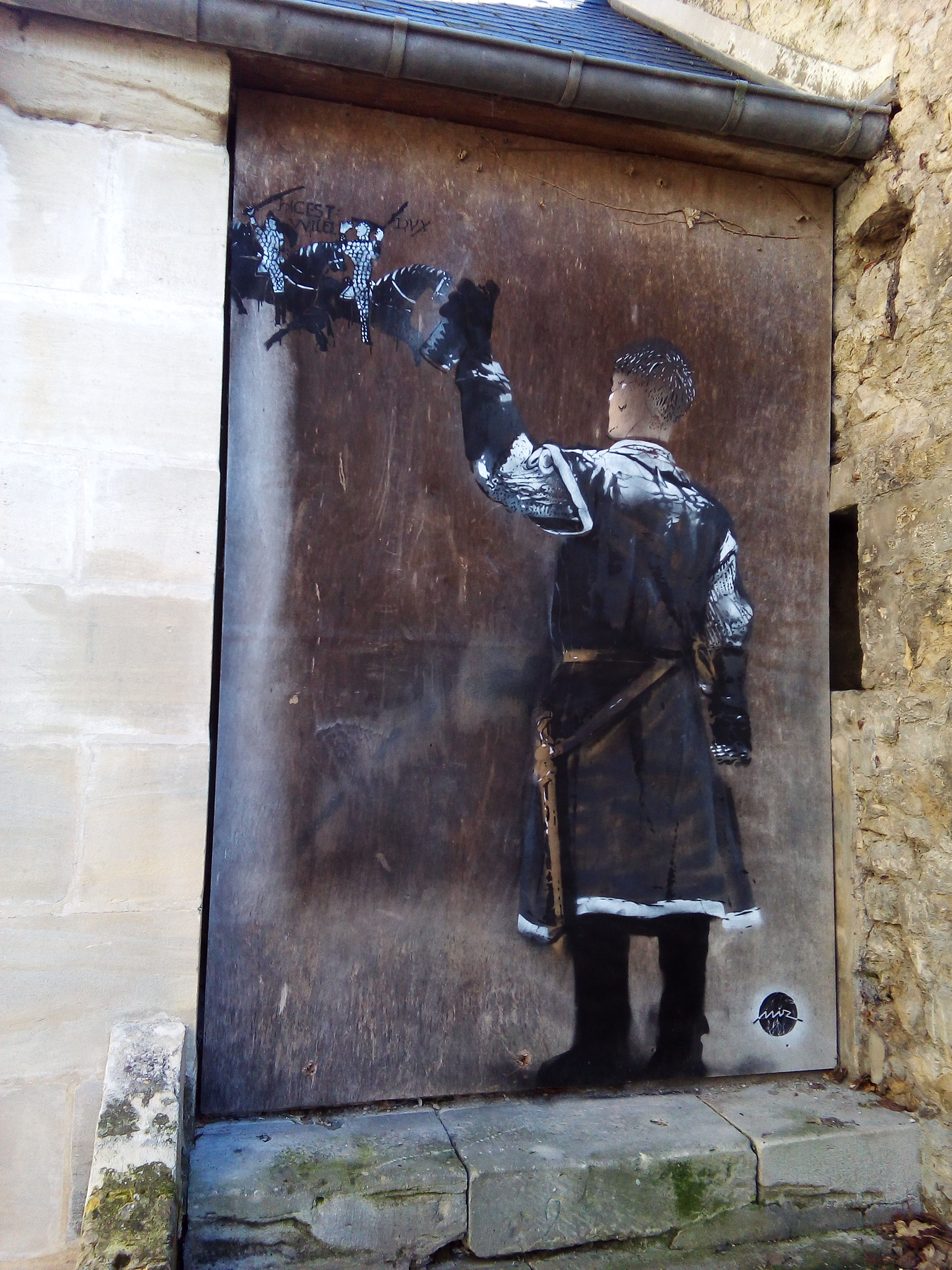
Street art in Bayeux, Normandy, imagining the tapestry being spray-painted by a Norman soldier

Because modern comic strips or movie storyboards resemble the Bayeux Tapestry, and it is widely recognised and is so distinctive in its artistic style, it has frequently been used or reimagined in a variety of different popular culture contexts. George Wingfield Digby wrote in 1957:

It was designed to tell a story to a largely illiterate public; it is like a strip cartoon, racy, emphatic, colourful, with a good deal of blood and thunder and some ribaldry.

It has been cited by Scott McCloud in his 1993 book Understanding Comics as an example of early sequential-narrative art; and Bryan Talbot, a British comic book artist, has called it "the first known British comic strip".

It has inspired many modern political and other cartoons, including:

- John Hassall's satirical pastiche Ye Berlyn Tapestrie, published in 1915, which tells the story of the German invasion of Belgium in August 1914
- Rea Irvin's cover for the New Yorker magazine of 15 July 1944 marking D-Day
- George Gale's pastiche chronicling the saga leading up to Britain's entry into the European Economic Community, published across six pages in The Times's "Europa" supplement on 1 January 1973

Roy Lichtenstein's 29-metre (95 ft) Green Street Mural (1983) was inspired by the Bayeux Tapestry.

The tapestry has inspired modern embroideries, most notably and directly:

- The Overlord Embroidery (1974), commemorating Operation Overlord and the Normandy landings of 1944, now at Portsmouth
- The Prestonpans Tapestry (2010), which chronicles the events surrounding the Battle of Prestonpans in 1745
- The Black Gold Tapestry (2017), by Sandra Sawatzky, depicting 5000 years of the history of oil

Other embroideries more loosely inspired by it include the Hastings Embroidery (1966), the New World Tapestry (1980–2000), the Quaker Tapestry (1981–1989), the Great Tapestry of Scotland (2013), the Scottish Diaspora Tapestry (2014–15), Magna Carta (An Embroidery) (2014–15), and (in this case a woven tapestry with embroidered details) the Game of Thrones Tapestry (2017–2019).

Japanese anime director Hayao Miyazaki was inspired by the tapestry during the creation of his manga and film Nausicaä of the Valley of the Wind (1984). The legendary tapestry tells the story of a chosen one who will save the earth.

A number of films have used sections of the tapestry in their opening credits or closing titles, including Anthony Mann's El Cid, Franco Zeffirelli's Hamlet, Frank Cassenti's La Chanson de Roland, Kevin Reynolds' Robin Hood: Prince of Thieves, and Richard Fleischer's The Vikings. Disney's musical film Bedknobs and Broomsticks notably does not feature photography of the actual historic work, but instead opens with a stylized scrolling sequence that loosely chronicles the general plot of that musical in an imaginative and whimsical style (accompanied by an overture that draws on medieval tropes and folk-inspired constructions from Great Britain).

The tapestry is referred to in Tony Kushner's 1991 play Angels in America. The apocryphal account of Queen Matilda's creation of the tapestry is used, perhaps in order to demonstrate that Louis, one of the main characters, holds himself to mythological standards.

The couch gag for the 2008 The Simpsons episode "E Pluribus Wiggum" retells the eponymous family's struggle with their neighbour Ned Flanders in the style of the tapestry.

In 2022 the French documentary Mysteries of the Bayeux Tapestry was broadcast by BBC Four. It was written by Jonas Rosales, directed by Alexis de Favitski and produced by Antoine Bamas. The documentary covered investigations carried out on the tapestry by the Laboratoire d'Archéologie Moléculaire et Structurale (LAMS) at the French National Centre for Scientific Research, which used a hyperspectral camera, measuring 215 different colours, to analyse the pigments which produced the original colours for the dyes, extracted from madder, weld and indigo.

In 2025 Bethesda Softworks commissioned a remake of the Bayeux Tapestry as part of a promotional campaign for their video game Doom: The Dark Ages. The tapestry, dubbed the Slayeux Tapestry, was displayed in the Royal Armouries Museum in Leeds.

In 2026 while the tapestry was on loan to the British Museum, the UK Conservative Party conference included a "Birmingham Tapestry" depicting Kemi Badenoch, the "turncoat" Robert Jenrick, and other politicians.
