= Ancestry of the Godwins =

Ancestry of a noble family

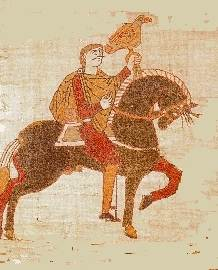
King Harold depicted on the Bayeux Tapestry

Very little is known for certain of the ancestry of the Godwins, the family of the last Anglo-Saxon king of England, Harold II. When King Edward the Confessor died in January 1066, his closest relative was his great-nephew Edgar the Ætheling, but he was young and lacked powerful supporters. Harold was the head of the most powerful family in England and Edward's brother-in-law, and he became king. In September 1066, Harold defeated and killed King Harald Hardrada of Norway at the Battle of Stamford Bridge, and Harold was himself defeated and killed the following month by William the Conqueror at the Battle of Hastings.

The family is named after Harold's father, Earl Godwin, who had risen to a position of wealth and influence in the 1020s under Danish King Cnut the Great. In 1045, Godwin's daughter Edith married King Edward the Confessor; by the mid-1050s, Harold and his brothers had become dominant, almost monopolising the English earldoms. Godwin's origin is obscure. He was probably the son of Wulfnoth Cild, a South Saxon thegn, but Wulfnoth's ancestry is disputed. A few genealogists and historians argue that he was descended from Alfred the Great's elder brother, King Æthelred I (865–71), but almost all historians of Anglo-Saxon England reject this theory.

== Background ==
Earl Godwin is probably first recorded in 1014, when Godwin, son of Wulfnoth, was left land at a place called Compton in the will of King Æthelred the Unready's son Æthelstan Ætheling. As Earl Godwin was later recorded as holding land at Compton in Sussex it is likely that he was the Godwin mentioned in Æthelstan Ætheling's will. Historians think that he was probably the son of the outlawed South Saxon thegn Wulfnoth Cild. In 1009 Wulfnoth was accused of unknown crimes at a muster of King Æthelred's fleet, and fled with twenty ships; a force sent in pursuit was destroyed in a storm.

According to the twelfth-century chronicler John of Worcester, Godwin was the son of a Wulfnoth who was the son of Æthelmær, brother of Eadric Streona, both sons of an otherwise unknown Æthelric, but in the view of the historian Ann Williams this is chronologically impossible. If the relationship were true, the pedigree would result in a significant generational displacement, with two children of Æthelred the Unready marrying the son and great-great-granddaughter of Æthelric. Æthelred's daughter Eadgyth married Æthelric's son Eadric Streona, while Eadgyth's half-brother Edward the Confessor married Godwin's daughter Edith. If Godwin was Æthelric's great-grandson, then Edith was his great-great-granddaughter. David Kelley, however, argues that Edward, being a child of a later marriage, could have been almost a generation younger than his sister, and if both he and Eadric married much younger wives and if Eadric was among the youngest brothers of Æthelmær, this could close up the chronological differences. John of Worcester also stated that Wulfnoth's rebellion was provoked by unjust charges brought by Eadric Streona's brother, Brihtric.

The Life of Edward the Confessor, commissioned by his widow Edith, who was Harold's sister, is silent on her family's origin. In a section designed to eulogise her family, Godwin is described as "blessed in his ancestral stock", but nothing further is said of this stock. In the view of the historian Frank Barlow: "There is massive evasion here." Historians generally discount a later medieval tradition that he was the son of a churl or a farmer. In her Oxford Dictionary of National Biography (ODNB) article on Godwin's son, King Harold Godwinson, Robin Fleming says of Godwin: "The origins of this parvenu are extremely obscure." He was "the quintessential new man". However, Williams says that the Anglo-Saxon Chronicle's reference to "Wulfnoth cild the South Saxon" implies a man of rank (cild means child, young man, warrior); his ability to detach twenty ships from the royal fleet suggests a man of at least local importance. Frank Barlow goes further, arguing that Godwin must have been of aristocratic origin, and that the family's massive land holdings in Sussex are indisputable evidence that the Wulfnoth who was Godwin's father was the Saxon thegn.

== Æthelred I theory ==
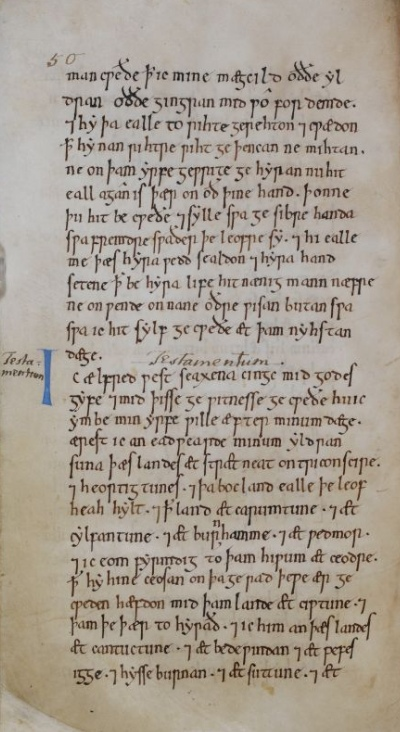
Will of Alfred the Great, AD 873–888 (11th-century copy, British Library Stowe MS 944, ff. 29v–33r)

A few scholars have put forward a genealogical reconstruction making the Godwins descend from Alfred the Great's elder brother, King Æthelred I of Wessex. The theory was first proposed by the historian Alfred Anscombe in 1913, and advocated by the genealogist Lundie W. Barlow in 1957 and the Mayanist scholar and genealogist David H. Kelley in 1989.

The theory depends in part on tracing the ownership of certain estates, especially Compton in West Sussex, which was probably the Compton left to Æthelred's son Æthelhelm in Alfred the Great's will. It was later in the possession of Wulfnoth, presumably confiscated after his rebellion, and left to "Godwin, Wulfnoth's son" in 1014 in Æthelstan Ætheling's will. Immediately before the bequest to Godwin is one to an "Ælmære". Calling him Ælmær, Anscombe identifies this legatee as Ealdorman Æthelmær the Stout, in his view the father of Wulfnoth Cild. He supports this relationship with two further arguments. He finds significance in the occurrence in documents of an Æthelmær with the same epithet as Wulfnoth, Cild, though another advocate of the theory, Lundie Barlow, found Anscombe's Cild argument "untenable". Anscombe also cites in support of his thesis John of Worcester's pedigree showing Godwin's father Wulfnoth as son of Agelmær, a brother of Eadric Streona. Though the Worcester chronicler gives his Agelmær a different father from the known father of Ealdorman Æthelmær, and Anscombe points out its inherent chronological problems, he argues that, though flawed, the pedigree retains the memory of a father-son relationship between Æthelmær the Stout and Wulfnoth Cild. Æthelmær was the son of the late tenth-century chronicler and ealdorman Æthelweard, whose own writings record that he was descended from Æthelred I, although the exact nature of this descent has been debated.

In his 2002 book The Godwins, Frank Barlow sympathetically examined the arguments put forward by Anscombe and Lundie Barlow. He included a family tree based on their work, showing Godwin's descent from Æthelred I, and at one point described Wulfnoth Cild as the son of Æthelmær the Stout. Elsewhere he was more cautious, describing Wulfnoth as the probable son of Æthelmær, and questioning whether a family which had used names for seven generations almost all starting with Æthel- or Ælf- would suddenly have thrown up a Wulfnoth, particularly as Æthelmær the Stout's known sons continued the tradition. He stated nevertheless that "This pedigree, even if mistaken, is of the right type."

Frank Barlow is almost alone among modern scholars in taking the theory seriously. Peter Rex, in his biography of Harold, describes Godwin as one of Cnut's new men, and dismisses claims that the family had aristocratic ancestry. Emma Mason, in her history of the Godwin family, describes Wulfnoth as a mystery man who was probably a minor figure at court in the late tenth century, and Ian Walker in his biography of Harold gives a similar description of Wulfnoth as "a relatively minor figure who attended court only infrequently". Williams in her ODNB article on Godwin, and Robin Fleming in her ODNB article on Harold, do not mention the theory when discussing Godwin's ancestry, and according to Stenton: "Of his origin nothing can be said with any assurance."

== Succession to the throne ==
Even if Harold was descended from Æthelred I, it would not have given him a hereditary claim to the throne according to the rules of royal succession in later Anglo-Saxon England. Eligibility was confined to æthelings, that is throne-worthy princes of the royal house. In earlier Anglo-Saxon times, eligibility depended on descent from the fifth- or sixth-century founder of each kingdom, but it later became more restricted. According to David Dumville: "The Anglo-Saxon ætheling in the period from the ninth-century Scandinavian settlements to the Norman Conquest was a prince of the royal house. He shared with the reigning king descent from a common grandfather at least". All known West Saxon æthelings after 900 were the sons of kings except for Harold's rival for the throne in 1066, Edgar the Ætheling, who was the grandson of King Edmund Ironside. Edgar was thus an ætheling according to Dumville's definition, but in the view of Pauline Stafford, only the son of a present or former king could be an ætheling, and when Edward the Confessor gave this designation to his great-nephew Edgar, it was a form of adoption without known recent precedent, because for the first time since the beginning of the ninth century there was no living ætheling in the strict sense of a son of a king.

== Danish ancestry ==
Godwin's wife, and the mother of his children including Harold and Edith, was Gytha Thorkelsdóttir. Her father was Thorgils Sprakaleg, a Dane whose origin is unknown, although he was probably a Dane from Scania, which was then in Denmark but is now part of Sweden. Gytha was very well connected as her brother Ulf married King Cnut's sister Estrith. Cnut probably arranged the marriage between Godwin and Gytha in about 1022.

== Sources ==
- Anscombe, Alfred (1913). "The Pedigree of Earl Godwine". Transactions of the Royal Historical Society. 3. 7: 129–50. doi:10.2307/3678418. JSTOR 3678418.
- Barlow, Frank (2002). The Godwins:The Rise and Fall of a Noble Dynasty. Pearson Longman. ISBN 978-0-582-78440-6.
- Barlow, Lundie W. (1957). "The Antecedents of Earl Godwine of Wessex". New England Historical and Genealogical Register. 111: 30–38.
- Dumville, David (1979). "The ætheling, a study in Anglo-Saxon constitutional history". Anglo-Saxon England. 8: 1–33. doi:10.1017/S026367510000301X. ISSN 0263-6751. S2CID 159954001.
- Fleming, Robin (2004). "Harold II [Harold Godwineson] (1022/3?–1066), king of England". Oxford Dictionary of National Biography. Oxford University Press. doi:10.1093/ref:odnb/12360. ISBN 978-0-19-861412-8. (subscription, Wikipedia Library access or UK public library membership required)
- Hunt, William (1890). "Godwin (d.1053)" . In Stephen, Leslie; Lee, Sidney (eds.). Dictionary of National Biography. Vol. 22. London: Smith, Elder & Co. pp. 50–55.
- Kelley, David H. (1989). "The House of Aethelred". In Brook, L. L. (ed.). Studies in Genealogy and Family History. Tribute to Charles Evans on the Occasion of his 80th Birthday. Foundation for Medieval Genealogy. pp. 63–93. OCLC 22235011.
- Keynes, Simon; Lapidge, Michael, eds. (1983). Alfred the Great: Asser's Life of King Alfred & Other Contemporary Sources. Penguin Classics. ISBN 978-0-14-044409-4.
- Mason, Emma (2004). The House of Godwine: The History of a Dynasty. London, UK: Hambledon and London. ISBN 1-85285-389-1.
- Rex, Peter (2005). Harold II: The Doomed Saxon King. Stroud, UK: Tempus. ISBN 0-7524-3529-9.
- Smyth, Alfred P. (1995). King Alfred the Great. Oxford, UK: Oxford University Press. ISBN 0-19-822989-5.
- Stafford, Pauline (2001). Queen Emma and Queen Edith. Blackwell. ISBN 978-0-631-16679-5.
- Stenton, Frank M. (1971). Anglo-Saxon England. Oxford: Clarendon Press. ISBN 978-0-19-280139-5.
- Walker, Ian W. (1997). Harold: The Last Anglo-Saxon King. Stroud, UK: Sutton Publishing. ISBN 0-7509-2456-X.
- Williams, Ann (1999). Kingship and Government in Pre-Conquest England c.500-1066. Basingstoke, UK: Macmillan Press Ltd. ISBN 978-0-312-22090-7.
- Williams, Ann (2004). "Godwine [Godwin], earl of Wessex (d. 1053), magnate". Oxford Dictionary of National Biography. Oxford University Press. doi:10.1093/ref:odnb/56555. (subscription, Wikipedia Library access or UK public library membership required)
- Williams, Ann (2006). "The Family and Career of Harold II Godwineson, King of the English" (PDF). Paper read at Hokkai Gakuen University, Sapporo, Japan, on 21 November 2006. Hokuga.
- Yorke, Barbara (2001). "Edward as Ætheling". In Higham, N. J.; Hill, D. H. (eds.). Edward the Elder 899–924. Abingdon, UK: Routledge. ISBN 0-415-21497-1.
