= Godwinson =

Godwinson is a surname. Notable people with this surname include:

- Children of Godwin, Earl of Wessex:

- Gyrth Godwinson (c. 1032–1066)
- Harold Godwinson (c. 1022–1066), king of England
- Leofwine Godwinson (c. 1035–1066)
- Sweyn Godwinson (c. 1020–1052)
- Tostig Godwinson (c. 1029–1066)
- Wulfnoth Godwinson (1040–1094)
