= Vita Ædwardi Regis =

11th-century Latin biography of Edward the Confessor

Vita Ædwardi Regis qui apud Westmonasterium Requiescit
- The Life of King Edward who Rests at Westminster
- The first page of the only known copy of the Vita.
- Author(s): Anonymous
- Patron: Edith, Queen-consort of England
- Language: Latin
- Date: c. 1065–1067
- Provenance: unclear
- Authenticity: likely authentic transcription of the earlier source
- Principal manuscript(s): British Library Harley MS 526
- Genre: Historical narrative (book i); poetry (book i); hagiography (book ii)
- Subject: The deeds of Godwine and his children (book i); the holiness of King Edward the Confessor (book ii)
- Period covered: 1020s–1066

The Vita Ædwardi Regis qui apud Westmonasterium Requiescit (English: Life of King Edward who rests at Westminster) or simply Vita Ædwardi Regis is a Latin biography of King Edward the Confessor completed by an anonymous author c. 1067 and suspected of having been commissioned by Queen Edith, Edward's wife. It survives in one manuscript, dated c. 1100, now in the British Library. The author is unknown, but was a servant of the queen and probably a Fleming. The most likely candidates are Goscelin and Folcard, monks of St Bertin Abbey in St Omer.

It is a two-part text, the first dealing with England in the decades before the Norman Conquest (1066) and the activities of the family of Godwin, Earl of Wessex, and the second dealing with the holiness of King Edward. It is likely that the two parts were originally distinct. The first book is a secular history, not hagiography, although book ii is more hagiographic and was used as the basis of later saints' lives dedicated to the king, such as those by Osbert of Clare and Aelred of Rievaulx. The Vita is very important to historians studying eleventh-century England, because it is one of the few good primary sources still available from the period. Also, it is a transitional piece, showing how England was more closely related to Scandinavia, and how after the Norman Conquest, it shifted south and became more connected to continental Europe, particularly France. The time of the Vita was a time when this crucial shift in England's history was taking place.

There are two modern English translations of the text, those of Henry Richards Luard (1858) and Frank Barlow (1962, 1992).

== Manuscripts ==
The Vita Ædwardi Regis survives in one manuscript, written in folios 38 to 57 of the British Library Harley MS 526, these twenty folios measuring c. 13 cm by 18.5 c and penned in "brownish ink". Written on the manuscript at a later date is the name of Richard Bancroft, Archbishop of Canterbury (1604–1610), who must therefore have acquired it. Its location prior to the life of Archbishop Bancroft is unclear, but possible locations include Canterbury itself, London Cathedral or the church of Westminster, as Bancroft had previously been a canon of Westminster as well as treasurer, prebendary and Bishop of London.

The Harley manuscript was probably written down at Christ Church, Canterbury around 1100, owing to the style of the hand. The two centre folios that originally lay between 40 and 41, and 54 and 55 are lost, though their content can be partially reconstructed. Its recent editor, historian Frank Barlow, thought that it was based on an earlier version of the text at Christ Church Canterbury by 1085; he also believed that other copies, now lost, existed at Westminster Abbey and Bury St Edmunds, from which derivative works were written.

== Text ==
The text tells the story of the life of King Edward the Confessor. It is written from the perspective of an anonymous author who receives inspiration from his Muse. The text is mostly Latin prose, but it is interspersed with bits of poetry, which the Muse tells the author to include so that his tale is not tiresome. The story goes from the Danish invasion and King Cnut up until the death of Edward, speaking mostly in a historical fashion, and then it backtracks and returns to Edward's life, telling of the miracles he performed and his saintliness. Besides Edward himself, the main character of the story (particularly the historical part) is his wife, Edith of Wessex. The author explicitly states that he desires to write praise to Edith, and the Muse tells him also to write of the goodness of Edith's father, Earl Godwin, and his family.

The Vita is not particularly hagiographic, and is more comparable to works such as Asser's Vita Ælfredi (Life of King Alfred) or Einhard's Vita Karoli Magni (Life of Charlemagne) than to a saint's life. Frank Barlow thought its closest parallel was Vita Regis Rotberti Pii, a biographical narrative on the reign of Robert II the Pious, king of France, written sometime after 1031 by the Fleury monk Helgaud. Book i of the Vita Ædwardi Regis, the majority of the work, was not hagiographic at all. Osbert of Clare, who wrote the first true hagiography of King Edward, ignored book i and built his narrative around book ii. Book i is generally considered the more valuable section for modern historians. In the view of historian J. L. Grassi, it is the most valuable narrative source for the reign of Edward the Confessor, containing around 40 unique items of information. Book i is interspersed with poetry (largely absent from book ii), usually used as "transitional pieces" between different stages of the narrative.

As a source, the Vita was drawn on by later medieval writers. William of Malmesbury consulted it, and his Gesta Regum contains extracts, as does Osbert of Clare's Vita. Sulcard's Prologus de Construccione Westmonasterii, written c. 1085, makes use of the work too, and it is this that enables historians to theorise that a copy of the Vita was at the Abbey of Westminster by this date. More use of the text, if indirect, was made by the famous Cistercian Northumbrian, Aelred of Rievaulx. Ailred's Vita S. Eduardi Regis et Confessoris was the most widely circulated hagiography of Edward, and all later accounts of Edward's miracles and life are based on this. Book iv of Richard of Cirencester's Speculum Historiale de Gestis Regum Angliae is a compilation based on the Vita by Aelred, and contains extracts of the Vita Ædwardi Regis, some of which – roughly 500 words regarding Edith's marriage to Edward – are unique and probably represent part of the lost sections of the original Vita Ædwardi Regis.

== Context ==
After King Edward died on 5 January 1066, Harold Godwinson was crowned king of England, and there were multiple threats poised against England from different sides. There was Duke William of Normandy, who claimed to have been promised the crown by Edward and even by Harold himself. There was Tostig, the former earl of Northumbria, who had been banished from the kingdom.

The most important political dynamic in England in the years before the Vita was written was the climb to power by the Godwin family, and the struggle between the Godwins and King Edward. The Vita and other sources tell of the struggles between Earl Godwin and the king, and while these conflicts took many forms (such as the ownership of land, or question of Godwin's involvement in the murder of Edward's brother), the basis behind them all was the struggle for power. Edward was the king, but Godwin clearly desired for his family to rule the kingdom, with his sons as the major earls, and his daughter as the queen. This did not always sit well with Edward, which led to the banishment of the Godwins (including the removal of Edith as queen) in 1051. Interestingly enough, the popular opinion in England seems to have been on Godwin's side more than Edward's, since there was nothing Edward could do to stop his return from exile, since the earl's forces were stronger than his own and the people were with him. The Vita says no less than five times that Godwin was viewed by the whole kingdom as its father, and while there is surely some exaggeration here, it shows an immense amount of support that he had among the English. This makes logical sense, considering that they elected Godwin's son, Harold, to be king when Edward died without an heir. There is no evidence to suggest that there was any internal opposition to Harold's rule.

The Vita claims that Edward gave the kingship of England to Harold with his dying words. However, there is no definitive proof that this was the case. Marc Morris says this claim is shaky, but cannot be completely refuted, since the pro-Godwin sources of the period say the story is true—albeit cautiously—and even the anti-Godwin sources such as William of Poitiers do not attempt to deny it. Stephen Baxter suggest that Edward might have changed his own mind about the succession of the throne multiple times, leading to the uncertainty surrounding Harold's, William's and Edgar Ætheling's claims. Either way, Harold was clearly intent on becoming king, as his seeming eagerness to be crowned immediately after Edward's death indicates, especially since that was not common practice among the English at the time. We do not know if Harold desired to seize the crown and made up Edward's request as an excuse, or if the Vita and the Bayeux Tapestry tell the truth in saying that he was nominated by Edward and elected by the English witan of their own volition. The most likely answer is that the truth is some combination of the two.

The threats to Harold's rule were exclusively external. The primary one was William. William claimed that Edward had promised the throne to him, and the Bayeux Tapestry shows Harold in Normandy, swearing an oath on holy relics that he would let William be king. There is little disagreement in primary sources that this oath was in fact sworn, but there are differences of opinion on why. Sources with a more Norman leaning say that Harold had gone to Normandy with the purpose of making the oath, while English sources claim that the oath—or possibly the entire trip—had not been planned. The Vita itself does not say anything on the matter. Either way, William was a contender to the English throne, and likely many people in England (id est, most people who were involved in the workings of government) would have known that William would not be easily ignored. Matters would come to a head with him sooner or later, as they in the autumn when he invaded.

The other challenge to the throne came from Harold's own brother, Tostig. If the knowledge of William and his claim to the throne was known in England, the knowledge of Tostig and his grievance with his family would have been known even better. He had been the earl of Northumbria, but due to a rebellion of his people, he was expelled while Edward was king and Harold was the earl of Wessex. Tostig was a harsh ruler, and his people did not love him. The Vita itself—though it usually takes a stance favorable to Tostig—says that he was a little too harsh sometimes, and this is probably an understatement. The chief cause of the rebellion was likely Tostig's tax policy, which his subjects perceived to be too harsh, as well violence and cruelty to his people. He was also accused of robbing churches and conspiring to murder noblemen in his earldom. After Tostig was expelled, he remained bitter towards Harold, and it is not surprising that he would have desired to challenge his brother's throne. This challenge came in the form of allying with Harold Sigurdsson, king of Norway, and invading England, an attempt which was stopped at the Battle of Stamford Bridge, where Tostig died.

Shortly afterward, the Normans invaded from the south and William emerged from the Battle of Hastings as the victor. With Godwin's sons—Harold, Tostig, Gyrth, and Leofwine—all dead, he proceeded to become the king of England and subdue the rest of his new realm. This was a long and brutal process that felt to many in England like their entire world was coming undone. The previous power balance had been entirely upset, and many of the English saw the invasion as God's divine judgement for their sins.

== Dating ==
=== Historiography ===
Barlow argues that the first half of the book—the half dealing with Edward's reign and the doings of the house of Godwin—was written between 1065 and 1066, while the second half—in which the miracles of Edward are recounted—was most likely written around 1067. There have been a variety of suggestions proposed by other historians regarding the date of the Vita. Monika Otter and Tom Licence agree with Barlow that the text was started and finished on either side of the Battle of Hastings. One of the most extreme opinions on the date of the Vita was proposed by Marc Bloch in 1923. He said that the entire work was an early 12th century forgery. This view is not held by any current historians. Barlow dismisses Bloch's theory, saying that the single manuscript can be reliably dated to around AD 1100, and that it at least the earlier part of the text was in use in the 1080s. Likewise, J. L. Grassi says that whoever wrote the Vita clearly had access to inside and personal information about the king, and was probably even present at Edward's death.

=== Dating ===
The Vita was likely written between Edward's death in January 1066 and sometime after the Battle of Hastings, when William was subduing England. The work does not give us an exact date, but there are many clues in the text that indicate its rough date. The prose in the first half of the text is written with the benefit of hindsight regarding Edward's life. It flows consistently and only gives necessary details in one, consistent storyline. It goes from Godwin's preeminence in the reign of Cnut to his encouraging of the crowning of Edward. Then it tells of Edith, and how wonderful a wife she was to Edward. It deals with Robert of Jumièges's persuasion of Edward to exile Godwin and his family. Shortly afterward in the text, however, Godwin returns with the favor of the people and is reconciled. After Godwin's death, the text turns to Edward's good works, and the border wars of Harold and Tostig—especially the rise of Harold to replace his father. It talks of Tostig's troubles with his earldom of Northumbria, and his exile. This first part ends with Edward's death.

There is good reason to believe that the afore-described prose of the Vita was written after Edward's death, but before the Battle of Hastings. The consistency of the narrative is one thing. It appears to all have been written at roughly the same time, and with the same goal in mind. The text goes all the way to Edward's death, and its praise of the Godwin family—especially Edith and Harold—indicates that it was written at a time when those two were possibly the most influential people in England. Likewise, the text's scathing portrayal of Robert of Jumièges as an evil man would not have been written in Edward's lifetime, since he was a favorite of Edward. Tostig is portrayed sympathetically in the text, with author taking an almost conflicted tone, singing praise of Tostig, but also saying he was a bit too fierce in his punishment of evil. Likewise, after Tostig was exiled, the Vita says that his earldom fell into chaos. This does not seem like it was written after Tostig allied himself with the Norwegians and was defeated at Stamford bridge. Lastly, there is no mention of any threat from Normandy. The author did not have the hindsight of the Norman Conquest when he wrote this part of the text. Even Harold's visit to Normandy and oath to William are not recorded, indicating that perhaps the author did think them to be of great consequence.

The second major section of prose—dealing with Edward's miracles—is likely from after the Norman invasion. The reason is that it feels disjunct, as though it were forced on the text afterward. The earlier part of the text contains a full account of Edward's life (albeit, from a fairly Godwinist perspective) that ends with his death. Edward is portrayed as a wonderful man, but not as a miracle-working saint. Why did the author then go back and add a section about how holy Edward was? When the Normans ruled England, writing a book about Edward that focused on how fortunate he was to have the wonderful family of Godwins guiding him would have been a dangerous political move. By including a part about how Edward was truly a saint, the book could claim to be a saint's life, and perhaps its pro-Godwin perspective might be overlooked by the Norman conquerors.

The poetry of the Vita is a creature of its own. It is interspersed throughout the first part of the book, but it was probably added after the Norman Conquest. Many of the poems take on a grieving or doom-laden tone that is absent from the rest of the text. Even at the very beginning, the Vita says that all is ruined, and seeks his Muse for comfort for some unknown grief.The third poem in the work sings of the greatness of the house of Godwin, but then mourns its impending doom, when all shall be lost. Possibly the most heart-breaking poem in the work is the last one, which sits between the initial account of Edward's death and the stories of his miracles. In this poem, the author is more grieved than ever, saying that all is lost, the brothers have turned against each other, and a new and horrible people is in England.

== Authorship and patronage ==
=== Authorship ===
The author of the text is anonymous. Some things, however, are reasonably certain about the author. He was or had been in Holy Orders, either as monk or a clerk; he had been a servant of Queen Edith; and he was not English. It is highly unlikely that he was Norman, but rather Flemish or Lotharingian. Flemish is most likely, as he mentions St Omer and Baldwin V, Count of Flanders, intimately, the latter three times. His spelling of place-names resembles the orthography characteristic of areas speaking Continental Germanic languages. Barlow states that the most likely candidates to have authored the Vita are Goscelin and Folcard, two Flemish monks who lived in England in the early 11th century and wrote many saints' lives. The evidence for this stems partially from the fact that the author's disdain for certain elements about the English church indicate that he was a foreigner. There are equally strong stylistic and circumstantial claims for both Goscelin and Folcard, so according to Barlow, there is really no way of knowing which of the two wrote it, but it is extremely unlikely that anyone else would have written it.

Historians since have generally accepted Barlow's theory that either Goscelin or Folcard wrote the Vita, but they disagree about which of the two it was. Licence suggests that Folcard was the more likely candidate. Licence cites the author's use of rarer words such as nubigena and munificentia—as well as the frequent use of interdum—as lining up with Folcard's writing style. Most recently, Moreed Arbabzadah has also put forth a further case for Folcard by analyzing the number of verb-medial constructions (separation of two connected words by a verb) in the Vita, as well as the works of both Goscelin and Folcard. Arbabzadah shows that in this respect, Folcard is a significantly more likely candidate for authorship. Even so, Arbabzadah is cautious in assigning Folcard as the author, saying that statistics are not a perfect tool, and that the Vita "certainly deserves further attention in future work on questions of attribution".

Goscelin is continually held up as a possible candidate. In 1943, historian Richard Southern had postulated Goscelin as the likely author, and this was the identification favoured by Antonia Gransden. Rhona Beare argues that the biblical and classical allusions in the text have parallels in Goscelin's known works, particularly the reference to the four rivers of Eden, and the term, Cyllenius heros. Simon Keynes and Rosalind Love, however, responded that these claims were weak, considering that the reference to the four rivers of Paradise is handled differently in the Vita than in other works by Goscelin, and that the term, Cyllenius heros, was likely widely known at the time due to another popular text that contained it.

=== Patronage ===
Barlow comments that in the Vita: "The only unity is the author's desire to please the queen. It is likely that Edith had commissioned the work." Even beyond who penned the words of the text, the most crucial piece in understanding the Vita is to understand the situation and mind of its patron: Queen Edith. She was the daughter of Godwin and the wife to Edward, and it would not be an understatement to say that she was the most powerful woman in England at the time of her reign as queen, and possibly even afterward. She was a crucial piece in her father's plan of control for his family. It was quite unusual for so much power in England to be concentrated in the hands of a single other family other than the royal family, and the Godwins had mastered this. Edith was—in some ways—the greatest piece in this puzzle, being the wife of the king himself, and thus bringing her family into Edward's most intimate circle. The Vita is essentially her story—or rather, it is the story of the people who were closest to her, told from her perspective. Edith's perspective is of a Godwin, seeking to uphold the power and dignity of her family. She effectively had two roles/identities: the queen of England, and the daughter of Godwin; no matter what happened, her fate was intrinsically tied to that of her own family. For this reason, she tried in every way (through her anonymous writer) to redeem her family from whatever stains and faults it could be accused of. She attempted to shift blame away from her brothers and toward the corrupt English church whenever possible. The eventual falling out between Harold and Tostig is the ultimate loss and tragedy: the ruin of the great house of Godwin which Edith worked so hard to uphold and protect.

The Vita encapsulates Edith's greatest hopes and fears at the time it was written. The prose of the first part is ambitious, hopeful, and joyful for the sake of the Godwins and their triumphs. At the time of Harold's coronation, the Godwins reached the apex of their power, and they did not know that it was all about to end. The poetry is representative of Edith grieving for the loss of peace, prosperity, and power that the Godwins suffered because of the feud between Harold and Tostig, and ultimately, the arrival of the Normans. The prose of the second half shows Edith finding a new way forward, remembering the sanctity of her husband. This could also have been a safeguard to justify a work that spoke so well of the Godwins in an era when Norman rule would have been hostile to memories of the old power structure.

Edith did well under William's regime, likely in part due to her ability to adapt, knowing when to let go of the past—as the Vita exemplifies—and yet not ceasing to be English. Carola Hicks suggest that she was also the author of the Bayeux Tapestry, saying that she used it to support the Norman invasion, while not destroying the English legacy, attempting to become a unifying force of peace. She could be both English and something else at the same time. After all, by blood, she was half Danish. Why could she not honor the legacy of the old England, while supporting William's new one? She could be like her predecessor, Emma, who was Norman by birth, married an English king, then a Danish one, and then commissioned a book presenting herself as the hero of the story (the Encomium Emmae Reginae).

== Bibliography ==
- Arbabzadah, Moreed (2021). "Word Order in Goscelin and Folcard: Implications for the Attribution of the Vita Ædwardi regis and Other Works". The Journal of Medieval Latin. 31. ISSN 0778-9750.
- Barlow, Frank (2002). The Godwins:The Rise and Fall of a Noble Dynasty. London, UK: Pearson Longman. ISBN 978-0-582-78440-6.
- Barlow, Frank (2004). "Folcard (d. after 1085), monk, musician, and hagiographer". Oxford Dictionary of National Biography. Oxford Dictionary of National Biography (online ed.). Oxford University Press. doi:10.1093/ref:odnb/9783. (Subscription, Wikipedia Library access or UK public library membership required.)
- Barlow, Frank, ed. (1992), The Life of King Edward who Rests at Westminster Attributed to a Monk of Saint-Bertin (2nd ed.), Oxford: Clarendon Press, ISBN 0-19-820203-2
- Baxter, Stephen (2009). "Edward the Confessor and the Succession Question". In Mortimer, Richard (ed.). Edward the Confessor: The Man and the Legend. Woodbridge, UK: The Boydell Press. pp. 77–118. ISBN 978-1-84383-436-6.
- Beare, Rhona (September 2008). "Did Goscelin Write the Earliest Life of Edward the Confessor?". Notes and Queries. 55 (3): 262–265.
- Gransden, Antonia (1997). Historical Writing in England. Vol. 1, c. 550–c.1307. London: Routledge. ISBN 0-415-15124-4.
- Grassi, J. L. (2003), "The Vita Ædwardi Regis: The Hagiographer as Insider", in Gillingham, John (ed.), Anglo-Norman Studies: Proceedings of the Battle Conference, vol. XXVI, Woodbridge: Boydell & Brewer, pp. 87–102, ISBN 1-84383-072-8, ISSN 0954-9927, archived from the original on 2006-02-26
- Hicks, Carola (2006). The Bayeux tapestry : the life story of a masterpiece. London, UK: Chatto & Windus. ISBN 9780701174637.
- Keynes, Simon; Love, Rosalind (2010). "Earl Godwine's Ship". Anglo-Saxon England. 38: 185–229.
- Licence, Tom (2016). "The Date and Authorship of the Vita Ædwardi Regis". Anglo-Saxon England. 44: 259–285. ISSN 0263-6751.
- Luard, Henry Richards, ed. (1858). Lives of Edward the Confessor: I. La Estoire de Seint Aedward le Rei. II. Vita Beati Edvardi Regis et Confessoris. III. Vita Æduuardi Regis qui Apud Westmonasterium Requiescit. Rerum Britannicarum Medii Aevi scriptores; 3. London: Longman, Brown, Green, Longmans, and Roberts.
- Morris, Marc (2012). The Norman Conquest: The Battle of Hastings and the Fall of Anglo-Saxon England. New York: Pegasus Books.
- Otter, Monika (July 1999). "1066: The Moment of Transition in Two Narratives of the Norman Conquest". Speculum. 74 (3): 565–586.
- Southern, R. W. (1943). "The First Life of Edward the Confessor" (PDF). The English Historical Review. 58: 385–40. doi:10.1093/ehr/lviii.ccxxxii.385. ISSN 0013-8266.
- Stafford, Pauline (2001). Queen Emma and Queen Edith (paperback ed.). Oxford, UK: Blackwell. ISBN 978-0-631-16679-5.
