= Edith of Wessex =

Queen of England from 1045 to 1066

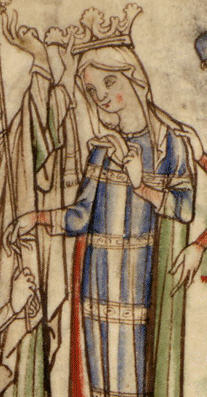
- Coronation of Queen Edith, illustrated by Matthew Paris in the 13th century

Queen consort of the English
- Tenure: 23 January 1045 – 5 January 1066
- Coronation: 23 January 1045, Old Minster, Winchester
- Born: Gytha c. 1025
- Died: 18 December 1075; Winchester, Hampshire, England
- Burial: Westminster Abbey, England
- Spouse: Edward the Confessor (m. 1045; died 1066)
- House: Godwin
- Father: Godwin, Earl of Wessex
- Mother: Gytha Thorkelsdóttir

Edith of Wessex (Old English: Ealdgyth; c. 1025 – 18 December 1075) was Queen of England through her marriage to Edward the Confessor from 1045 until Edward's death in 1066. Unlike most English queens in the 10th and 11th centuries, she was crowned. The principal source on her life is a work she herself commissioned, the Vita Ædwardi Regis or the Life of King Edward who rests at Westminster, which is inevitably biased.

== Early life ==
Edith was the daughter of Godwin, the most powerful earl in England. Her mother Gytha was sister of Ulf, a Danish earl who was Cnut the Great's brother-in-law. She was probably born in or before 1027. Edith was originally named Gytha, but renamed Ealdgyth (or Edith) when she married King Edward the Confessor. Her brothers were Sweyn, Harold (later King Harold II), Tostig, Gyrth, Leofwine, and Wulfnoth. Edith was the firstborn of Godwin's three daughters, which included her sisters Gunhild (or Gunhilda) and Ælfgifu. The exact birthdates of the Godwin children are unknown, but Sweyn was the firstborn and Harold was the second son. Harold was aged about 25 in 1045, which makes his birth date around 1020.

Edith was brought up at Wilton Abbey. She was an educated woman who spoke several languages including English, Danish, French, Irish, and Latin, skills she probably acquired at Wilton. She remained attached to it, and in later years rebuilt its church. Her niece Gunhild of Wessex would also be educated at Wilton.

The Vita Edwardi emphasised her piety. She helped Giso, the Bishop of Wells, secure the endowments of his see, and gave lands to Abingdon Abbey, but the monks of Evesham alleged that she had the relics of many monasteries brought to Gloucester so that she could select the best for herself. When Gervin, abbot of Saint-Riquier, was visiting the English court, he rejected her kiss of greeting and she took offence. Edward reproved her, and she accepted the rebuff, even going on to urge English churchmen not to kiss women, although they did not object to the custom.

Edith lost four of her brothers in a very short span. Tostig died on 25 September 1066 during the Battle of Stamford Bridge. Three others – Harold, Gyrth, and Leofwine – all died less than three weeks later on 14 October 1066, during the Battle of Hastings.

== Marriage and life as queen ==
Edith married Edward on 23 January 1045. Unlike most wives of the Saxon kings of England in the tenth and eleventh centuries, Edith was crowned queen. The marriage produced no children. Later ecclesiastical writers claimed that this was either because Edward took a vow of celibacy, or because he refused to consummate the marriage because of his antipathy to Edith's family, the Godwins. However, this is dismissed by modern historians. In the view of Edward's biographer, Frank Barlow, "the theory that Edward's childlessness was due to deliberate abstention from sexual relations lacks authority, plausibility and diagnostic value."

In 1051, Godwin and his sons fell out with Edward and fled the country. Edith was sent to a nunnery, possibly because she was childless and Edward hoped to divorce her. When the Godwins effected their return through force in 1052, Edith was reinstated as queen. In later years, she became one of Edward's inner group of advisers. In the Vita Edwardi, according to Barlow, "although she is always placed modestly behind the throne, the author does not minimize her power or completely conceal her will. Whenever we catch sight of her elsewhere, we see a determined woman, interfering, hard, probably bad-tempered."

As the king's wife, she was responsible for his regal presentation. She commissioned works for his personal ornament, and had at least one goldsmith among her tenants. When he died, she was the richest woman in England, and the fourth wealthiest individual after the king, Stigand (the Archbishop of Canterbury), and her brother Harold. She held land valued at between £1,570 and £2,000 per annum.

She was close to her brother Tostig, and in 1055 she and Harold secured his appointment as Earl of Northumbria. His rule was unpopular, and in 1064 Edith was accused at court of engineering the murder of the Northumbrian noble Gospatrick in Tostig's interest. In 1065, Tostig was probably hunting with King Edward when the northerners rebelled and elected Morcar, Harold's brother-in-law, as earl. Tostig charged Harold with conspiring with the rebels, a charge which Harold purged himself of with a public oath. Edward demanded that the rebels be suppressed, but to his and Edith's fury, Harold and the English thegns refused to enforce the order. Morcar was confirmed as earl and Tostig forced into exile.

== Later life and death ==
Upon Edward's death (5 January 1066), he was succeeded by Edith's brother, Harold Godwinson. At the Battle of Stamford Bridge (25 September 1066) and the Battle of Hastings (14 October 1066), Edith lost four of her remaining brothers (Tostig, Harold, Gyrth and Leofwine). Her brother Wulfnoth, who had been given to Edward the Confessor as a hostage in 1051 and soon afterwards became a prisoner of William the Conqueror, remained in captivity in Normandy. Edith was therefore the only senior member of the Godwin family to survive the Norman conquest on English soil, the sons of Harold having fled to Ireland.

After Edward's death, Edith read the lives of English saints and gave information about St Kenelm to his hagiographer, Goscelin. She died at Winchester on 18 December 1075. Matthew Paris records a tradition that her death brought an end to an illness from which she had been suffering at some length. She was buried together with her husband in Westminster Abbey and her funeral was arranged by William. The northern author of the Anglo-Saxon Chronicle, Manuscript D, reports:

Edith the Lady died seven nights before Christmas in Winchester, she was King Edward's wife, and the king had her brought to Westminster with great honour and laid her near King Edward, her lord.

In 2006, Carola Hicks, an art historian, put her forward as a candidate for the author of the Bayeux Tapestry.

== See also ==
- House of Wessex family tree
- Cnut the Great's family tree

== Bibliography ==
- Barlow, Frank (1997) Edward the Confessor, Yale University Press: London
- Mason, Emma (2004). The House of Godwine: The History of a Dynasty. London, UK: Hambledon and London. ISBN 978-1-85285-389-1.
- Stafford, Pauline (1997). Queen Emma and Queen Edith: Queenship and Women's Power in Eleventh-Century England, Blackwell ISBN 0-631-16679-3
- Stafford, Pauline (2009). 'Edith, Edward's Wife and Queen', pp. 129–138 in Richard Mortimer ed., Edward the Confessor: The Man and the Legend, The Boydell Press ISBN 978-1-84383-436-6
- Tyler, Elizabeth M. (2017). England in Europe: English Royal Women and Literary Patronage, c.1000–c.1150. University of Toronto Press
- Williams, Ann (2004). "Edith (d. 1075)". Oxford Dictionary of National Biography (online ed.). Oxford University Press. doi:10.1093/ref:odnb/8483. (Subscription, Wikipedia Library access or UK public library membership required.)

English royalty
Vacant Title last held by Emma of Normandy	Queen consort of the English; 23 January 1045 – 4 January 1066	Succeeded by Edith of Mercia
