= Thorgils Sprakelegg =

11th-century Danish nobleman

Thorgils Sprakalegg (also called Thorgil, Torkel, Torgils, Thrugils, Sprakling or Sprakalägg) was a Danish nobleman whose children were active in the politics of Denmark and England in the early 11th century and who was grandfather of kings of both nations.

== Mentions ==
Genealogical speculations of a later date (presumably first suggested by the Danish historians Jakob Langebek and Peter Frederik Suhm) would make Thorgil son of the Viking Styrbjörn the Strong, who in turn is depicted as son of Olaf Björnsson, king of Sweden. Styrbjorn's wife in the sagas, Thyra, was the daughter of Harold Bluetooth, king of Denmark and Norway. No primary source supports this theory and the theory itself is almost impossible to maintain because of the chronological inconsistencies.

Little is recorded about Thorgils in historical texts outside of his place in the genealogy of his children or grandchildren. Thorgils' cognomen Sprakalägg can be translated into English as "Break-leg" or "Strut-leg".

The 12th-century English chronicler John of Worcester reports in an entry dated 1049 that Earl Beorn Estrithson was brother of King Svein of Denmark, and son of Danish Earl Ulf, son of Spracling[us], son of Urs[us]. Here Spraclingus is a garbled representation of the byname of Thorgils appearing in later Scandinavian sources, while Ursus is the Latin urso, or bear (Bjørn in Danish, Björn in Swedish).

He appears in several 13th-century sources. He is Torgils or Þorgils Sprakaleggs in Knýtlinga saga and in two works of Snorri Sturluson – Óláfs saga helga in Heimskringla, and the Separate Saga of St. Olaf – each time simply as father of Earl Ulf. Two other 13th-century sources relate folklore that derives Thorgils from the mating of a bear with a noblewoman. Danish historian Saxo Grammaticus recorded that the son born to such a union was 'named after his father' (i.e. called 'bear' – Ursus/Björn; in the 14th-century summary of Saxo's work, Compendium Saxonis, he is explicitly named 'Byorn') and was himself father of 'Thrugillus, called Sprageleg', father of Earl Ulf. Saxo further says of 'Thrugillis' that he "lacked not one ounce of his father's valour" (nullo probitatis vestigio a paternae virtutis imitatione defecit). The other source, Gesta Antecessorum Comitis Waldevi, copies the early generations of John of Worcester's pedigree but, confusing two like-named men, replaces Earl Beorn Estrithson as Earl Ulf's son with Björn Boreson, the father of Siward, Earl of Northumbria. This pedigree commences with an episode not found in the Worcester chronicler's pedigree but similar to that of Saxo, that a 'certain nobleman', contrary to the natural order of human procreation, had a white bear as his father and a noblewoman as a mother, before continuing the pedigree with 'Ursus begat Spratlingus'. The chronicle sometimes attributed to the 15th-century John Brompton tells a very similar tale of bear-paternity relating to the birth of Björn Boresune ('bear's son') himself. Historian Timothy Bolton has suggested that the role of a bear in the immediate ancestry of both Ulf's children and Siward's line may represent a tradition shared by relatives rather than that two independent families at about the same time both co-opting the same ancient Norwegian legend for their immediate ancestry – that Björn Boresune and Thorgils may have been brothers.

In the 18th century, Danish historian Jakob Langebek suggested this bear story was allegorical, and that the brutish 'Wild' Björn, father of Thorgils, was a reference to Jomsviking brigand leader Styrbjörn the Strong (Styrbjörn Starke), depicted by sagas as the son of Olaf Björnsson, king of Sweden. The sagas relate that Styrbjörn was the first husband of Tyra, the daughter of Harold Bluetooth, king of Denmark and Norway. Otto Brenner's detailed study of the descendants of Gorm the Old gives his granddaughter Tyra and Styrbjörn no children.

== Children ==
- Ulf (died 1027) – Earl in Denmark and brother-in law of King Cnut the Great. His son became King Sweyn II of Denmark.
- Eileifr (Eglaf), named in a Supplement to Jómsvíkinga saga as "Eilífr Þorgilsson, bróðir Úlfs", he was one of the leaders of Thorkell the Tall's 1009 invasion of England, and appears between 1019 and 1024 as an earl under King Cnut with jurisdiction centered on Gloucester. He ravaged the South Wales coastal region in 1022/3, but apparently left England for Scandinavia in 1024.
- Gytha Thorkelsdóttir – married Godwin, Earl of Wessex; mother of King Harold Godwinson of England and Edith of Wessex, Queen of King Edward the Confessor.

Sweyn Forkbeard; King of Denmark	Thorgils Sprakelegg
Estrid Svendsdatter	Ulf Jarl	Gytha Thorkelsdóttir	Godwin, Earl of Wessex
Sweyn II; King of Denmark	Harold Godwinson; King of England	Edith of Wessex	Edward the Confessor; King of England
