= Gytha Thorkelsdóttir =

Danish noblewoman (c. 997 – c. 1069)

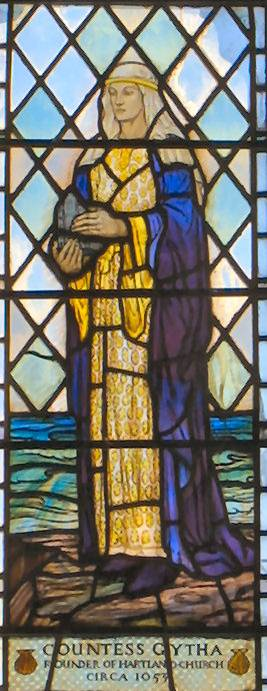
- Gytha depicted in modern stained glass
- Born: c. 997
- Died: In or after 1067
- Spouse: Godwin, Earl of Wessex
- Issue more...: Sweyn, Earl of Herefordshire; Harold II, King of England; Edith, Queen of England; Tostig, Earl of Northumbria; Gyrth, Earl of East Anglia; Leofwine, Earl of Kent; Wulfnoth
- Father: Thorgil Sprakling

Gytha Thorkelsdóttir (c. 997 – c. 1069), also called Githa, was a Danish noblewoman. She was the wife of Godwin, Earl of Wessex, and the mother of King Harold Godwinson and Edith of Wessex, the latter of whom was the queen consort of King Edward the Confessor.

== Biography ==
Gytha Thorkelsdóttir was the daughter of Danish chieftain Thorgil Sprakling (also called Thorkel). Gytha was also the sister of the Danish Earl Ulf Thorgilsson who was married to Estrid Svendsdatter, the sister of King Cnut the Great. She married the Anglo-Saxon nobleman Godwin of Wessex. They had a large family, and one of their sons, Harold, became king of England.

Two of their sons, Harold and Tostig, faced each other at the Battle of Stamford Bridge, where Tostig was killed. Less than a month later, three of her sons – Harold, Gyrth, and Leofwine – were killed by William the Conqueror's invading Norman army at the Battle of Hastings. She pleaded with William for the return of the body of her slain son, King Harold, but was unsuccessful. Shortly after the Battle of Hastings, Gytha was living in Exeter and may have been the cause of that city's rebellion against William the Conqueror in 1067, which resulted in his laying siege to the city. According to the Anglo-Saxon Chronicle, Gytha left England after the Norman conquest, together with the wives or widows and families of other prominent Anglo-Saxons, all the Godwin family estates having been confiscated by William. Little else is known of Gytha's life after that time, although it is probable that she went to Scandinavia where she had relatives. However, The Chronicle of John of Worcester indicated she retired to Flanders in 1067.

Her youngest and only surviving son, Wulfnoth, lived nearly all his life in captivity in Normandy until the death of William the Conqueror in 1087. Only her eldest daughter, Queen Edith (d. 1075), still held some power (however nominal) as the widow of King Edward the Confessor.

== Children ==
- Sweyn Godwinson, Earl of Herefordshire (c. 1020–1052), who at some point declared himself an illegitimate son of Canute the Great although this is considered to be a false claim
- Harold Godwinson, King of England (c. 1022 – 14 October 1066)
- Edith of Wessex (c. 1025 – 19 December 1075), queen consort of Edward the Confessor
- Tostig Godwinson, Earl of Northumbria (c. 1026 – 25 September 1066)
- Gyrth Godwinson Earl of East Anglia (c. 1030 – 14 October 1066)
- Gunhilda of Wessex, a nun (c. 1035–1087)
- Leofwine Godwinson, Earl of Kent (c. 1035 – 14 October 1066)
- Ælfgifu of Wessex (c. 1035)
- Wulfnoth Godwinson (c. 1040–1094)

== See also ==
- House of Wessex family tree
- Cnut the Great's family tree
