= Gyrid of Sweden =

10th-century Queen of Denmark

Gyrid
- Queen consort of Denmark
- Reign: 980s
- Spouse: Harald Bluetooth
- House: House of Munsö (by birth); House of Denmark (by marriage)

Gyrid (Latin: Gyritha) was the (likely legendary) wife of Harald Bluetooth according to Book 10 of the Gesta Danorum, an influential chronicle of Danish kings by Saxo Grammaticus. According to this version, she was the sister of Styrbjörn the Strong, who in this version was the son of King Biorn of Sweden (although other surviving sources have Styrbjörn as the son of Biorn's son Olaf). Gyrid and Harald married after Styrbjörn was forced out of Sweden by Eric (here the son of Olaf) and sought Harald's help to retake the country. Gyrid was recorded as having two sons by Harald: Hakon (Haquinus) and Swein Forkbeard.

In 1603, the Danish historian Arild Huitfeldt recorded Gyrid/Gyritha as the wife of Harald Bluetooth. However, her historicity is unclear. Other sources either do not mention her (Knýtlinga saga, for example, says that Styrbjörn invaded Denmark and Harald gave his daughter Tyra to be Styrbjörn's wife; no mention is made of a reciprocal marriage between Harald and a member of Styrbjörn's family) or give the wife of Harald a different name (Adam of Bremen refers to Harald's wife and Swein Forkbeard's mother as Gunnhild; the Sønder Vissing Runestone records the wife of Harald as Tofa).

Gyrid of Sweden Born: 10th century
Preceded by Tove of the Obotrites	Royal consort of Denmark; 980s	Succeeded by Gunhild of Wenden ?
