= Wulfnoth Cild =

South Saxon thegn, probable father of Godwin, Earl of Wessex

- Thegn
- Died: c. 1014
- Noble family: Godwin
- Issue: Godwin, Earl of Wessex; Elfig, Abbot of Newminster
- Father: Æthelmær

Wulfnoth Cild ([wuɫf.noːθ t͡ʃiɫd]; died c. June 1014) was a South Saxon thegn who is regarded by historians as the probable father of Godwin, Earl of Wessex, and thus the grandfather of King Harold II.

== Biography ==
It is known that Godwin's father was called Wulfnoth, and in the view of Frank Barlow, the Godwin family's massive estates in Sussex are indisputable evidence that the Wulfnoth in question was the South Saxon thegn.

In 1008, King Æthelred the Unready ordered the construction of a fleet, and the following year 300 ships assembled at Sandwich, Kent to meet a threatened Viking invasion. There Brihtric, brother of Eadric Streona, brought unknown charges against Wulfnoth before the king, unjustly according to John of Worcester. Wulfnoth then fled with twenty ships and ravaged the south coast. Brihtric followed with eighty, but his fleet was driven ashore by a storm and burnt by Wulfnoth. After the loss of a third of the fleet the remaining ships were withdrawn to London, and the Vikings were able to invade Kent unopposed. Æthelred almost certainly confiscated Wulfnoth's property as a result.

Wulfnoth Cild had died by June 1014.

== Legacy ==
The church of St. Mary Woolnoth in London was founded by an Anglo-Saxon nobleman named Wulfnoth, who may be the same as Wulfnoth Cild of Sussex.

== Ancestry ==
There has been some debate over the ancestry of Wulfnoth Cild. According to the twelfth-century chronicler John of Worcester, Wulfnoth was the son of a man called Æthelmær, who was the brother of Eadric Streona and son of a man called Æthelric. In the view of historian Ann Williams, this is chronologically impossible as it would lead to significant generational displacement.

A separate theory, first proposed by Alfred Anscombe in 1913, and advocated since by the genealogist Lundie W. Barlow in 1957 and the Mayanist scholar and genealogist David H. Kelley in 1989 suggests that this Æthelmær was the same person as Æthelmær the Stout, who himself was the son of Æthelweard, a historian, and he a descendant of Æthelred I of Wessex.

== See also ==
- House of Wessex family tree
- Cnut the Great's family tree
- Ancestry of the Godwins
