= Æthelmær the Stout =

Anglo-Saxon thegn

Æthelmær the Stout or Æthelmær the Fat (died 1015) a leading thegn from the 980s, discðegn (dish-bearer or seneschal) to King Æthelred the Unready, and briefly ealdorman of the Western Provinces in 1013. He was the founder of Cerne Abbey and Eynsham Abbey, and a patron of the leading scholar, Ælfric of Eynsham. He was the son of Æthelweard the historian, and descended from King Æthelred I.

== Career ==
Together with his father, he was a patron of the homilist Ælfric of Eynsham. In 987 Æthelmær founded or re-founded Cerne Abbey in Dorset, and in 1005 founded Eynsham Abbey in Oxfordshire, where he made Ælfric its first abbot, along with Priory of Bruton in Somerset. Ælfric dedicated his Lives of the Saints to Æthelmær.

In a charter of 993 in which King Æthelred II laments his past misrule, which had resulted “partly on account of the ignorance of my youth, and partly on account of the abhorrent greed of certain of those men who ought to administer to my interest”, Æthelmaer is acknowledged, along with King’s uncle, Ordulf of Tavistock, as a loyal counsellor, and from the mid 990s he generally appears first among the ministers witnessing charters, followed by Ordulf, Wulfheah and Wulfgeat.

Upon the death of his father Æthelweard in 998, no ealdorman was appointed to the Western Provinces, though both Æthelmær and Ordulf, whose father Ordgar had preceded Æthelweard, would have been obvious candidates.

From 1006, the notorious Eadric Streona leapfrogs Æthelmaer, Ordulf, Wulfgeat and Wulfheah, to the head of the list of ministers. Wulfheah is known to have been blinded after Eadric murdered his father, ealdorman Ælfhelm of York, while Wulfgeat was deprived of all his lands. Ordulf is another who ceases to witness after 1006, and it is probable that the Æthelmaer who continues to attest charters after this date is another prominent thegn, Æthelmaer, son of Æthelwold. Another Æthelmaer who occasionally attests charters at this time in a lower position is possibly one of the brothers of Eadric Streona.

By 1013, Æthelmaer had evidently regained any lost favour as he had assumed his father's old ealdormanry of the Western Provinces. In this year, he and his followers surrendered to the Danish invader Swein Forkbeard, who was encamped at Bath. He died in 1015.

== Descendants ==
One of his sons, Æthelnoth, became Archbishop of Canterbury. Another, Æthelweard, was killed by Cnut in 1017, while a son-in-law also called Æthelweard was exiled in 1020.

Æthelmær has been speculatively identified with the Agelmær named by John of Worcester as brother of Eadric Streona and father of Wulfnoth Cild, who was father of Godwin, Earl of Wessex and grandfather of King Harold II, although the Worcester chronicler makes this Agelmær son of Agelric rather than Æthelweard, and the pedigree as a whole has problematic chronology. This theory of the ancestry of the Godwins has been criticized by other genealogists and is rejected by most historians.
