= Hakon Sweynson =

11th-century English noble

Hakon Sweynson (Old English: Hacon Swegenson; fl. 1051 – In or after 1064) was the only son of Sweyn Godwinson, brother of Harold II of England.

== Biography ==
He was given as a hostage to Edward the Confessor in 1051 as assurance of his grandfather Godwin, Earl of Wessex's bad behaviour and support during the confrontation between the earl and the king which led to the exile of Godwin and his other sons.

Upon Godwin's return to England at the head of an army in 1052, following extensive preparations in Ireland and Flanders, Norman supporters of King Edward, and especially Archbishop Robert of Jumièges, fled England. It is likely at this point that Hakon (and Wulfnoth, a younger son of Godwin) were spirited away by the fleeing archbishop, and taken to Normandy, where they were handed over to Duke William of Normandy.

According to Eadmer's Historia novorum in Anglia, the reason for Harold's excursion to Normandy in 1064 or 1065 was that he wished to free Wulfnoth and Hakon. To this end he took with him a vast amount of wealth, all of which was paid to Count Guy I of Ponthieu.

Hakon returned to England with Harold, and nothing more is known of him after this point. However, his uncle Wulfnoth remained in Normandy, took no part in the battle of Hastings, and outlived William the Conqueror. It is possible Hakon fought and died alongside his family at the Battle of Hastings. Which would explain his hasty disappearance from history.
