= Ulf Jarl =

Danish jarl and regent of Denmark

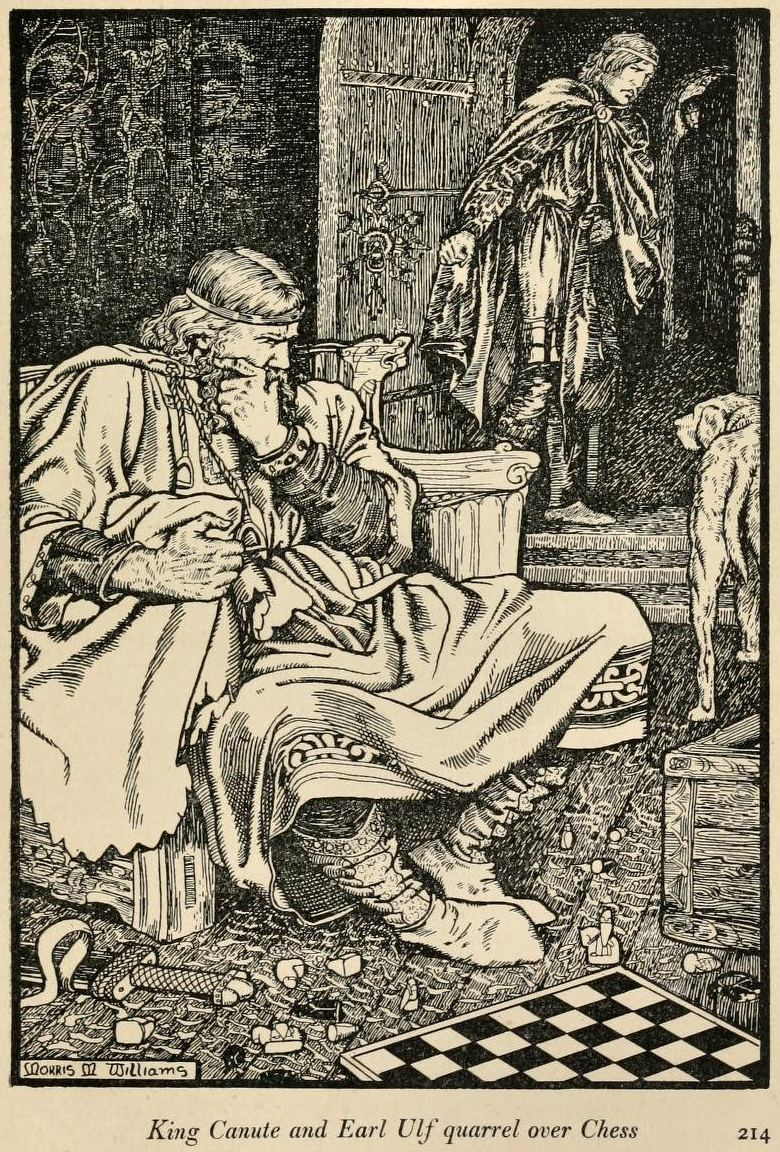
King Canute and Earl Ulf as imagined by Morris Meredith Williams in 1913

Ulf Thorgilsson, commonly known as Ulf Jarl or Earl Ulf, was a Danish jarl of Skåne and regent of Denmark. Ulf was the son of Thorgil Sprakling and the father of King Sweyn II of Denmark, and thus the progenitor of the House of Estridsen, which would rule Denmark from 1047 to 1375. Some sources, especially those of Swedish origin, referred to the House of Estridsen as the Ulfinger dynasty to honour him.

== Biography ==
Ulf Jarl was the son of Danish chieftain Thorgils Sprakalägg. In the 18th century, Danish historian Jacob Langebek proposed that Styrbjörn Starke and Tyra Haraldsdotter were the parents of Thorkel Sprakalegg. Therefore, this would make Ulf Jarl a descendant of Olof (II) Björnsson of the House of Munsö and through Tyra a descendant of Harald Bluetooth of the House of Knýtlinga. His brother Eilaf was an earl of King Cnut the Great and his sister Gytha Thorkelsdóttir married Godwin, Earl of Wessex. In 1016, he participated in Cnut the Great's invasion of England. He participated in the conquest of England as one of Cnut's most trusted men. From c. 1024 he was appointed the Jarl of Denmark and King Cnut's appointee as regent of Denmark. In the absence of King Cnut, he ruled as the foster-father and guardian of Cnut's son Harthacnut.

In 1015–16, he married Cnut's sister, Estrid Svendsdatter of Denmark, by whom he had sons, Svein, who later became the king of Denmark, and Beorn (Bjørn), who would become an Earl in England. Chronicler Adam of Bremen also gives Ulf a son, Åsbjørn, but does not explicitly name him as son of Estrith, as he does with Svein and Beorn. There may have also been a daughter - Harald Hardrådes saga, part of Heimskringla by Snorri Sturluson gives an account of Åsmund, son of Svein's sister, yet he is likely the same Åsmund named as son of Beorn in Morkinskinna.

In 1026, Swedish King Anund Jakob and Norwegian King Olaf II took advantage of King Cnut's absence and launched an attack on the Danish in the Baltic Sea. Ulf convinced the freemen to elect Harthacnut king, since they were discontented at Cnut's absenteeism. This was a ruse on Ulf's part since his role as Harthacnut's guardian would make him the ruler of Denmark. When Cnut learnt what had happened, he returned to Denmark and fought naval engagement against the Swedish and Norwegian forces at the Battle of the Helgeå. The victory left Cnut as the dominant leader in Scandinavia.

The Anglo-Saxon Chronicle, which instead places the battle a year earlier in 1025, names the leaders of the Swedes as Ulf and Eglaf, usually identified with Ulf Jarl and his brother Eilaf. Saxo likewise would have Ulf fighting Cnut at Helgeå. However the Saga of Olaf the Holy in the Heimskringla gives an account in which Cnut, although having lost the land battle, was the overall victor when Ulf helped him win the accompanying sea battle. One possible explanation for this conflict of sources is that Ulf fought with the Swedes against Cnut in a 1025 battle not recounted by the saga because Olaf did not take part, but Ulf switched sides before the battle at Helgeå.

If Eilaf fought against Cnut, he was forgiven as he was retained as Earl in England until Cnut's death, and then fled, suggesting he was closely linked to the king.

Any rapprochement with Ulf was short-lived. At a banquet in Roskilde, the two brothers-in-law were playing chess and started arguing with each other after Cnut refused to accept the loss of his knight. The next day, the Christmas of 1026, Cnut had one of his housecarls kill Earl Ulf in Trinity Church, the predecessor of Roskilde Cathedral.

== Other sources ==
- Lawson, M. K. (1995) Cnut: The Danes in England in the Early Eleventh Century (Addison-Wesley Longman Ltd) ISBN 978-0582059702

== Related reading ==
- Lawson, M. K. (2004) Cnut – England's Viking King (Tempus) ISBN 978-0752429649
- Hollander, Lee M., translator (1991) Heimskringla: History of the Kings of Norway (University of Texas Press) ISBN 978-0292730618
- Trow, M. J. (2005) Cnut – Emperor of the North (Sutton Publishing Ltd) ISBN 978-0750933872
