= Tostig Godwinson =

11th-century Anglo-Saxon earl

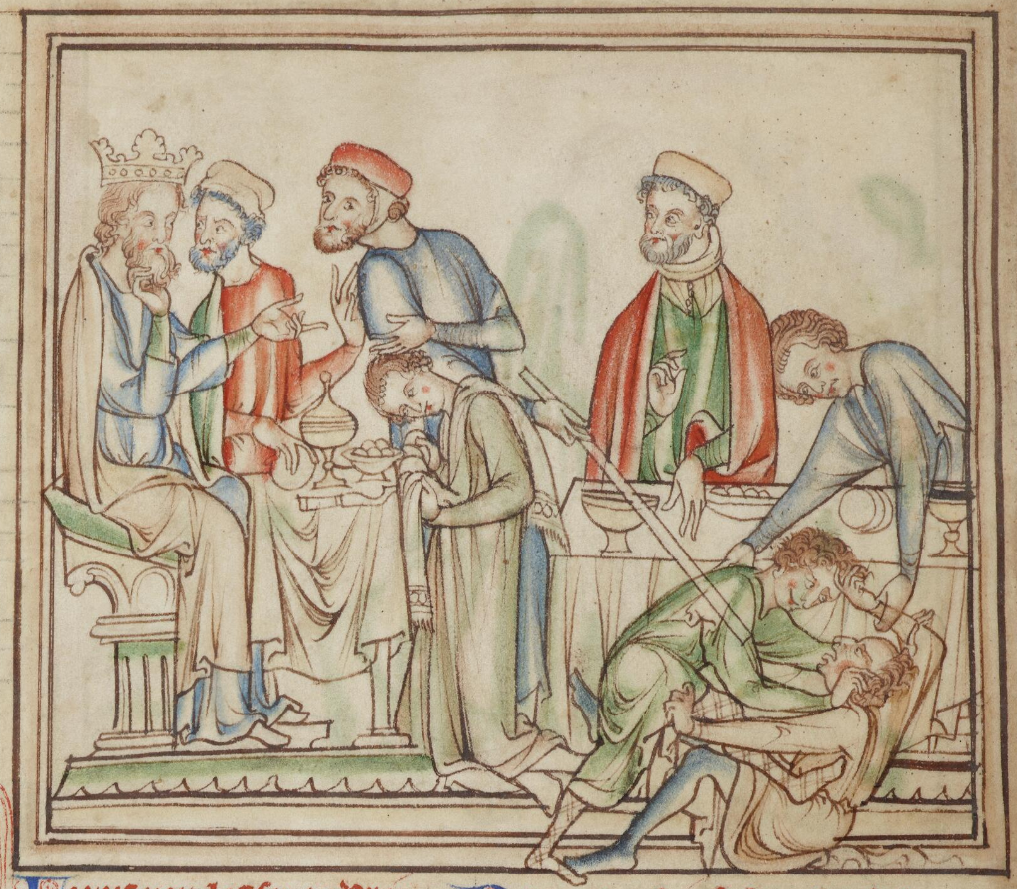
- Tostig and his brother Harold, with Edward the Confessor. Miniature from Matthew Paris's Vie de seint Aedward le Rei, c. 1250–1260 (Cambridge, University Library, MS Ee.3.59)

Earl of Northumbria
- Reign: 1055–1065
- Predecessor: Siward
- Successor: Morcar
- Born: c. 1029
- Died: 25 September 1066 (aged about 37); Stamford Bridge, England
- Burial: York Minster
- Spouse: Judith of Flanders
- Issue: Skuli Tostisson Kongsfostre; Ketil Tostisson
- House: Godwin
- Father: Godwin, Earl of Wessex
- Mother: Gytha

Tostig Godwinson (c. 1029 – 25 September 1066) was an Anglo-Saxon Earl of Northumbria and brother of King Harold Godwinson. After being exiled by his brother, Tostig supported the Norwegian king Harald Hardrada's invasion of England, and was killed alongside Hardrada at the Battle of Stamford Bridge in 1066.

== Background ==
Tostig was the third son of the Anglo-Saxon nobleman Godwin, Earl of Wessex and Gytha Thorkelsdóttir, the daughter of Danish chieftain Thorgil Sprakling. In 1051, he married Judith of Flanders, the only child of Baldwin IV, Count of Flanders by his second wife, Eleanor of Normandy. In 1086, the Domesday Book recorded twenty-six vills or townships as being held by Earl Tostig, forming the Manor of Hougun which now forms part of the county of Cumbria in north-west England.

== Earl of Northumbria ==
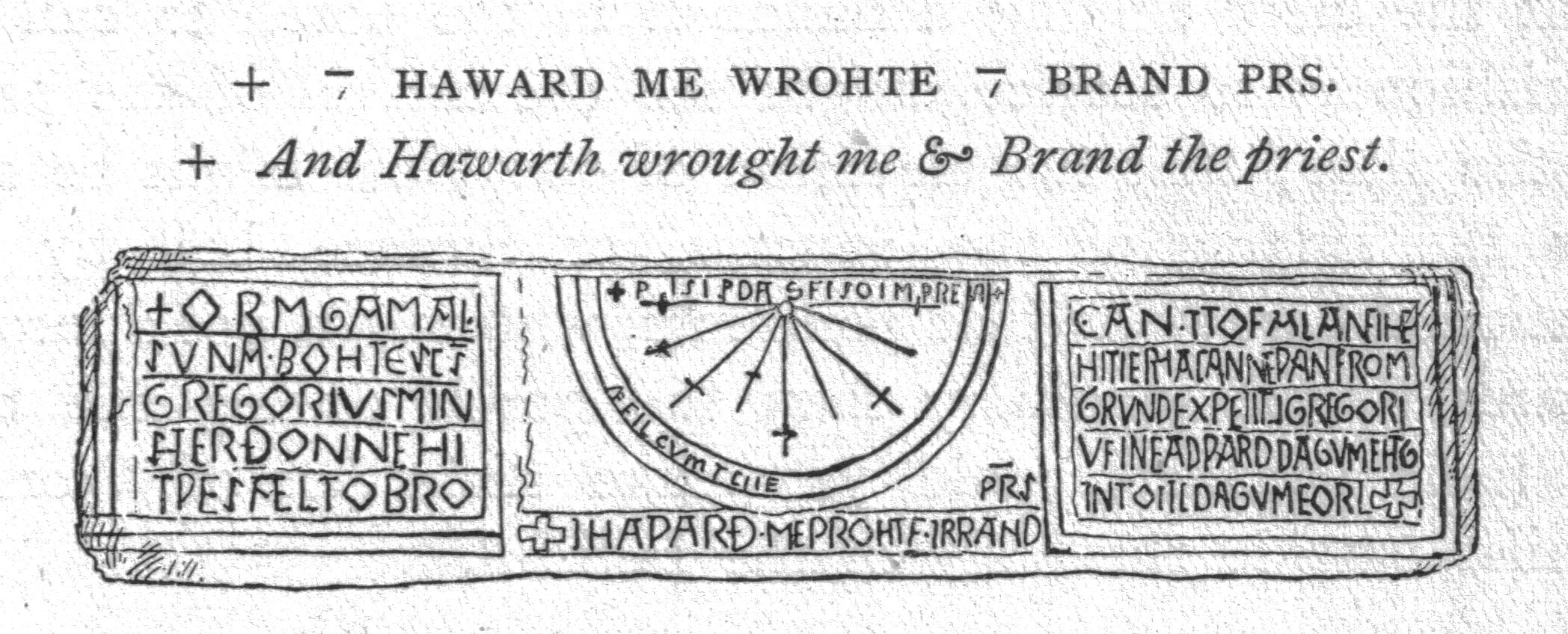
Drawing of the Kirkdale sundial in Kirkdale, North Yorkshire, with Earl Tostig's name in the dedication IN TOSTI DAGVM EORL+ ('in Earl Tostig's day', at bottom right)

In the 19th century, the antiquarian Edward Augustus Freeman posited a hypothesis claiming that Edward the Confessor, King of England, was pursuing a policy of "Normanisation" of England and, by doing so, was reducing the influence of the House of Godwin. In 1051, Earl Godwin's opposition to Edward's policies had brought England to the brink of civil war. Eventually, the Godwins' opposition convinced Edward to banish them in 1051. Freeman's explanation of the banishment has many critics, (Note: For more discussion on this see DeVries. The Norwegian Invasion of England in 1066. pp. 91–104) as it does not explain fully the relationship between the Godwins and the king.

The banished Godwin family, including Gytha and Tostig, together with Sweyn and Gyrth, sought refuge with Tostig's brother-in-law the Count of Flanders. They returned to England the following year with armed forces, gaining support and demanding that Edward restore Harold's earldom. Three years later in 1055, Tostig became the Earl of Northumbria upon the death of Earl Siward. He was on intimate terms with his brother-in-law, Edward the Confessor, and in 1061 he visited Pope Nicholas II at Rome in the company of Ealdred, archbishop of York.

Tostig appears to have governed in Northumbria with some difficulty. He was never popular with the Northumbrian ruling class, a mix of Danish invaders and Anglo-Saxon survivors of the last Norse invasion. Tostig was said to have been heavy-handed with those who resisted his rule, including murdering several members of leading Northumbrian families. In late 1063 or early 1064, Tostig had Gamal son of Orm and Ulf son of Dolfin assassinated when Gamal visited him under safe conduct. The Vita Edwardi, otherwise sympathetic to Tostig, states that he had 'repressed [the Northumbrians] with the heavy yoke of his rule'.

He was frequently absent from the court of King Edward in the south, and, possibly, showed a lack of leadership against the raiding Scots. Their king was a personal friend of Tostig, and Tostig's unpopularity made it difficult to raise local levies to combat them. He resorted to using a strong force of Danish mercenaries (housecarls) as his main force, an expensive and resented policy (the housecarls' leaders were later slaughtered by rebels).

In addition, it is likely that local biases played a part in his unpopularity. Tostig was from the south of England, a distinctly different culture from the north, which had not had a southern earl in generations. In 1063, still immersed in the confused local politics of Northumbria, his popularity apparently plummeted. Many of the inhabitants of Northumbria were Danes, who had enjoyed lesser taxation than in other parts of England. Yet, the wars in Wales, of which Tostig's constituents were principal beneficiaries, needed to be paid for. Tostig had been a major commander in these wars attacking in the north while his brother Harold Godwinson marched up from the south.

== Deposition by his brother Harold and the thegns of Northumbria ==
On 3 October 1065, the thegns of York and the rest of Yorkshire descended on York and occupied the city. They killed Tostig's officials and supporters, then declared Tostig outlawed for his unlawful actions and sent for Morcar, younger brother of Edwin, Earl of Mercia. The northern rebels marched south to press their case with King Edward. They were joined at Northampton by Earl Edwin and his forces. There, they were met by Earl Harold, who had been sent by King Edward to negotiate with them and thus did not bring his forces. After Harold, by then the king's right-hand man, had spoken with the rebels at Northampton, he likely realized that Tostig would not be able to retain Northumbria. When he returned to Oxford, where the royal council was to meet on 28 October, he had probably already made up his mind.

== Exile and rebellion ==
Harold Godwinson persuaded King Edward the Confessor to agree to the demands of the rebels. Tostig was outlawed a short time later, possibly early in November, because he refused to accept his deposition as commanded by Edward. This led to the fateful confrontation and enmity between the two Godwinsons. At a meeting of the king and his council, Tostig publicly accused Harold of fomenting the rebellion. Harold was keen to unify England in the face of the grave threat from William of Normandy, who had openly declared his intention to take the English throne. It was likely that Harold had exiled his brother to ensure peace and loyalty in the north. Tostig, however, plotted vengeance.

Tostig, along with his family and some loyal thegns, took refuge with his brother-in-law, Baldwin V, Count of Flanders. He travelled to Normandy and attempted to form an alliance with William, who was his wife’s first cousin. Baldwin provided him with a fleet and he landed in the Isle of Wight in May 1066, where he collected money and provisions. He raided the coast as far as Sandwich but was forced to retreat when King Harold called out land and naval forces. He moved north and after an unsuccessful attempt to get his brother Gyrth to join him, he raided Norfolk and Lincolnshire. The Earls Edwin and Morcar defeated him decisively. Deserted by his men, he fled to his ally, King Malcolm III of Scotland. Tostig spent the summer of 1066 in Scotland.

He made contact with King Harald III Hardrada of Norway and persuaded him to invade England. One of the sagas claims that he sailed for Norway, and greatly impressed the Norwegian king and his court, managing to sway a decidedly unenthusiastic Hardrada, who had just concluded a long and inconclusive war with Denmark, into raising a levy to take the throne of England. With Hardrada's aid, Tostig sailed up the Humber and Ouse, defeating Morcar and Edwin at the Battle of Fulford two miles to the south of York.

== Battle of Stamford Bridge ==
Hardrada's army and Tostig invaded York, taking hostages after a peaceful surrender and while acquiring provisions. King Harold Godwinson raced northward with an English army from London and, on 25 September 1066, surprised his brother Tostig at Stamford Bridge. Hardrada, Tostig, and many of their men were killed. The Norwegians and the Flemish mercenaries hired by Tostig were largely without armour and carried only personal weapons. The day was very hot and they had not expected resistance. Moreover, Hardrada's 11,000-man force had been split, with many guarding the Norse ships beached miles away at Riccall.

== Aftermath ==
After his death at Stamford Bridge, Tostig's body was buried at York Minster. According to the 11th-century chronicler William of Malmesbury, Tostig's body had been identified after the battle by a wart located between his shoulder-blades. Tostig's two sons fled to Norway, while his widow Judith married Duke Welf of Bavaria. The victorious Harold, at the head of troops still exhausted by their previous fight with Tostig and Hardrada, would go to confront and suffer defeat at the hands of the Normans at the Battle of Hastings nineteen days later.

Tostig had two sons, probably born to an Anglo-Danish woman before his marriage to Judith; their names indicate an Anglo-Danish ancestry. They were fostered at the Norwegian court, probably before his marriage in 1051:

- Skuli Tostisson Kongsfostre. He was the great-great-grandfather of King Inge II of Norway and Duke Skule Bårdsson, and the matrilineal great-great-grandfather of Estrid Bjørnsdotter.
- Ketil Tostisson.

== Cultural depictions ==
Fictional depictions of Tostig in literature include:

- Howarth, David (1977). 1066: The Year of the Conquest. Dorset Press. ISBN 0-88029-014-5.
- Lloyd, Alan (1990) [First published 1966]. The Making of the King 1066. Dorset Press. ISBN 0-88029-473-6.

A fictional version of Tostig is portrayed by Luther Ford in the 2025 TV series King & Conqueror.

== See also ==
- Cnut the Great's family tree
- Haralds saga Sigurðarsonar

== Other sources ==
- Barlow, Frank (1970). Edward the Confessor. Berkeley / London: (University of California Press / Eyre and Spottiswoode). ISBN 9780520016712.
- Barlow, Frank (2002) The Godwins : the rise and fall of a noble dynasty (Longman Harlow) ISBN 9780582423817
- Clarke, Peter A. (1994). The English nobility under Edward the Confessor. Oxford: Clarendon. ISBN 9780198204428
- Coyle, Mark D. (2006). Tostig Godwinsson Motives of War. ISBN 978-1-929170-28-9
- DeVries, Kelly (2003) The Norwegian Invasion of England in 1066 (Boydell & Brewer Ltd) ISBN 9781843830276
- Freeman, Edward A (1868). The History of the Norman Conquest of England, its Causes and its Results. Vol. II. The Reign of Eadward the Confessor. Oxford: Clarendon Press.
- Mason, Emma (2004) The House of Godwine : the history of a dynasty (London: Hambledon) ISBN 9781852853891
- Key, Michael John (15 July 2023). The House of Godwin: The Rise and Fall of an Anglo-Saxon Dynasty. Amberley Publishing. ISBN 978-1-3981-1727-3.

Peerage of England
Preceded by Siward	Earl of Northumbria; 1055–1065	Succeeded by Morcar
