= Carola Hicks =

British art historian

- Occupation: Art Historian

Academic background
- Education: University of Edinburgh

Academic work
- Discipline: Art History
- Institutions: Newnham College, Cambridge

Carola Hicks (7 November 1941 – 23 June 2010) was a British art historian. She was a pioneer in the field of biographies of objects, which is the exploration of the history of objects and the ways in which their reception has changed throughout time.

She was born Carola Brown in Bognor Regis, West Sussex, and educated at the Lady Eleanor Holles School and the University of Edinburgh, where she took a first in archaeology in 1964. Carola returned to Edinburgh and gained her PhD, in 1967, on "Origins of the animal style in English Romanesque art". Hicks worked at the British Museum researching the Sutton Hoo ship burial, before becoming a research fellow at Lucy Cavendish College, Cambridge, and then curator of the Stained Glass Museum at Ely Cathedral. She became a fellow at Newnham College, Cambridge, where she taught until her early death.

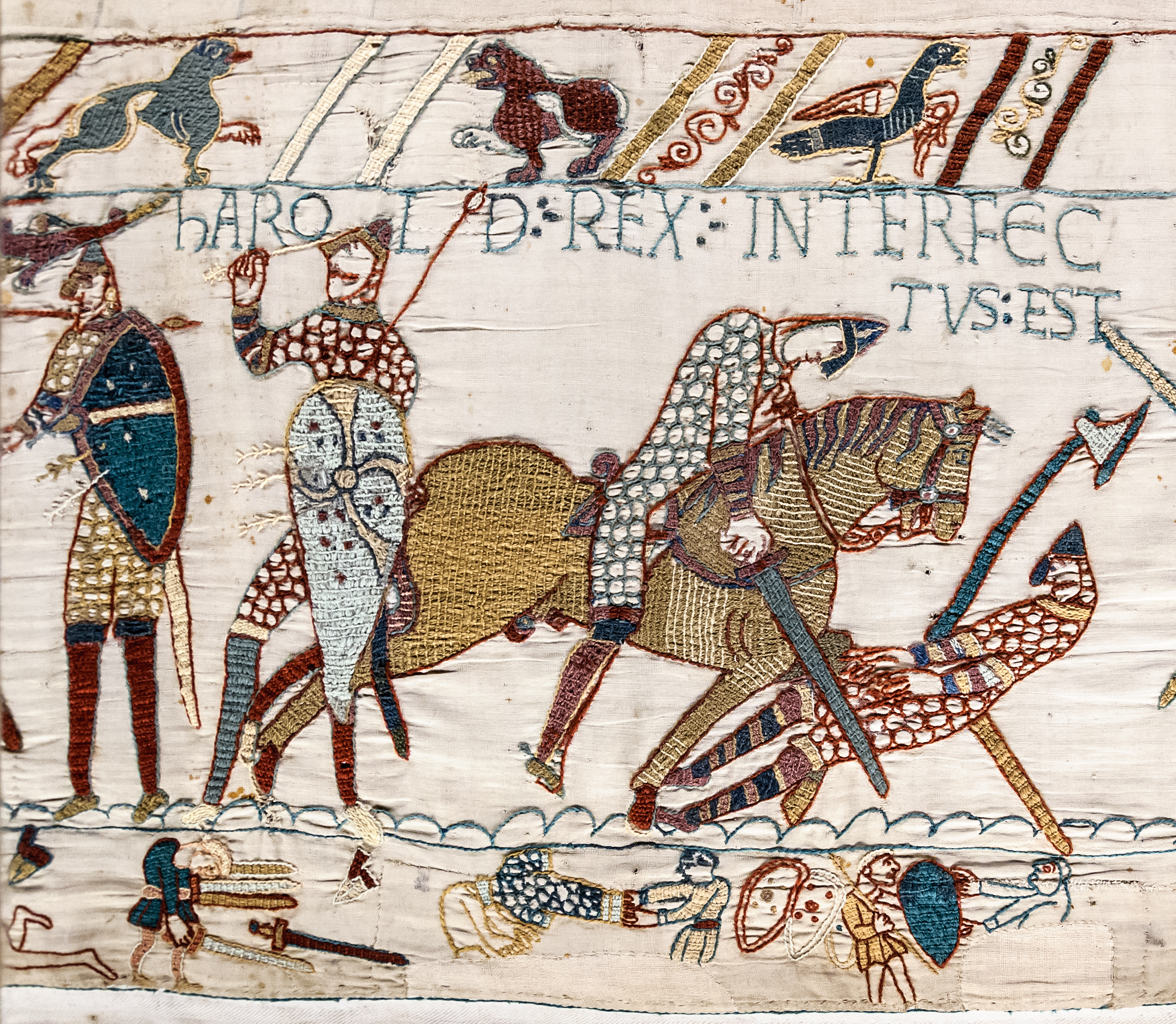
Image from Bayeux Tapestry

In 2006, her book on the history of the Bayeux Tapestry proposed a new theory on its origins, that it was commissioned in England by Edith Godwinson, the sister of King Harold and widow of Edward the Confessor.

Angela Thirlwell describes Hicks as a "glamorous academic and a serious populariser of art", who "swept the dust off old masterpieces, explained their cultural contexts and infused them with life for a new public". Her book on the stained glass of King's College Chapel at Cambridge, was serialized as the Christmas book of the week on Radio 4 in 2007, by the BBC.

== Major works ==
Hicks wrote and edited several books:

- England in the Eleventh Century (editor, 1992), from the "Harlaxton Medieval Studies" series (vol. II)
- Animals in Early Medieval Art (1993)
- Cambridgeshire Churches (editor, 1997)
- Discovering Stained Glass (2005), by John Harries and revised by Carola Hicks, from the Shire series
- Improper Pursuits: The Scandalous Life of Lady Di Beauclerk (2001), about Lady Diana Beauclerk
- The Bayeux Tapestry: The Life Story of a Masterpiece (2006), in which she suggested Edith of Wessex as the author of the Bayeux Tapestry
- The King's Glass: A Story of Tudor Power and Secret Art (2007), about the stained-glass windows of King's College Chapel
- Girl in a Green Gown: The History and Mystery of the Arnolfini Portrait (2011), about Jan van Eyck's Arnolfini Portrait. She died before the book was completed and it was finished by her Husband.
