= Beorn Estrithson =

Son of Jarl Ulf and Estrid Svendsdatter

Beorn Estrithson (died 1049) was the son of Jarl Ulf and Estrid Svendsdatter, sister of Cnut the Great.

== Life ==
Beorn established himself in England where many of his relatives held high positions. He held an Earldom (Huntingdon) in what is now the East Midlands.

In 1047, Beorn's cousin Sweyn Godwinson fled England. Along with Harold Godwinson, Beorn profited from Sweyn's absence by being awarded a share of his land.

When Sweyn returned to England in 1049 and attempted to secure a pardon from the king, Beorn and Harold refused to return any land. With three others, Beorn was guided to Bosham by Sweyn, where he was taken captive. He was sent by ship to Dartmouth, killed and his body buried.

Harold, Sweyn Godwinson's brother, later had Beorn reburied adjacent to his uncle King Cnut, in the Old Minster, Winchester.

Siward, Earl of Northumbria, has been conjectured to be Beorn's son.

Beorn may have had a son. Morkinskinna recounts an Åsmund, nephew of king Sweyn Estrithson of Denmark, explicitly describing him as son of the king's brother Beorn, yet Harald Hardrådes saga, part of Heimskringla, calls the same Åsmund the sister's son of Sweyn.
