= Wulfnoth Godwinson =

11th-century Anglo-Saxon nobleman

Wulfnoth Godwinson (1040–1094) was the youngest brother of King Harold II of England. The sixth son of Earl Godwin of Wessex, Wulfnoth was given as a hostage in childhood, and, as a result of war and political intrigue, was subsequently held in captivity for 43 years before dying, the longest-ever imprisonment of a member of British royalty.

== Biography ==
Wulfnoth was given as a hostage to Edward the Confessor in 1051 as assurance of Godwin's good behaviour and support during the confrontation between the earl and the king which led to the exile of Godwin and his other sons. Upon Godwin's return to England at the head of an army a year later, following extensive preparations in Ireland and Flanders, Norman supporters of King Edward, and especially Archbishop Robert of Jumièges fled England. It is likely at this point that Wulfnoth (along with Hakon, son of Svein Godwinson, Godwin's eldest son) was spirited away by the fleeing archbishop, and taken to Normandy, where they were handed over to Duke William of Normandy.

According to Historia novorum in Anglia by English historian Eadmer, the reason for Harold's excursion to Normandy in 1064 or 1065 was that he wished to free Wulfnoth as well as his nephew Hakon. To this end he took with him a vast amount of wealth, all of which was confiscated by Count Guy I of Ponthieu when Harold and his party were shipwrecked.

However, Harold's reasons for travelling to the continent are not clear, and there are other reasonable explanations, not the least of which was a sounding out among continental magnates of a response to his own intention to ascend the English throne at one point, given Edward's advanced age and lack of heir. When later Harold allegedly swore an oath to William agreeing to become his vassal and to support his succession to the English crown, one of the promises made by William in return, according to Eadmer, was that Wulfnoth would be returned safe and sound when William had become king. Harold's assumption of the crown broke this alleged agreement and Wulfnoth was not released until 1087, by the dying King William I in an amnesty. He was only freed briefly, before King William II Rufus took him to confinement in England.

Wulfnoth stayed in sometimes comfortable, if not enviable, captivity in Normandy and later in Hampshire and Wiltshire, and died in Winchester in 1094, still a prisoner. It is unknown if he ever fathered children.

== Popular culture ==
On screen, Wulfnoth was portrayed by Michael Pennington in the two-part BBC TV play Conquest (1966), part of the series Theatre 625.
