= Tyra of Denmark =

10th-century Queen of Norway

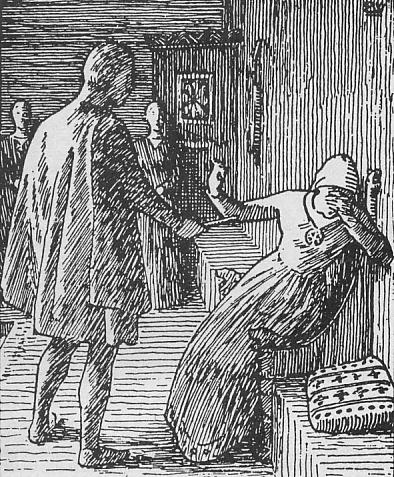
Olaf offers angelica stalks to Tyra as she weeps and scolds him for not daring to retrieve her dowry from Sweyn Forkbeard (1899)

Tyra of Denmark (Tyri Haraldsdatter, Thyri and Thyra) was a 10th-century Danish princess. She was the daughter of King Harald Bluetooth of Denmark and sister of King Swein Forkbeard.

She was first married to the Swedish prince and throne claimant Styrbjörn Starke (Styrbjörn the Strong), son of King Olof Björnsson. However Styrbjörn Starke died in the Battle of Fýrisvellir (986) near Uppsala fighting with his uncle King Eric the Victorious for the throne of Sweden.

She was then married to the Wendish king Burislav, but she loathed him and fled to marry Olaf Tryggvason, King of Norway, to the displeasure of her brother Sweyn. When Olaf married her, Sweyn refused to pay her promised dowry. Olaf subsequently set out for Wendland to seek allies for a war on Denmark. On the way Olaf was ambushed by Sweyn and an alliance which included Olof Skötkonung, King of Sweden, and Eirik Hákonarson, Jarl of Lade. The resulting Battle of Svolder ended in the death of the Norwegian king (c. 1000). According to legend, Queen Tyra subsequently committed suicide by starvation after receiving news of her husband's death at the battle.

== Other sources ==
- Alf Henrikson: Dansk historia (Danish history) (1989) (in Swedish)
- Sven Rosborn: När hände vad i Nordens historia (When did what happen in the history of the Nordic countries) (1997) (in Swedish)
- Åke Ohlmarks: FornNordiskt Lexikon (Ancient Nordic dictionary) (1994) (in Swedish)

Tyra of Denmark Born: Unknown Died: 1000
Preceded by Gunnhild, Mother of Kings	Queen Consort of Norway; 990s–1000	Succeeded by Sigrid Storråda
