= Leofwine Godwinson =

English nobleman (c. 1035–1066)

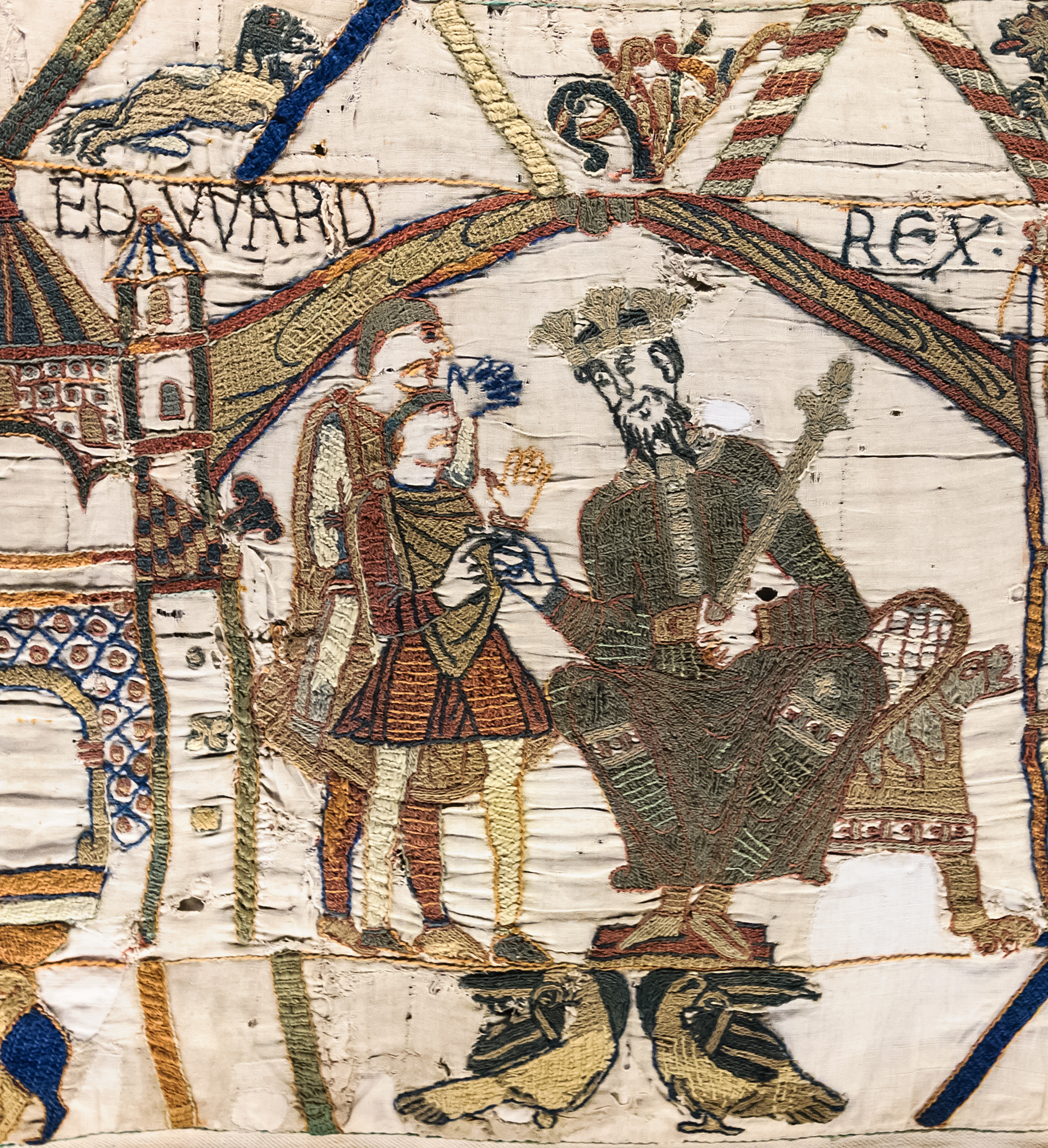

Leofwine Godwinson (c. 1035 – 14 October 1066) was a younger brother of King Harold Godwinson, the fifth son of Earl Godwin.

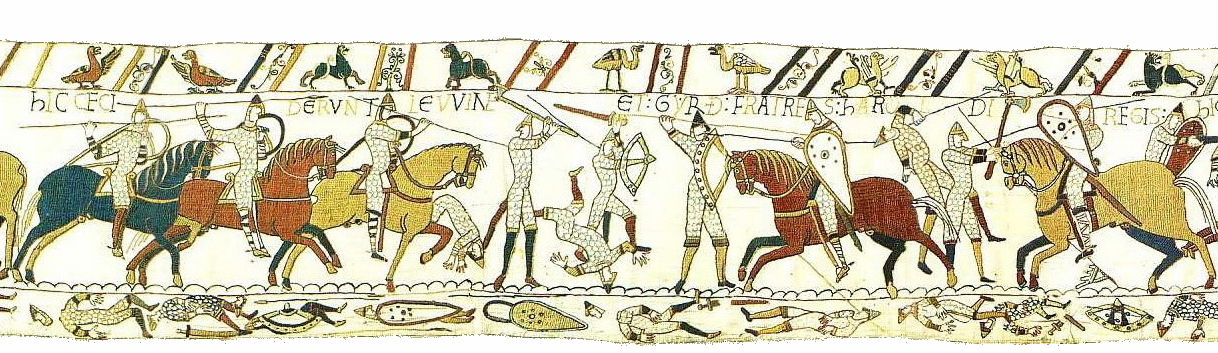
Leofwine's death at the Battle of Hastings, scene 52 of the Bayeux Tapestry. HIC CECIDERUNT LEWINE ET GYRD FRATRES HAROLDI REGIS (Here have fallen dead Leofwine and Gyrth, brothers of King Harold)

When the Godwin family was exiled from England in 1051 he went with Harold to Ireland, where they were sheltered and helped by Diarmait mac Máel na mBó, King of Leinster. He would have returned with the rest of the family the following year, but was not present at the death-bed of his father in April 1053.

Following the death of their father in April 1053, the Godwinsons managed to retain their hold on England. Harold inherited the Earldom of Wessex and became second in power only to the king. Leofwine was made Earl of Kent, Essex, Middlesex, Hertford, Surrey and probably Buckinghamshire some time between 1055 and 1057. Together with his brother Gyrth's Earldoms of East Anglia, Cambridgeshire and Oxfordshire the Godwinsons now controlled the entire East England.

He was killed alongside his brothers Harold and Gyrth in the Battle of Hastings.

Leofwine was portrayed by actor Sebastian Breaks in the two-part BBC TV play Conquest (1966), part of the series Theatre 625.

== Sources ==
- "Revealing facts about Harold Godwinson". Archived from the original on 31 March 2019.
- Barlow, Frank (ed.). Vita Ædwardi.
- DeVries, Kelly (1999). The Norwegian Invasion of England in 1066. Boydell Press. pp. 108–114. ISBN 1-84383-027-2.

Peerage of England
Preceded by Godwin	Earl of Kent; 1057–1066	Vacant Norman conquest Title next held by Odo of Bayeux
