= Gyrth Godwinson =

11th-century English earl

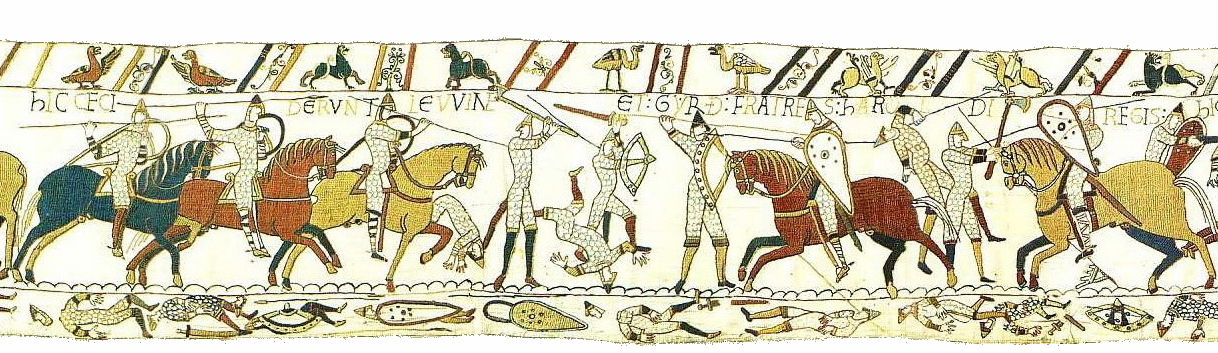
Gyrth and his brother's death at the Battle of Hastings, scene 52 of the Bayeux Tapestry. HIC CECIDERUNT LEWINE ET GYRD FRATRES HAROLDI REGIS (Here have fallen dead Leofwine and Gyrth, brothers of King Harold)

Gyrth Godwinson (Old English: Gyrð Godƿinson; c. 1032 – 14 October 1066) was the fourth son of Earl Godwin, and thus a younger brother of Harold Godwinson. He went with his eldest brother Sweyn into exile to Flanders in 1051, but unlike Sweyn he was able to return with the rest of the clan the following year. Along with his brothers Harold and Tostig, Gyrth was present at his father's death-bed and died at the Battle of Hastings.

== Biography ==
Following the death of their father in April 1053, the Godwinsons managed to retain their hold on England. Harold inherited the Earldom of Wessex and became second in power only to the king. Gyrth was made Earl of East Anglia, Cambridgeshire and Oxfordshire some time between 1055 and 1057. Together with his brother Leofwine, who was made Earl of Kent, Essex, Middlesex, Hertford, Surrey and probably Buckinghamshire, the Godwinsons now controlled the entirety of East England.

According to Orderic Vitalis and William of Malmesbury, Gyrth tried (ineffectually) to prevent Harold from engaging William of Normandy in battle, saying that he instead could lead the English forces and that he must stay in London to lead another battle and reminding him of the oath which he had sworn to William. Harold, however, ignored Gyrth's advice. Gyrth fought at and was killed in the Battle of Hastings alongside his brothers Harold and Leofwine.

== Sources ==
- Barlow, Frank (ed.). Vita Ædwardi.
- DeVries, Kelly (1999). The Norwegian Invasion of England in 1066. Boydell Press. pp. 108–114. ISBN 1-84383-027-2.

Peerage of England
Preceded by Ælfgār	Earl of East Anglia; 1057	Succeeded by ?
