= Olof Björnsson =

Swedish royal figure in medieval Norse tradition

King of the Swedes in medieval Norse tradition
- Died: Uppsala (according to Styrbjarnar þáttr)
- Spouse: Ingibjörg Þrándardóttir
- Issue: Björn, later called Styrbjörn
- Father: King Björn

Olof Björnsson (Old Norse: Óláfr Bjarnarson) is a Swedish royal figure recorded in medieval Norse sources. Knýtlinga saga calls him Óláfr Bjarnarson Svíakonungr, “Olof Björnsson, king of the Swedes”. Heimskringla, Hervarar saga ok Heiðreks and Styrbjarnar þáttr Svíakappa identify him as a son of King Björn, brother of Eric the Victorious and father of Styrbjörn the Strong.

== Medieval accounts ==
In Haralds saga hárfagra, chapter 29, Björn is described as the son and successor of Eiríkr Eymundarson and as the father of “Eiríkr the Victorious and Óláfr, father of Styrbjörn”. The opening chapter of Landnámabók likewise names Eiríkr Eymundarson in Sweden and “Björn, his son”, although it does not mention Olof in that passage.

The concluding Swedish royal genealogy in Hervarar saga preserves a different account of the preceding generations. It makes Björn the son of Eiríkr of Uppsala, who was himself the son of Önundr of Uppsala. It then names Eiríkr the Victorious and Olof as Björn’s sons and Olof as the father of Styrbjörn the Strong. The difference between this genealogy and that in Heimskringla should not be harmonised.

Daniel Sävborg treats the concluding royal genealogy in Hervarar saga as part of medieval Icelandic historiography. He argues that the chronicle probably depends on the Icelandic king-list Langfeðgatal and consequently does not constitute an independent textual witness to the genealogy.

== Styrbjarnar þáttr ==
Styrbjarnar þáttr Svíakappa, preserved in Flateyjarbók, opens by stating that Eiríkr and Olof, sons of Björn the Old, jointly ruled Sweden. It says that Olof married Ingibjörg, daughter of Jarl Þrándr Súla and sister of Úlfr, and that their son was named Björn.

According to the tale, Olof “died suddenly from poison at table at Uppsala”. Eiríkr then raised Olof’s son Björn at his court. After later conflicts over Björn’s claimed inheritance, Eiríkr gave him the name Styrbjörn. Styrbjörn subsequently returned to Sweden with an army and fought Eiríkr at Fýrisvellir. The battle therefore occurs in the narrative years after Olof’s death and does not involve Olof personally.

== Distinction from Olof Skötkonung ==
Olof Björnsson is not the same figure as Olof Skötkonung. Hervarar saga identifies Olof Skötkonung as the son of Eiríkr the Victorious and Sigríðr the Haughty, and places his accession after Eiríkr’s death.

== See also ==
- Early Swedish History
