= Estrid Svendsdatter =

Danish princess and titular queen

- Danish princess; titular queen
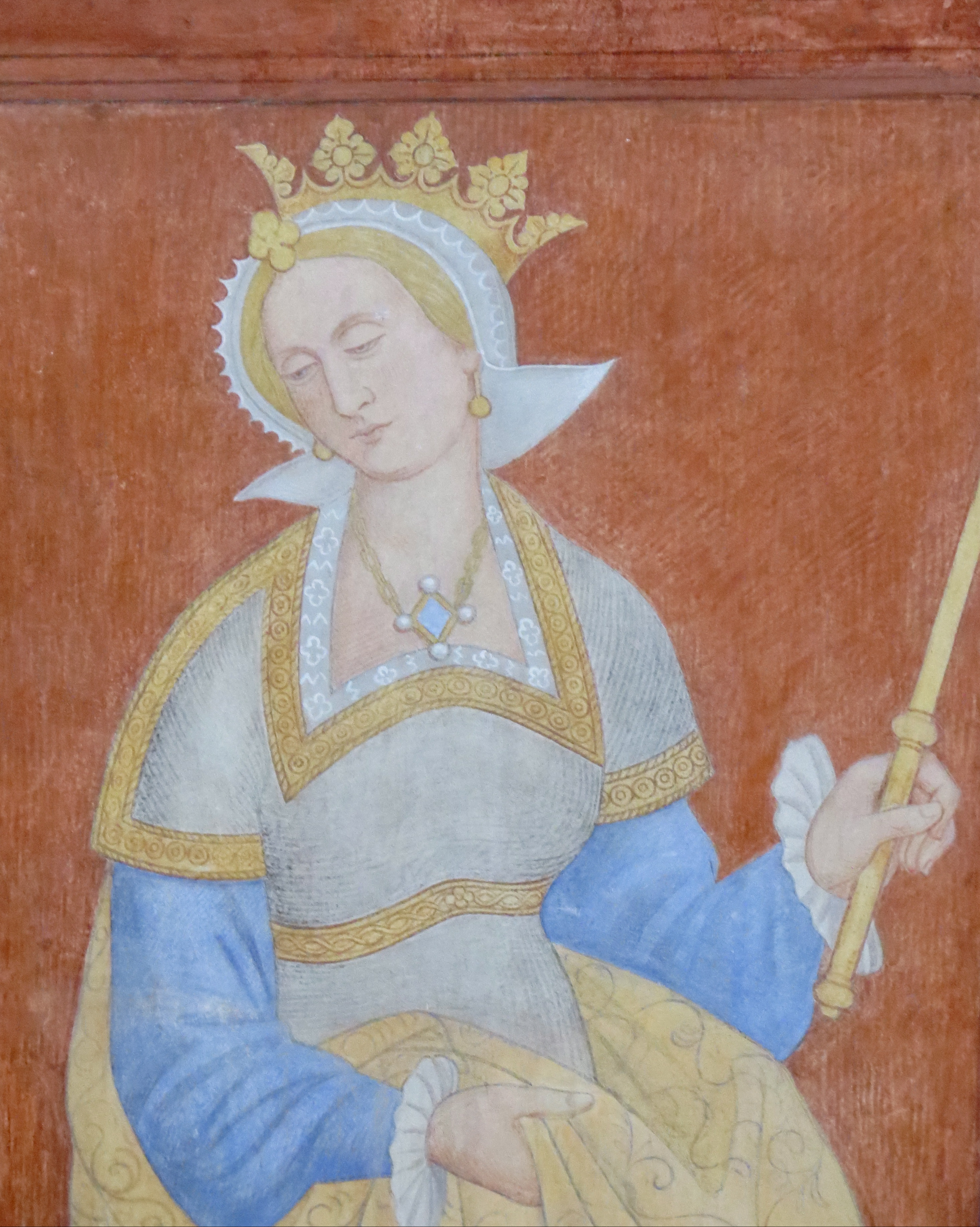
- Estrid-Margaret as depicted in the 16th century on a wall in Roskilde Cathedral.
- Born: Æstriðr Sveinsdóttir c. 990/997; Denmark
- Died: after 1057 (perhaps c. 1073)
- Burial: Roskilde Cathedral
- Spouse: Robert I of Normandy (or his father Richard II); Ulf Thorgilsson
- Issue: Sweyn II of Denmark; Beorn Estrithson; Asbjørn Estrithson
- House: Knýtlinga; Estridsen (founder)
- Father: Sweyn Forkbeard
- Mother: Sigrid the Haughty
- Religion: Christianity

Estrid Svendsdatter of Denmark (also known as Estrith or Astrith; sometimes called Margaret); fl. 1017–1032;, b. c. 990s, d. after 1057 and before 1073, was a prominent Danish princess and titular queen of the Jelling dynasty, sister of Cnut the Great and wife of the magnate Ulf Jarl. She was the mother of Sweyn II Estridsen, during whose reign she was commonly styled dronning (“queen”) in Denmark, though she was never queen regnant nor a king's consort. Through Estrid, Sweyn traced his claim to the Danish throne and founded the matronymic House of Estridsen ("son of Estrid"), which ruled from 1047 to 1412.

After the death of her father Swein Forkbeard in 1014, Estrid came under Cnut's guardianship. He married her to a son of Grand Prince Vladimir the Great or Yaroslav the Wise, but the prince died shortly afterwards. Several western chroniclers, including Rodulfus Glaber and Adam of Bremen, record a proposed or short-lived marriage with the duke of Normandy (probably Robert I, Duke of Normandy), though the precise details remain uncertain. By the early 1020s, she was married to the English magnate Ulf Thorgilsson, who later served as regent in Denmark. By marriage she was thus, successively, a Russian princess, duchess of Normandy and a Danish noblewoman.

Increasing tensions between King Cnut and Jarl Ulf culminated in Ulf's killing at Roskilde in 1026, but Cnut's trust in Estrid was undiminished. Some modern scholars suggest that Estrid may have acquiesced in the act, but sources remain inconclusive. She retained her status and was charged with supporting Harthacnut's rule. As compensation, she received large estates in Scania and on Zealand, making her one of the wealthiest women of her time. Much of this property was granted to Roskilde Cathedral, where she is traditionally credited with replacing its timber church with the first stone church in Denmark. Her later life is scarcely documented, though she evidently supported her son Sweyn II's rise to power, and was praised by Pope Gregory VII.

Estrid is regarded as one of the prominent female figures of the transitional era between the pagan Viking Age and the Christian Middle Ages. Through her son Sweyn II, she re-established the line of descent from Gorm the Old within the Danish royal house, and all subsequent Danish monarchs are descendants of her. She died in the latter half of the 11th century, and was buried as one of the first Danish royals in Roskilde Cathedral.

== Names and identity ==
Medieval sources variously call her Estrid/Estrith, Astrid/Astrith but also Margareta/Margaret. Adam of Bremen uses Margareta as her Christian name, stating that Estrid was her pagan name. Most Danish sources and later Latin works use Estrid/Estrith.

== Family, parentage and early life ==
She was a daughter of Sweyn Forkbeard. Her mother's name is not known, but she was a sister of a sister of Boleslaus, ruler of Poland and the widow of Erik, who was king of the Svear in eastern Sweden.

According to the Knýtlinga saga and other saga traditions, including the Morkinskinna, the Saga of Magnus the Good and the Saga of Haraldr harðráði in the Heimskringla, her mother was Sigrid Storråda, widow of King Eric the Victorious of Sweden, which would make Estrid a half-sister of King Olof Skötkonung. This version of her parentage was widely accepted in later Scandinavian historiography, and is also supported by the fact that her son Sweyn II's marriage to Gunnhildr Sveinsdóttir was contested by Archbishop Adalbert of Hamburg-Bremen, and ultimately annulled by Pope Leo IX on grounds of consanguinity, as Gunnhildr was the maternal granddaughter of Olof Skötkonung, Estrid's half-brother.

Earlier Danish scholarship sometimes advanced a different identification, claiming that her mother was Sweyn’s first consort, the Polish princess Gunhild (Świętosława), daughter of Mieszko I of Poland. This view, advanced by historian P. F. Suhm and likely prompted by the fact that Estrid is invariably described as Cnut’s sister, has since been rejected for lack of support in primary sources.

Paternally, her half-siblings were Canute the Great, Harald II, and Świętosława. Her father, Sweyn Forkbeard died in 1014 in Lincoln, England, after which she was placed under the guardianship of her half-brother, king Cnut.

== Reported betrothals and marriages ==
Modern scholarship generally agrees that Estrid contracted three marriages, a Rus' prince, a Norman duke, and Ulf Jarl, but their sequence is uncertain. Some accounts place the Rus' marriage first, followed by a short-lived Norman match and then her marriage to Ulf, while others treat the Norman connection as either preceding Ulf (c. 1017–1018) or following his death (c. 1027–1033). The evidence is late and contradictory, and the precise order of her early marriages cannot be established with certainty.

=== Russian prince ===
According to a scholion added in the 1080s to Adam of Bremen's Gesta Hammaburgensis ecclesiae pontificum, King Cnut "gave his sister Estrid in marriage to the son of the king of Russia." On this basis, some modern scholars, following a proposal by Alexandr Nazarenko and later supported by Leontii Voytovych, have identified the groom as Prince Il'ya (Elias) Yaroslavich (Yaroslav) of Novgorod (d. 1020), a son of Yaroslav the Wise by a mistress or by an earlier, otherwise unknown wife. The theory dates the marriage roughly to 1019–1020 and assumes that Estrid returned to Denmark after Il'ya's death. The Rus' chronicles do not name Estrid. Adam made additions (scholia) to the Gesta until his death (possibly 1081; before 1085), and although this scholion is brief and otherwise unattested, scholars accord it some weight because one of his principal informants was Sweyn II Estridsen, Estrid’s son. Some scholars, including Peter Lawætz, argue that perhaps the marriage was intended to provide her husband with Scandinavian military support for his attempt to regain Kiev after his expulsion in 1018. Indeed, it is known that Danish Varangians were present in Kiev in 1018. Prince Il'ya died in 1020, and they had no known children.

Earlier scholarship proposed a marriage in 1014–1015, and that Estrid's Rus' husband was one of the four sons of Grand Prince Vladimir the Great who were killed in the civil wars following Vladimir’s death in 1015. This interpretation would make the Rus' marriage her first, preceding a short-lived or repudiated marriage to a Norman duke (see below). An alternative proposal, advanced by P. A. Munch on the basis of a notice by Florence of Worcester, equated Adam's "son of the king of Rus'" with Bryachislav of Polotsk (a nephew of Yaroslav the Wise); this chain of identification has been largely rejected in modern scholarship.

=== Norman match ===
In 1017, Estrid's brother Cnut became King of England, and in July, he wed Queen Emma, the widow of Æthelred and daughter of Richard I, Duke of Normandy. Cnut further contracted a brief marital alliance with the Norman ducal house for Estrid, but sources disagree whether Estrid’s marriage was to Richard II or his son Robert I, and whether it occurred before or after her marriage to Ulf.

Ralph Glaber, in his Historiarum libri quinque, reported that an unnamed sister of Cnut married Robert, but Adam of Bremen reported a marriage of Estrid (calling her Margaret) to Richard II. Adam further remarks that after the duke "went to Jerusalem”" she married Ulf, an element that fits Robert I (who undertook a Jerusalem pilgrimage in 1035) rather than Richard II, and is therefore commonly treated as a conflation of names and events in Adam's narrative. Norman sources, such as William of Jumieges and Orderic Vitalis, do not mention such a marriage for either duke, and historians disagree whether it was a short-lived marriage, a betrothal, or a result of confusion.

An earlier apocryphal story states that Robert I discarded Estrid in favour of his mistress Herleva, sparking a conflict between Cnut and Normandy. According to this tale, she was supposedly ill-treated in various ways by Robert, who sent her back to England with "ignominy". Modern historians, including Frank McLynn, dismiss the story as implausible. Rudolf Glaber, by contrast, remarks that it was she who was "hateful" to him, prompting him to repudiate her. This should, however, be treated with caution, since Glaber is regarded by scholars such as David C. Douglas as an unreliable and credulous source.

Several earlier English scholars, including Frank Stenton, Edward A. Freeman, and Alistair Campbell, support the view that Estrid married Duke Robert I of Normandy, not Richard II, and that this marriage, and its subsequent repudiation, occurred after, rather than before, her marriage to Earl Ulf. David Bates likewise suggests that a brief marriage between Estrid and Robert I may have taken place around 1030 (ranging from 1027 to 1033), after Ulf's death, as part of Robert’s early ducal diplomacy. He interprets the silence of Norman chroniclers as deliberate omission, and suggests the union’s collapse reflected Robert’s refusal to dismiss Herleva.

On balance, modern works treat the episode with caution. Some Danish reference works identify the duke as Robert I, while others consider a brief or unconsummated alliance with Richard II around 1017–1018, more likely. Assessing the Norman chronology, David C. Douglas concludes that although a slightly stronger case can be made for Richard II than for Robert I, the evidence is insufficient to assert a marriage to either, and although negotiations may have taken place, the likelihood of a celebrated union and subsequent repudiation is considered unlikely. Some scholars assert that Estrid's norman match was her first, and that she was raised in Normandy, until she was rejected by her husband. In all instances, Estrid returned to England, where she would marry for a third and final time.

=== Marriage to Ulf Jarl and widowhood ===
Her brother Cnut then arranged a marriage for her with Ulf Jarl. They became the parents of Sweyn II Estridsen, Asbjørn, and Beorn Estrithson, jarl of Huntingdon in England.

In 1026, Ulf was killed by the order of Cnut. It is possible that the murder took place with her consent. She did not lose her brother's trust, and was granted large lands by him. She gave her son an education by the church, made donations to the church and is believed to have founded the first church made of stone in Denmark (Roskilde Cathedral). She supported her son's struggle to gain dominance over Denmark.

In 1047, her son became king in Denmark due to his mother's descent, and is hence known by the matronymic Sven Estridssen ('son of Estrid'). Estrid herself was granted the honorary title of Queen (not Queen mother), the very same variation of the title normally reserved for the consort of the king, and became known as "Queen Estrid", despite the fact that she was not a monarch nor the spouse of one. The idea that Estrid's son Sweyn Estrithson was offered the crown as the Confessor's successor is dismissed. Ulf's sister was Gytha married to Earl Godwin, and put her family firmly in the Anglo-Scandinavian camp.

The date of her death is unknown, but it can be no earlier than 1057 or later than 1073, as it is known that Bishop William of Roskilde officiated at her funeral, and he was in office between 1057 and 1073.

== Aftermath ==
Estrid was widely believed to have been buried in the northeastern pier of the Roskilde Cathedral, but a DNA test in 2003 dispelled the myth as the remains belonged to a woman much too young to be Estrid. The new theory is that the sign on the pier refers to Margareta Hasbjörnsdatter, who was also known as Estrid and who married Harald III Hen, the son of Sweyn Estridsen.
