= Godwin, Earl of Wessex =

Anglo-Norse nobleman (died 1053)

Godwin
- Reign: 1020–1053
- Died: 15 April 1053; Winchester, Hampshire, England
- Spouse: Gytha Thorkelsdóttir
- Issue more...: Sweyn, Earl of Herefordshire; Harold II, King of England; Tostig, Earl of Northumbria; Edith, Queen of England; Gyrth, Earl of East Anglia; Leofwine, Earl of Kent; Wulfnoth
- House: Godwin (founder)
- Father: Wulfnoth Cild

Godwin of Wessex (Old English: Godwine; died 15 April 1053) was an Anglo-Saxon nobleman who became one of the most powerful earls in England under the Danish king Cnut the Great (King of England from 1016 to 1035) and his successors. Cnut made Godwin the first Earl of Wessex (c. 1020). Godwin was the father of King Harold II (r. January – October 1066) and of Edith of Wessex, who in 1045 married King Edward the Confessor (r. 1042–1066).

== Rise to power ==
Godwin's father was probably Wulfnoth Cild, who was a thegn of Sussex. His origin is unknown but 'Child' (also written Cild) is cognate with 'the Younger' or 'Junior' and is today associated with some form of inheritance. In 1009 Wulfnoth was accused of unknown crimes at a muster of Æthelred the Unready's fleet and fled with twenty ships; the ships sent to pursue him were destroyed in a storm. Godwin was probably an adherent of Æthelred's eldest son, Æthelstan, who left him an estate when he died in 1014. This estate in Compton, Sussex, had once belonged to Godwin's father.

After Cnut seized the throne in 1016, Godwin's rise was rapid. By 1018 he was an earl, probably of eastern Wessex, and then by around 1020 of all Wessex. Between 1019 and 1023 he accompanied Cnut on an expedition to Denmark, where he distinguished himself, and shortly afterwards married Gytha, the sister of the Danish earl, Ulf, who was married to Cnut's sister, Estrid.

== Reigns of Cnut's sons ==
Cnut died in 1035 and England was disputed between Harold Harefoot, Cnut's son with Ælfgifu of Northampton, and Harthacnut, his son by Emma of Normandy. Godwin supported Harthacnut, crowned king of Denmark, and as the latter was beset with a Norwegian invasion of Denmark, it was agreed that Harold should act as English regent for these two half-brothers. In 1036 Alfred Ætheling, younger son of Emma of Normandy and Æthelred the Unready, attempted an invasion of England, but he was intercepted by Godwin, who handed him to Harold Harefoot. Alfred was blinded and died soon afterwards. Godwin's responsibility for the crime was disputed, but whatever the truth it left a stain which affected his future. In 1037, with Harthacnut still in war-stricken Denmark, Harold was recognised as king, almost certainly with Godwin's support.

In 1040, Harold Harefoot died and Godwin backed the successful accession of Harthacnut to the throne of England. Following Harthacnut's death in 1042 Godwin supported the claim of Æthelred's last surviving son Edward the Confessor to the throne. Edward, who was crowned the following year, had spent most of the previous thirty years in Normandy. His reign restored to the throne of England the "native" royal house of Wessex, a branch now in blood intertwined with the Danish-Norman dynasty of Emma of Normandy.

== Later conflicts, decline, and death ==
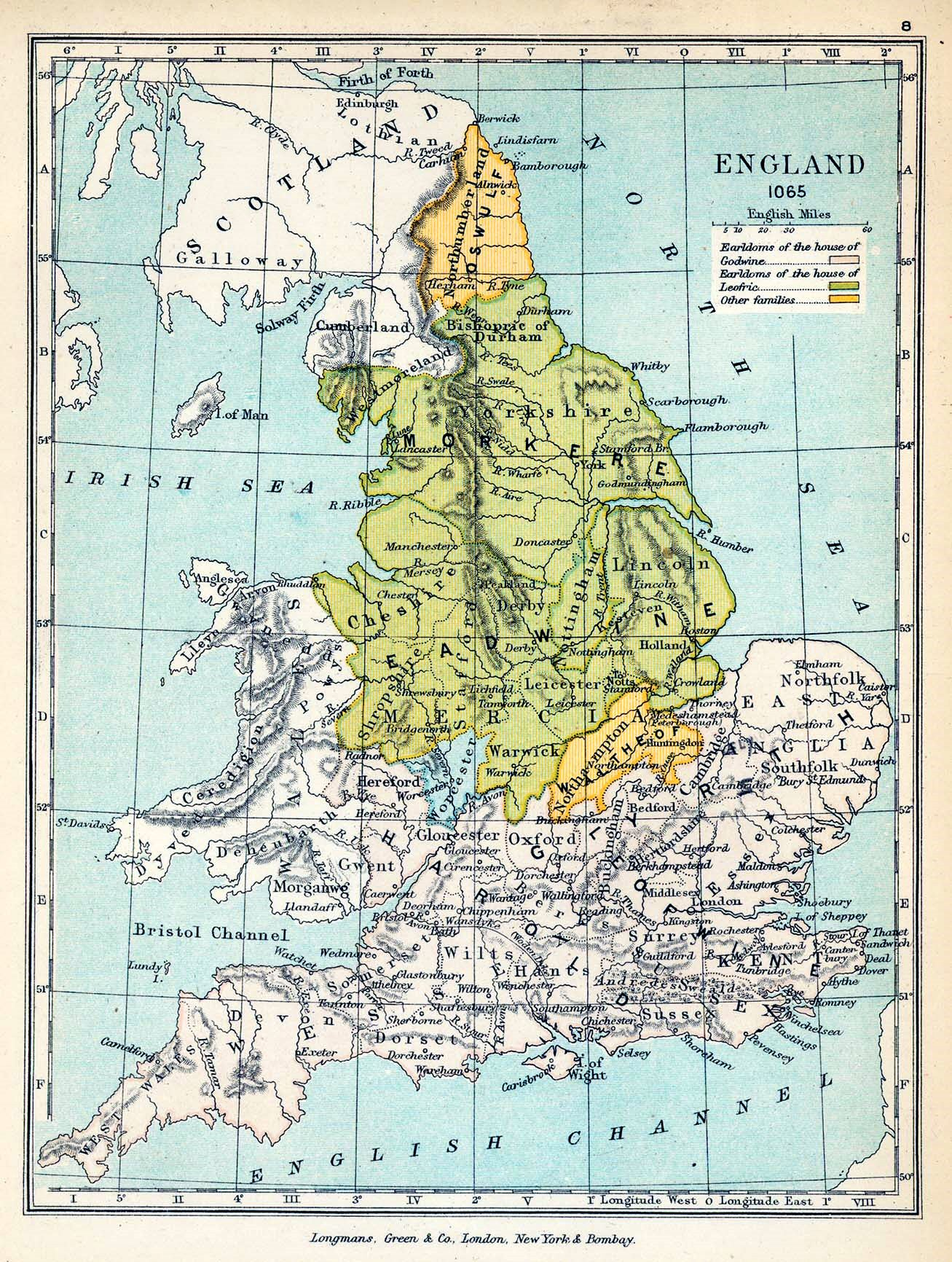
England in 1065; Earldoms in Godwin's immediate house are those east of Dehaubarth and Gwent shaded white

Soon after Edward the Confessor became king, he extended Godwin's jurisdiction to include Kent. Then in January 1045, Godwin secured the marriage of his daughter Edith (Eadgyth) to the king.

As Edward drew advisors, nobles and priests from his – and his mother's – Normano-French circle to develop his own power base, Godwin led opposition to the influx of the nascent European Norman dominion. After a violent clash between people of Dover and the visiting Eustace II, Count of Boulogne, Godwin was ordered to punish the people of Dover (as he and Leofric, Earl of Mercia had done in Worcester, in that earldom). This time, however, Godwin refused, choosing to champion his own countrymen against a visiting foreign power and defying his own king. Edward saw this as a test of power, and together with the only two earls that were not related to Godwin, Siward, Earl of Northumbria and Leofric, Earl of Mercia, raised an army at Gloucester. Godwin raised an army at Beverston. As both sides lacked the confidence to attack the other side, an agreement was reached in the end to bring the case before court in London. As Godwin was losing support, he and his family decided to flee England. His sons Leofwine and Harold fled to Dublin, where they gained the shelter and help of Diarmait mac Máel na mBó, King of Leinster. Godwin along with his wife Gytha and sons Sweyn, Tostig and Gyrth sought refuge in Flanders, where Tostig married Judith of Flanders, the half-sister of the Count of Flanders. They all returned to England in the spring of 1052 with armed forces, gaining the support of the navy, burghers, and peasants, so compelling Edward to restore the earldom.

The year after his restoration to earldom, on 15 April, Godwin died suddenly, days after collapsing at a royal banquet at Winchester. Contemporary accounts indicating that he just had a sudden illness, possibly a stroke. According to the Abingdon version of the Anglo-Saxon Chronicle, under the year 1053: "On Easter Monday, as he was sitting with the king at a meal he suddenly sank towards the footstool bereft of speech, and deprived of all his strength. Then he was carried to the king's private room and they thought it was about to pass off. But it was not so. On the contrary, he continued like this without speech or strength right on to the Thursday, and then departed this life." But according to one colourful account by the 12th-century writer Aelred of Rievaulx, which appears to be no more than Norman propaganda, Godwin tried to disclaim responsibility for Alfred Ætheling's death with the words "May this crust which I hold in my hand pass through my throat and leave me unharmed to show that I was guiltless of treason towards you, and that I was innocent of your brother's death!". The work says he then swallowed the crust, but it stuck in his throat and killed him.

His son Harold (Godwinson) succeeded him as Earl of Wessex, that is, overlord of roughly the southernmost third of England. On the deaths of Earl Siward of Northumbria (1055) and later Ælfgar, Earl of Mercia (1062), the children of Godwin were poised to take near-total overlordship of England, under the king. Tostig was helped into the earldom of Northumbria, approximating to England's northern third. The Mercian earl for the central third of England was then sidelined, especially after Harold and Tostig broke the Welsh-Mercian alliance in 1063. Harold later succeeded Edward the Confessor and became King of England in his own right in 1066. At this point, both Harold's remaining brothers in England were among his nominally loyal earls, Wessex vested in the King directly, and he had married the sister of Earl E(a)dwin(e) of Mercia and of Morcar, Earl of Northumbria (who had replaced Tostig). Thus this "House of Godwin" looked set to found a multi-generational royal dynasty, but instead Harold was overthrown and killed in the Norman Conquest.

== Family ==
=== Children ===
- Sweyn Godwinson, Earl of Herefordshire (c. 1020 – 29 September 1052)
- Harold II of England (c. 1022 – 14 October 1066)
- Edith of Wessex, (c. 1025 – 18 December 1075), queen consort of Edward the Confessor
- Tostig Godwinson, Earl of Northumbria (c. 1026 – 25 September 1066)
- Gyrth Godwinson, Earl of East Anglia (c. 1032 – 14 October 1066)
- Leofwine Godwinson, Earl of Kent (c. 1035 – 14 October 1066)
- Wulfnoth Godwinson (c. 1040 – died after 1087)
- Alfgar, possibly a monk in Rheims
- Edgiva
- Elgiva (died c. 1066)
- Gunhilda, a nun (fled to Bruges, Flanders in 1066, died there on 24 August 1087 and buried in St. Donatian's Cathedral)

=== Family tree ===
Family of Harold Godwinson

Godwin of Wessex	Gytha; Thorkelsdóttir	Earl Ulf	Estrid	Cnut the Great
Sweyn	Edyth; Swannesha	Harold; Godwinson	Ealdgyth of Mercia	Gruffydd ap Llywelyn	Tostig	Gyrth	Leofwine	Wulfnoth	Edith	Edward the Confessor
Godwin	Edmund	Magnus	Gytha	Gunhild	Ulf	Harold

== See also ==
- Ancestry of the Godwins
- House of Wessex family tree
- Cnut the Great's family tree

== Sources ==
- De Maesschalck, Edward (2019). De Graven van Vlaanderen (861-1384) [The Counts of Flanders (861-1384)] (in Dutch) (2nd ed.). DavidsFonds / Standaard uitgeverij. ISBN 9789002268458.
- Roach, Levi (2022). De Normandiërs [Empires of the Normans] (in Dutch). Amsterdam: Anthos. ISBN 978-90-263-5231-7.
- Stenton, F.M. Anglo-Saxon England (Oxford History of England), 2001.
- Thorne, J.O. and Collocott, T.C. Chambers Biographical Dictionary, Revised Edition. (Edinburgh: Chambers, 1984) ISBN 0-550-16010-8
- Walker, Ian. Harold: The Last Anglo-Saxon King, 1997.
- Weir, Alison (1996) Britain's Royal Families: The Complete Genealogy. London: Random House. ISBN 0-7126-7448-9

Peerage of England
New title	Earl of Wessex c. 1019–1053	Succeeded by Harold Godwinson
