= Sweyn Godwinson =

Eldest son of Earl Godwin of Wessex (c. 1020–1052)

Sweyn Godwinson (Old English: Swegen Godwinson) (died 1052), also spelled Swein, was the eldest son of Earl Godwin of Wessex, and brother of Harold II of England.

== Early life ==
Sweyn is first listed on a royal charter alongside his brother Harold in 1033 that was issued by King Cnut.

In 1043 Sweyn was raised to an earldom which included Gloucestershire, Herefordshire, Oxfordshire, Berkshire, and Somerset. He signed his first Royal charter in 1044.

There is some evidence suggesting that Sweyn claimed to be a son of King Canute, but his mother indignantly denied this and brought forth witnesses to his parentage.

== Focus on Wales ==
From the start, Sweyn sought peace with Gruffydd ap Llywelyn, the King of Gwynedd in northern Wales. This allowed the King of Gwynedd to gain the upper hand on Gruffydd ap Rhydderch, King of Deheubarth and his main Welsh rival. Sweyn supported the King of Gwynedd with more than words of alliance. In 1046, he joined in on an invasion of Deheubarth.

== First exile ==
On his return from this campaign Sweyn abducted Eadgifu, the Abbess of Leominster, apparently intending to marry her and gain control of Leominster's vast estate. However, King Edward refused permission and Eadgifu returned to her abbey. Late in 1047 Sweyn left England to take refuge with Baldwin V, Count of Flanders.

During his exile he travelled first to Flanders, then to Denmark before returning to England in 1049 to beg for forgiveness. He appears to have been expelled from Denmark for an unspecified offence. His brother Harold and cousin Beorn first opposed Sweyn's return, but Beorn eventually agreed to support him.

While accompanying his cousin to meet the King, Sweyn had his cousin Beorn murdered and was again exiled, condemned as a niðing, a man of no honour.

== Pardoned and restored ==
It appears that Sweyn was pardoned, despite his crimes, the following year (1050), and restored to his office. Some say it was his father Earl Godwin who pleaded his case to the King, others that it was Aldred or Ealdred, Bishop of Worcester, who met him in Flanders returning from his pilgrimage. In any case, his last stay in England would not be long.

== Exile for life ==
In 1051, Earl Godwin and all his sons were exiled from England following a dispute with the King. Sweyn received the sternest judgement of them all, and was exiled for life. Again, he travelled to Flanders – this time never to return.

== Killed on return from pilgrimage ==
It appears he was driven by remorse for his sins, as he undertook a barefoot pilgrimage to Jerusalem. It was on his return from there he was killed in 1052, although the sources differ on where. (Note: The Anglo-Saxon Chronicle states his death occurred at Constantinople, John of Worcester records it at Lycia, Asia Minor, while William of Malmesbury reports that he was killed by Saracens in the Holy Land. All three sources state Sweyn was returning from his pilgrimage.)

Sweyn had one son, Hakon, said to have been a hostage in Normandy until brought back by Harold in 1064, but nothing more is known of him.

He may also have been the father of a certain Tostig Reinald (or Hrano, Ranig), "son of Svein", who emerged from Ireland in late 1068 and unsuccessfully raided the south-west of England alongside Godwine, Edmund and Magnus, sons of Harold Godwinson.

The exile and eventual death of Sweyn left his brother Harold as the heir apparent of the Godwinson family.

== Family trees ==
- Cnut the Great's family tree

== Sources ==
- Anglo-Saxon Chronicle.
- Barlow, Frank (1970). Edward the Confessor. Berkeley, University of California Press. ISBN 978-0-520-01671-2.
- Barlow, Frank (ed.). Vita Ædwardi.
- DeVries, Kelly (1999). The Norwegian Invasion of England in 1066. Boydell Press. pp. 108–114. ISBN 1-84383-027-2.
- Williams, Ann (2023). "Swein [Sweyn], earl (d. 1052)". Oxford Dictionary of National Biography. Oxford University Press. doi:10.1093/ref:odnb/26831. (subscription, Wikipedia Library access or UK public library membership required)

Preceded by ?	Earl of Herefordshire c. 1043–1051	Succeeded by Ralph the Timid
