= Frank Barlow (historian) =

English historian (1911–2009)

Professor Frank Barlow CBE FBA FRSL

Professor of History, University of Exeter
- In office 1953–1976

Personal details
- Born: 19 April 1911 Wolstanton, Staffordshire, England
- Died: 27 June 2009 (aged 98)

Frank Barlow (19 April 1911 – 27 June 2009) was an English historian, known particularly for biographies of medieval figures. His subjects included Edward the Confessor, Thomas Becket, and William Rufus.

== Early life ==
Barlow was born in Wolstanton, Staffordshire. Both his parents were teachers. Barlow attended Newcastle-under-Lyme High School. He earned a scholarship to study History at St John's College, Oxford.

== Career ==
Barlow was professor of history at the University of Exeter from 1953 until he retired in 1976 and became emeritus professor. He was a Fellow of both the British Academy and the Royal Society of Literature, and was appointed commander of the Order of the British Empire in the 1989 Queen's Birthday Honours "for services to the study of English medieval history".

== Works ==
- The Feudal Kingdom of England, 1042–1216 (1955, 5th edition 1999)
- The Life of King Edward Who Rests at Westminster (1962, 2nd edition 1992), editor and translator
- The English Church 1000–1066 (1st edition 1963, 2nd edition 1979)
- William I and the Norman Conquest (1965)
- Edward the Confessor (Yale English Monarchs series, 1st edition 1970, new edition 1997)
- The English Church, 1066–1154 (1979)
- The Norman Conquest and Beyond (1983)
- William Rufus (Yale English Monarchs series, 1983)
- Thomas Becket (1986)
- The Carmen de Hastingae Proelio of Guy Bishop of Amiens (1999), editor and translator
- The Godwins: The Rise and Fall of a Noble Dynasty (2002)

== Festschrift ==
- Writing Medieval Biography, 750–1250: Essays in Honour of Frank Barlow (2006), edited by David Bates, Julia Crick and Sarah Hamilton
