= History of Anglo-Saxon England =

Sub-Roman Britain (410–c. 449) Heptarchy (c. 449–927) Kingdom of England (927–1066) Engla land (Old English)
- 410–1066
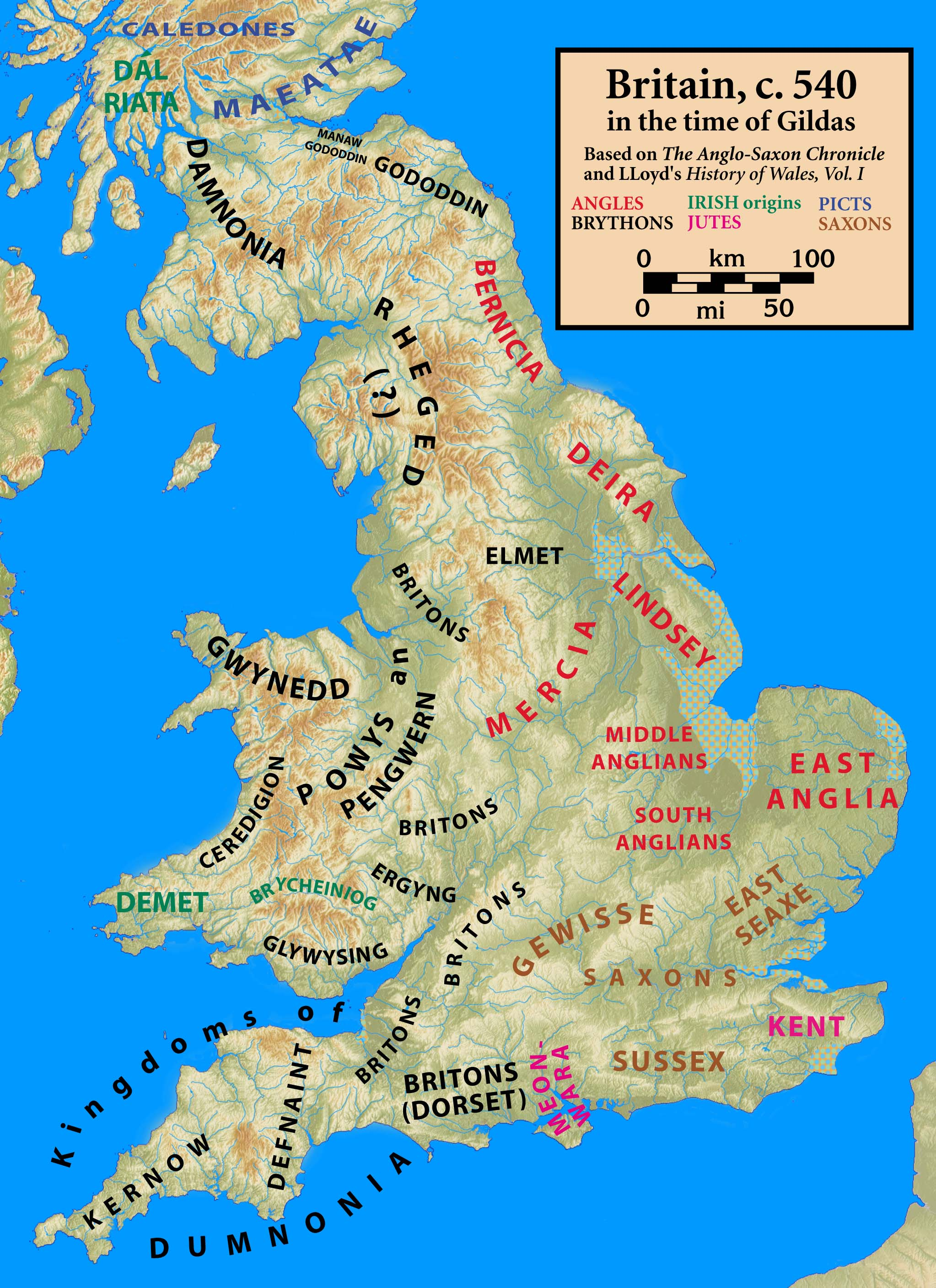
- Britain around the year 540. Anglo-Saxon kingdoms' names are coloured red. Britonnic kingdoms' names are coloured black.

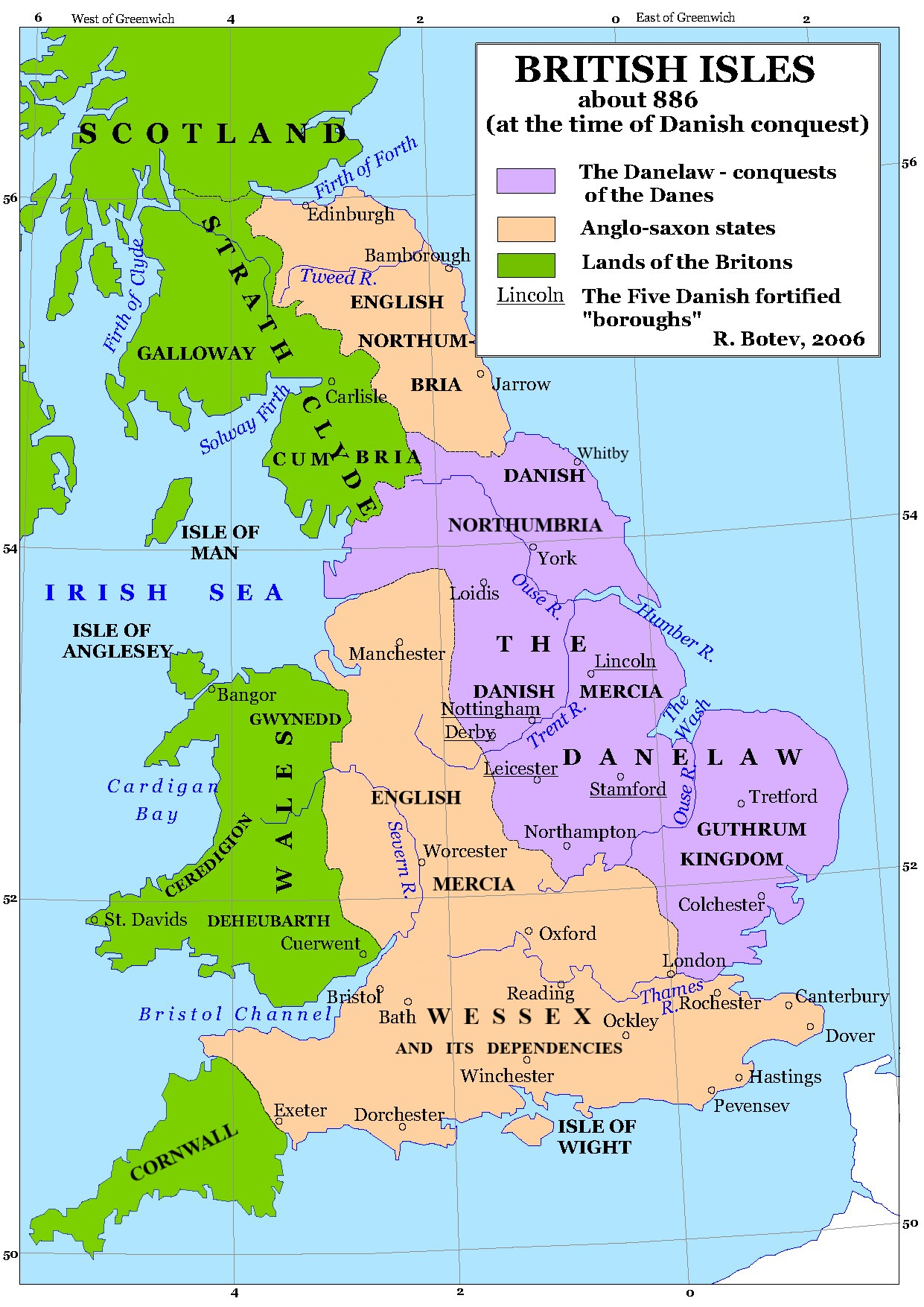
- Britain in 886, during the reign of Alfred of Wessex
- Common languages: Old English
- Religion: Christianity (from 6th century)
- Demonyms: Anglo-Saxon, Angle, Saxon, English
- Government: Heptarchy (until 927); Unitary feudal semi-elective absolute monarchy (from 927)
- King
- History
  - Abandonment of the Roman province Britannia: 410
  - Start of the Anglo-Saxon settlement of Britain: c. 449
  - Unification of the Angles, Saxons and Danes: c. 927
  - Norman Conquest: 1066
- Today part of: United Kingdom; England; Scotland

Anglo-Saxon England or early medieval England covers the period from the end of the Roman Empire's rule in Roman Britain in the 5th century until the Norman Conquest in 1066. Compared to modern England, the territory of the Anglo-Saxons stretched north to present day Lothian in southeastern Scotland, whereas it did not initially include western areas of England such as Cornwall, Herefordshire, Shropshire, Cheshire, Lancashire, and Cumbria.

The 5th and 6th centuries involved the collapse of economic networks and political structures and also saw a radical change to a new Anglo-Saxon language and culture. This change was driven by movements of peoples as well as changes which were happening in both northern Gaul and the North Sea coast of what is now Germany and the Netherlands. The Anglo-Saxon language, also known as Old English, was a close relative of languages spoken in the latter regions, and genetic studies have confirmed that there was significant migration to Britain from there which started before the end of the Roman period.

By the late 6th century, England was dominated by small kingdoms ruled by dynasties who were pagan and which identified themselves as having differing continental ancestries. A smaller number of kingdoms maintained a British and Christian identity, but by this time they were restricted to the west of Britain. The most important Anglo-Saxon kingdoms in the 5th and 6th centuries are conventionally called a Heptarchy, meaning a group of seven kingdoms, although the number of kingdoms varied over time. The most powerful included Northumbria, Mercia, East Anglia, Essex, Kent, Sussex, and Wessex. During the 7th century the Anglo-Saxon kingdoms were converted to Christianity by missionaries from Ireland and the continent.

In the 8th century, Vikings began raiding England, and by the second half of the 9th century Scandinavians began to settle in eastern England. Opposing the Vikings from the south, the royal family of Wessex gradually became dominant, and in 927 King Æthelstan was the first king to rule a single united Kingdom of England. After his death however, the Danish settlers and other Anglo-Saxon kingdoms reasserted themselves. Wessex agreed to pay gafol (Note: Funding for the Anglo-Saxon army was provided by a tax known as heregeld (army tax) that was paid at fixed times of the year. Gold and silver for Gafol was raised as required to pay off raiding Danes. This payment became more commonly known as "Danegeld" after the Norman conquest.) to the Danes, and in 1017 England became part of the North Sea Empire of King Cnut, a personal union between England, Denmark and Norway. After Cnut's death in 1035, England was ruled first by his son Harthacnut, and then by his English half-brother Edward the Confessor. Edward had been forced to live in exile, and when he died in 1066, one of the claimants to the throne was William, the Duke of Normandy.

William's 1066 invasion of England ended the Anglo-Saxon period. The Normans persecuted the Anglo-Saxons and overthrew their ruling class, substituting their own leaders to oversee and rule England. However, Anglo-Saxon identity survived beyond the Norman Conquest, came to be known as Englishry under Norman rule, and through social and cultural integration with Romano-British Celts, Danes and Normans became the modern English people.

== Terminology ==
In modern times, the term "Anglo-Saxons" is used by scholars to refer collectively to the Old English speaking groups in Britain. As a compound term, it covers the various English-speaking groups and also avoids possible misunderstandings which could come from using the terms "Saxons" or "Angles" (English)—both terms could be used either as collectives referring to all the Old English speakers or to specific tribal groups. Although the term "Anglo-Saxon" was not commonly used until modern times, it is not a modern invention because it was also used in some specific contexts between the 8th and 10th centuries.

Before the 8th century, the most common collective term for the Old-English speakers was "Saxons", which was a word originally associated since the 4th century not with a specific country or nation, but with raiders in North Sea coastal areas of Britain and Gaul. An especially early reference to the Angli is the 6th-century Byzantine historian Procopius who heard through Frankish diplomats that an island called Brittia, lying not far from the mouth of the Rhine, was settled by three nations: the Angili, Frissones, and Brittones, each ruled by its own king. (He did not use the word Saxon at all.)

By the 8th century the Saxons in Germany were seen as a distinct country, and writers such as Bede, Alcuin, and Saint Boniface began to refer to the overall group in Britain as the "English" people (Latin Angli, gens Anglorum or Old English Angelcynn). In Bede's work the term "Saxon" is also used to refer sometimes to the Old English language and to refer to the early pagan Anglo-Saxons before the arrival of Christian missionaries among the Anglo-Saxons of Kent in 597. To distinguish them, Bede called the pagan Saxons of the mainland the "Old Saxons" (antiqui saxones).

Similarly, a non-Anglo-Saxon contemporary of Bede, Paul the Deacon, referred variously to either the English (Angli) or the Anglo-Saxons (Latin plural genitives Saxonum Anglorum, or Anglorum Saxonum), which helped him distinguish them from the European Saxons whom he also discussed. In England, this compound term came to be used in some specific situations, both in Latin and Old English. Alfred the Great, a West Saxon, was, for example Anglosaxonum Rex in the late 880s, probably indicating that he was literally a king over both English (for example, Mercian) and Saxon kingdoms. However, the term "English" continued to be used as a common collective term and indeed became dominant. The increased use of these new collective terms, "English" or "Anglo-Saxon", represents the strengthening of the idea of a single unifying cultural unity among the Anglo-Saxons, who had previously invested in identities which differentiated various regional groups.

Historian James Campbell suggests that it was not until the late Anglo-Saxon period that England could be described as a nation-state. It is certain that the concept of "Englishness" only developed very slowly.

== Precursors of the Anglo Saxon era before 400 AD ==
In modern history writing the Anglo-Saxon period is said to begin following the end of Roman rule in Britain during the 5th century AD. The Anglo Saxon period is marked by economic and population collapse, and the arrival of a new Anglo-Saxon culture and language. By around AD 430, a dramatic cultural transformation had taken place in Britain, reflected in changes to burial practices, architecture, clothing, and other aspects of daily life. However, in reality the details of this transition remain uncertain, and there are indications that changes in the economic, cultural, and even linguistic situation, were changing already before 400 AD, while Britain was still within the Roman Empire. Archaeological evidence also indicates similar economic decline and cultural change was happening across the English Channel in northern Gaul, which was also still within the empire.

While there is a tradition of seeing the Anglo-Saxon language and culture as something imported suddenly after the collapse of Roman rule, Germanic soldiers from areas near the Rhine delta had been brought to Britain since the beginning of Roman rule in Britain in 43 and may have already been a significant presence in Roman society. The written record agrees with the genetic evidence that such movements of people had increased before the end of Roman rule. The term "Saxon" began to be used by Roman authors in the 4th century, initially to refer to Germanic raiders from areas north of the Frankish tribes who lived closest to the Rhine delta. 4th century Roman sources reported that these Saxons had been troubling the coasts of the North Sea and English Channel since the late 3rd century. Among the earliest such mentions of Saxons, they were named as allies of the rebel emperors Carausius, who was based in Britain, and Magnentius. At some point in the 3rd or 4th centuries the Romans established a military commander who was assigned to oversee a chain of coastal forts on both sides of the channel and the one on the British side was called the Saxon Shore (Litus Saxonicum).

According to 4th-century historian Ammianus Marcellinus, in 367 the Romano-British defences were overrun by Scoti from Ireland, Picts from northern Scotland, together with Saxons in the so-called Great Conspiracy. In 368 imperial forces under the command of Count Theodosius defeated Saxons who were apparently based in Britain, and coordinating with the Scoti and Picts. In 382 Magnus Maximus defeated another invasion by Picts and Scoti, but in the following year he led an army to Gaul for a bid to become emperor. There were further troop withdrawals in the 390s, and the last major import of coins to pay the troops took place around 400, after which the army was not paid.

== Rapid cultural change (400–550 AD) ==
The last Roman ruler of Britain, the self-proclaimed Emperor Constantine III, moved Roman forces based in Britain to the continent. The Romano-British citizens reportedly expelled their Roman officials during this period and never again re-joined the Roman Empire. Apparently taking advantage of the lack of organised military, the Chronica Gallica of 452 reports that Britain was ravaged by Saxon invaders in 409 or 410. Writing in the mid-sixth century, Procopius states that after the overthrow of Constantine III in 411, "the Romans never succeeded in recovering Britain, but it remained from that time under tyrants".

The Romano-Britons nevertheless called upon the empire to help them fend off attacks from the Saxons, the Picts and the Scoti. A hagiography of Saint Germanus of Auxerre claims that he helped command a defence against an invasion of Picts and Saxons in 429. Between 400 and 425, the archaeological record in Britain indicates a rapid meltdown of Roman material culture and trade, and its replacement by a material culture associated with the Anglo-Saxons. The Chronica Gallica of 452 records for the year 441: "The British provinces, which to this time had suffered various defeats and misfortunes, are reduced to Saxon rule." British monk Gildas, writing some generations later, reports that a message was sent to a powerful Roman leader (romanae potestatis virum) addressed as "Agitius thrice consul", begging for assistance, with no success. This is normally understood to be Aëtius, whose third consulship was in 446, implying a date between 445 and 453 when he died. The episode is sometimes referred to as the Groans of the Britons.

This having failed, Gildas reported that an unnamed Romano-British "proud tyrant" then invited "Saxons" to Britain to help defend Britain from the Picts and Scoti, working under a Roman-style military treaty as foederati, which entitled them to lands in Britain. According to Gildas, these Saxons came into conflict with the Romano-British rulers when they were not given sufficient monthly supplies. In response, they overran the whole country and then returned to their "home" (domus). After this, the British united successfully under Ambrosius Aurelianus and struck back. Historian Nick Higham calls this the "War of the Saxon Federates". There were then more wars until finally the siege at "Mount Badon", the location of which is no longer known. Gildas states that Badon was fought in the year of his birth, forty-three years earlier, and does not mention any later conflict with the Saxons.

Centuries later, Anglo-Saxon writers, in contrast, viewed the events described by Gildas as the beginning of a massive movement of people from northern Europe—an account which influences historians to this day. In Bede's account, the call to the "Angle or Saxon nation" (Latin: Anglorum sive Saxonum gens) was initially answered by three boats led by two brothers, Hengist and Horsa ("Stallion and Horse"), and Hengist's son Oisc. Some modern scholars have suggested that both "Hengist" and Oisc may represent memories of the same person as Ansehis, who was named in the Ravenna Cosmography as the chief of the "Old Saxons" who led his people to Britain, almost emptying his country.

Regarding this specific Saxon conflict reported by Gildas, modern historians remain uncertain about its timing and the relative importance it had in terms of its effect on the overall culture or population, which had begun changing rapidly already in the late 4th century. More generally, scholars continue to debate the timing and size of migrations from the continental North Sea coast. A traditional account of sudden Anglo-Saxon immigration and forced displacement or decimation of local populations has been influential since at least the eighth-century retelling of Gildas' account by Bede. In Bede's account, these events marked the beginning of a massive and violent invasion of Anglo-Saxons into Britain after the end of Roman rule in 411. The arrival of the soldiers described by Gildas became the adventus saxonum representing the main immigration event, which was followed by a period where small, pagan Anglo-Saxon kingdoms in the east fought small Christian British kingdoms in the west, and bit by bit the Anglo-Saxons defeated the British and took over a large part of Britain by force, creating England. In this traditional account, ethnic Anglo-Saxons and ethnic Britons were distinct and separate peoples, conscious of the war between their nations. By Bede's time it was assumed that after the adventus, British people living in Anglo-Saxon kingdoms had to move or else convert to a foreign culture, but modern scholars now doubt this.

A 2022 genetic study used modern and ancient DNA samples from England and neighbouring countries to study the question of physical Anglo-Saxon migration. It concluded that there was large-scale immigration of both men and women into eastern England from a "north continental" population matching early medieval people from the area stretching from northern Netherlands through northern Germany to Denmark. This began in the Roman era and experienced rapid growth in the 5th century. The burial evidence shows that the locals and immigrants were being buried together using the same customs, and that they were having mixed children. The authors estimate the effective contributions to modern English ancestry are between 25% and 47% "north continental", 11% and 57% from British Iron Age ancestors, and 14% and 43% was attributed to a more stretched-out migration into southern England, from nearby populations such as modern Belgium and France. There were significant regional variations in north continental ancestry—lower in the west, and highest in Sussex, the East Midlands and East Anglia.

Although the use of Old English during this early period cannot be conclusively demonstrated, its closest linguistic relatives—Old Frisian and Old Saxon—were spoken in these continental coastal regions, lending further support to the idea that migration played a significant role in shaping early Anglo-Saxon England.

== Anglo-Saxon kingdoms ==
There is no clear evidence concerning the origins of the later Anglo-Saxon kingdoms. The main evidence comes from Anglo-Saxon literature beginning in the 8th century, which indicates that numerous small kingdoms existed along the coast as well as inland by the 7th century. The traditional account of their origins is influenced by these Anglo-Saxon sources and indicates the kingdoms were ethnically distinct from their beginnings and initially were based on the southern and eastern coasts only. In a process that has been called an "FA cup model" these kingdoms are traditionally assumed to have started small and then gradually merged to a smaller number of larger kingdoms. One traditional term used for this period, the heptarchy, suggests the existence of seven dominant kingdoms. In fact the number of kingdoms and sub-kingdoms fluctuated during this period as competing kings contended for supremacy.

Bede reports the genealogical claims of the dynasties ruling the Anglo-Saxon kingdoms of their own time. In the semi-mythical account of Bede a bigger fleet followed the Saxons reported by Gildas, representing the three most powerful tribes of Germania, the Angles, Saxons, and Jutes, and these were eventually followed by terrifying swarms. The naming of these three specific tribes was probably influenced by the semi-mythological genealogical claims of the royal families of Bede's time. In a well-known passage, Bede gives a rough description of the homelands of these three peoples and describes the places in Britain where he believed they had settled:

- The Saxons came from what Bede calls Old Saxony and created the kingdoms of Wessex, Sussex and Essex, which have names meaning "West Saxons", "South Saxons", and "East Saxons".
- Jutland, (Note: Although Bede implies that the Jutes originated from Jutland, there is no consensus amongst historians of their origin) on the peninsula containing part of what is now modern Denmark, according to Bede was the homeland of the Jutes who he saw as ancestors of the royal families of Kent and the Isle of Wight.
- The Angles (or English) were from "Anglia", a country which Bede understands to have become empty with emigration. It lay between the homelands of the Saxons and Jutes. Anglia is usually interpreted as being near the old Schleswig-Holstein Province (straddling the modern Danish-German border) and containing the modern Angeln. (Bede also uses the term English as a collective term for the Anglo-Saxons of his time.)

The Anglo-Saxon Chronicle, written in the 9th century, reports that the various Anglo-Saxon kingdoms which eventually merged to become England were founded when small fleets of three or five ships of invaders arrived at various points around the coast of England to fight the sub-Roman British and conquered their lands. (Note: Jones suggestes that "the repetitious entries for invading ships in the Chronicle (three ships of Hengest and Horsa; three ships of Aella; five ships of Cerdic and Cynric; two ships of Port; three ships of Stuf and Wihtgar), drawn from preliterate traditions including bogus eponyms and duplications, might be considered a poetic convention.)

Southern Britain in AD 600 after the Anglo-Saxon settlement, showing division into multiple petty kingdoms

Anglo-Saxon and British kingdoms c. 800

The four most important kingdoms at first in Anglo-Saxon England were East Anglia, Mercia, Northumbria (originally two kingdoms, Bernicia and Deira), and Wessex (originally known as the Gewisse, and apparently based inland near the Thames). Minor kingdoms included Essex, Kent, and Sussex. Other minor kingdoms and territories are mentioned in sources such as the Tribal Hideage. The Anglo-Saxon Chronicle also uses the term bretwalda to refer to kings who held a dominant position over other kings in southern England, south of the Humber. The first such bretwalda that the Anglo-Saxon Chronicle named was Ælle of Sussex, who the Anglo-Saxon Chronicle describes as living in the 5th century, but accounts of this early king and his three sons are considered doubtful by modern scholars. (Note: The historian Simon Keynes suggests that the list of Bretwaldas were a "flight of fancy" by the chronicler and of no real importance to the unfolding political course.)

== "Heptarchy" and Christianisation (550-800 AD) ==
Ceawlin, king of the West Saxons, who lived in the second half of the sixth century, was the second bretwalda. According to the Anglo-Saxon Chronicle, he expanded his kingdom at the expense of British kingdoms, taking Cirencester, Gloucester and Bath as a result of the Battle of Dyrham in 577, but the historian Barbara Yorke suggests that the Chronicle may have exaggerated his achievements because he was an ancestor of later West Saxon kings. Ceawlin was defeated by the British in 584 and his reign ended in confusion and his replacement by his nephew Ceol in 591. Modern scholars note that Ceawlin's name and the names of some of his reported relatives appear to be British rather than Germanic. Why the Wessex royal house had adopted British name elements is a subject of debate.

King Æthelberht of Kent was later seen by the Anglo-Saxon Chronicle as the third bretwalda south of the Humber. Æthelberht's law for Kent, the earliest written code in any Germanic language, instituted a complex system of fines. Kent was rich, with strong trade ties to the continent, and Æthelberht may have instituted royal control over trade. For the first time, following the Anglo-Saxon invasion, coins began circulating in Kent during his reign. His son-in-law Sæberht of Essex also converted to Christianity.

In 595, Augustine landed on the Isle of Thanet in Kent and proceeded to King Æthelberht's main town of Canterbury. He had been sent by Pope Gregory the Great to lead the Gregorian mission to Britain to Christianise the Kingdom of Kent from their native Anglo-Saxon paganism. Kent was probably chosen because Æthelberht had married a Christian princess, Bertha, daughter of Charibert I, the king of Paris, who was expected to exert some influence over her husband. Augustine was given land by Æthelberht to build a church; so in 597 Augustine built the church and founded the See at Canterbury. Æthelberht was baptised by 601, and he then continued with his mission to convert the English.

After Æthelberht's death in about 616/618, the fourth bretwalda according to the Anglo-Saxon Chronicle was Rædwald of East Anglia, who also gave Christianity a foothold in his kingdom and helped to install Edwin of Northumbria who replaced Æthelfrith to become the second king over Bernicia and Deira. After Rædwald died, Edwin was able to pursue a grand plan to expand Northumbrian power.The Anglo-Saxon Chronicle lists him as the fifth bretwalda. The growing strength of Edwin forced King Penda of Mercia into an alliance with the Welsh King Cadwallon ap Cadfan of Gwynedd, and together they invaded Edwin's lands and defeated and killed him at the Battle of Hatfield Chase in 633. Their success was short-lived, as Oswald, one of Æthelfrith's sons, defeated and killed Cadwallon at Heavenfield near Hexham. Oswald subsequently became the third king of Northumbria and is listed by the Anglo-Saxon Chronicle as the sixth bretwalda.

In 635, Aidan, an Irish monk from Iona, chose the Isle of Lindisfarne to establish a monastery which was close to King Oswald's main fortress of Bamburgh. He had been at the monastery in Iona when Oswald asked to be sent on a mission to Christianise Northumbria. Oswald had probably chosen Iona because, after his father had been killed, he had fled into south-west Scotland and had encountered Christianity. He had returned determined to make Northumbria Christian. Aidan achieved great success in spreading the Christian faith in the north, and since Aidan could not speak English and Oswald had learned Irish during his exile, Oswald acted as Aidan's interpreter when the latter was preaching. Later, Northumberland's patron saint, Saint Cuthbert, was an abbot of the monastery and then Bishop of Lindisfarne. An anonymous life of Cuthbert written at Lindisfarne is the oldest extant piece of English historical writing, (Note: From its reference to "Aldfrith, who now reigns peacefully" it must date to between 685 and 704.) A gospel of Saint John (known as the St Cuthbert Gospel) was placed in his coffin, and it is the only surviving seventh-century manuscript which has an early, and probably original, binding.

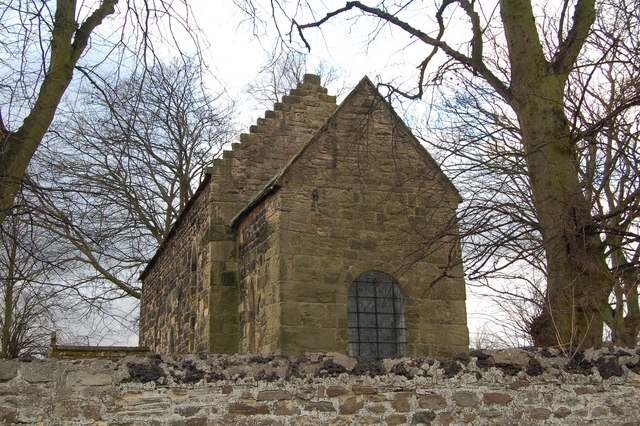
Escomb Church, a restored 7th-century Anglo-Saxon church. Church architecture and artefacts provide a useful source of historical information.

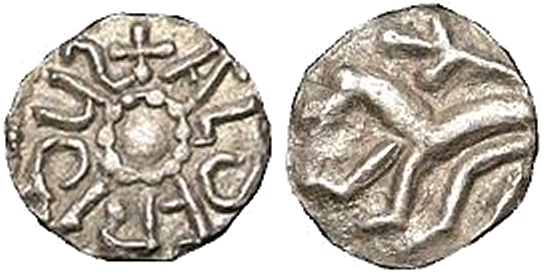
Silver coin of Aldfrith of Northumbria (686–705). OBVERSE: +AldFRIdUS, pellet-in-annulet; REVERSE: Lion with forked tail standing left

The southern kingdoms had been converted by missionaries from Rome, whereas Northumbria had been converted by Irish monks and followed the ritual and liturgy of the Irish church, which differed from Rome, especially on the date of Easter. In the mid-seventh century the Roman party became increasingly influential in Northumbria, and in 664 King Oswiu summoned a synod at Whitby Abbey to decide which rite Northumbria would follow. Bishop Wilfrid was successful in persuading King Oswiu to decide in favour of the Roman party.

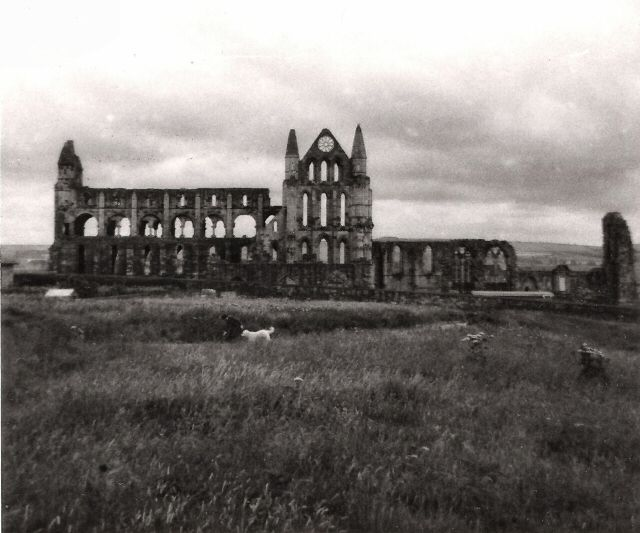
Whitby Abbey

Less than a decade after his defeat Penda again waged war against Northumbria and killed Oswald in the Battle of Maserfield in 642. Oswald's brother Oswiu was chased to the northern extremes of his kingdom. Although not included in the Anglo-Saxon Chronicle list of bretwaldas, Penda was the dominant king of the English until he was killed in battle against Oswiu in 655. Oswiu, Bede's seventh bretwalda, remained the dominant king of England until he died in 670.

The kingdom of Mercia continued its conflict with the Welsh kingdom of Powys in the 8th century. This conflict reached its climax during the reign of Offa of Mercia (reigned 757-796), who is remembered for the construction of the 150-mile-long Offa's Dyke which formed the Wales/England border. It is not clear whether this was a boundary line or a defensive position. By the middle of the 8th century, other Anglo-Saxon kingdoms of southern Britain were also affected by Mercian expansionism. The East Saxons seem to have lost control of London, Middlesex and Hertfordshire to Æthelbald, although the East Saxon homelands do not seem to have been affected, and the East Saxon dynasty continued into the ninth century.

== Ascendency of Wessex and the Vikings (9th century) ==
The ascendency of the Mercians came to an end in 825, when they were soundly beaten under Beornwulf at the Battle of Ellendun by Egbert of Wessex, who is the eighth and last bretwalda listed by the Anglo-Saxon Chronicle.

During the 9th century, Wessex rose in power, from the foundations laid by King Egbert in the first quarter of the century to the achievements of King Alfred the Great in its closing decades. The outlines of the story are told in the Anglo-Saxon Chronicle, though the annals represent a West Saxon point of view. On the day of Egbert's succession to the kingdom of Wessex, in 802, a Mercian ealdorman from the province of the Hwicce had crossed the border at Kempsford with the intention of mounting a raid into northern Wiltshire; the Mercian force was met by the local ealdorman, "and the people of Wiltshire had the victory". In 829, Egbert went on, the chronicler reports, to conquer "the kingdom of the Mercians and everything south of the Humber". It was at this point that the chronicler chooses to attach Egbert's name to Bede's list of seven overlords, adding that "he was the eighth king who was Bretwalda". Simon Keynes suggests Egbert's foundation of a 'bipartite' kingdom is crucial as it stretched across southern England, and it created a working alliance between the West Saxon dynasty and the rulers of the Mercians. In 860, the eastern and western parts of the southern kingdom were united by agreement between the surviving sons of King Æthelwulf, though the union was not maintained without some opposition from within the dynasty.

From 874 to 879, the western half of Mercia was ruled by Ceowulf II, who was succeeded by Æthelred. In the late 870s King Alfred gained the submission of the Mercians under their ruler Æthelred. Before the year 910, Æthelred ruled as "King of the Northumbrians". In 911 the medieval historian Æthelweard recorded the death of Æthelred as "Lord of the Mercians". The implication is that Æthelred had lost his kingdom when large parts of Northumbria were given up to raiding Vikings in 910. He then ruled Mercia as an Ealdorman.

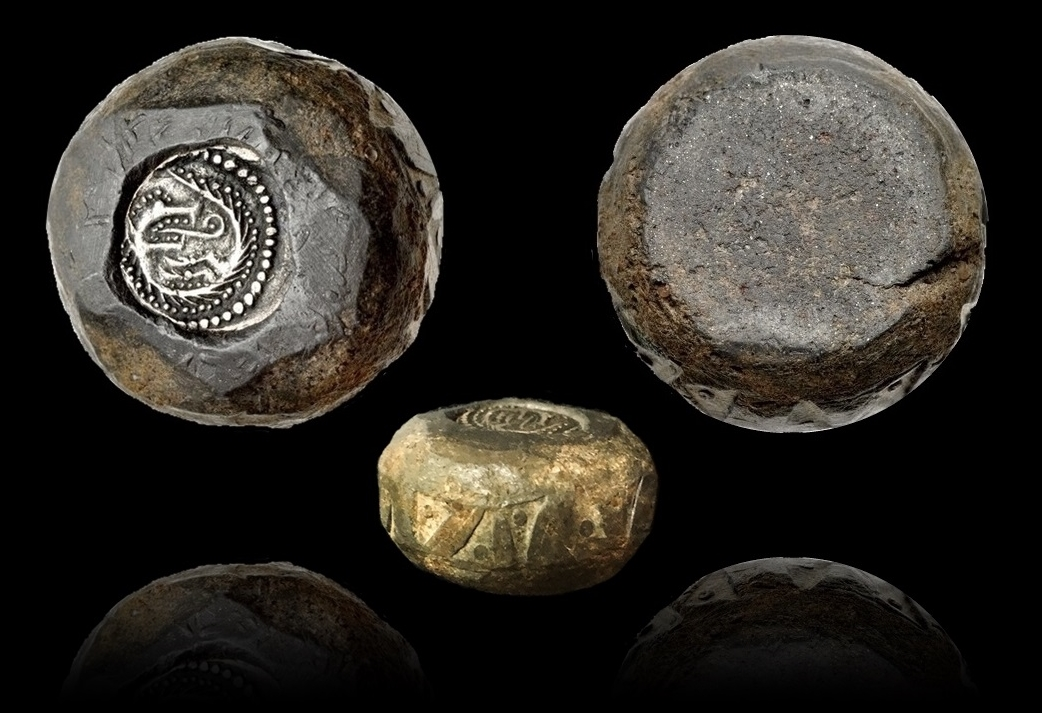
Anglo-Saxon-Viking coin weight. Material is lead and weighs approx 36 g. Embedded with a sceat dating to 720–750 AD and minted in Kent. It is edged with a dotted triangle pattern. Origin is the northern Danelaw region, and it dates from the late 8th to 9th century.

The wealth of the monasteries and the success of Anglo-Saxon society attracted the attention of people from mainland Europe, mostly Danes and Norwegians. Because of the plundering raids that followed, the raiders attracted the name Viking – from the Old Norse víkingr meaning an expedition – which soon became used for the raiding activity or piracy reported in western Europe. In 793, Lindisfarne was raided, and while this was not the first raid of its type, it was the most prominent. In 794, Jarrow, the monastery where Bede wrote, was attacked; in 795, Iona was attacked; and in 804, the nunnery at Lyminge in Kent was granted refuge inside the walls of Canterbury. Sometime around 800, a reeve from Portland in Wessex was killed when he mistook some raiders for ordinary traders. The Viking raids virtually stopped for around 40 years; but in about 835, it started becoming more regular.

Map of England in 878 showing the extent of the Danelaw

In the 860s, instead of raids, the Danes mounted a full-scale invasion. In 865, an enlarged army arrived that the Anglo-Saxons described as the Great Heathen Army. This was reinforced in 871 by the Great Summer Army. Within ten years, nearly all of the Anglo-Saxon kingdoms fell to the invaders: Northumbria in 867, East Anglia in 869, and nearly all of Mercia in 874–77. Kingdoms, centres of learning, archives, and churches all fell before the onslaught from the invading Danes. Only the Kingdom of Wessex was able to survive. In March 878, King Alfred, with a few men, built a fortress at Athelney, hidden deep in the marshes of Somerset. He used this as a base from which to harry the Vikings. In May 878, he put together an army formed from the populations of Somerset, Wiltshire, and Hampshire, which defeated the Viking army in the Battle of Edington. The Vikings retreated to their stronghold, and Alfred laid siege to it. Ultimately the Danes capitulated, and their leader Guthrum agreed to withdraw from Wessex and to be baptised. The formal ceremony was completed a few days later at Wedmore. There followed a treaty between Alfred and Guthrum which had a variety of provisions, including defining the boundaries of the area to be ruled by the Danes (which became known as the Danelaw) and those of Wessex. The Kingdom of Wessex controlled part of the Midlands and the whole of the South (apart from Cornwall, which was still held by the Britons), while the Danes held East Anglia and the North.

After the victory at Edington and resultant peace treaty, Alfred set about transforming his Kingdom of Wessex into a society on a full-time war footing. He built a navy, reorganised the army, and set up a system of fortified towns known as burhs. He mainly used old Roman cities for his burhs, as he was able to rebuild and reinforce their existing fortifications. To maintain the burhs and the standing army, he set up a taxation system known as the Burghal Hidage.These burhs (or burghs) operated as defensive structures. The Vikings were thereafter unable to cross large sections of Wessex: the Anglo-Saxon Chronicle reports that a Danish raiding party was defeated when it tried to attack the burh of Chichester. Although the burhs were primarily designed as defensive structures, they were also commercial centres, attracting traders and markets to a safe haven, and they provided a safe place for the king's moneyers and mints. A new wave of Danish invasions commenced in 891, beginning a war that lasted over three years. Alfred's new system of defence worked, however, and ultimately it wore the Danes down: they gave up and dispersed in mid-896.

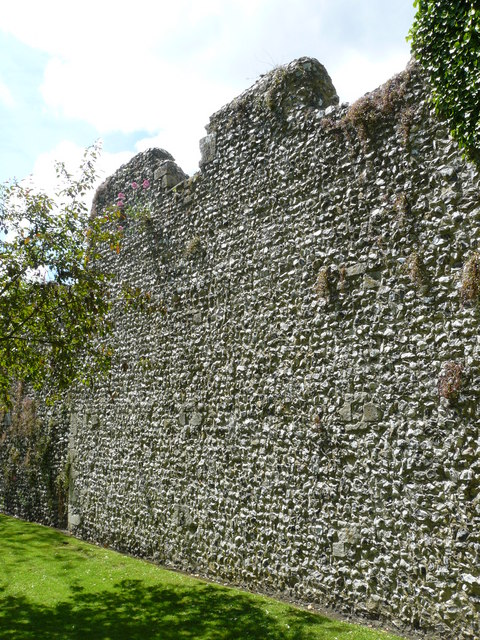
The walled defence round a burgh. Alfred's capital, Winchester. Saxon and medieval work on Roman foundations.

Alfred is remembered as a literate king. He or his court commissioned the Anglo-Saxon Chronicle, which was written in Old English (rather than in Latin, the language of the European annals). Alfred's own literary output was mainly of translations, but he also wrote introductions and amended manuscripts.

From 874 to 879, the western half of Mercia was ruled by Ceowulf II, who was succeeded by Æthelred as Lord of the Mercians.Alfred styled himself King of the Anglo-Saxons from about 886. In 886/887 Æthelred married Alfred's daughter Æthelflæd.On Alfred's death in 899, his son Edward the Elder succeeded him.

== English unification (10th century) ==
Kingdoms of Britain in 927 under Æthelstan

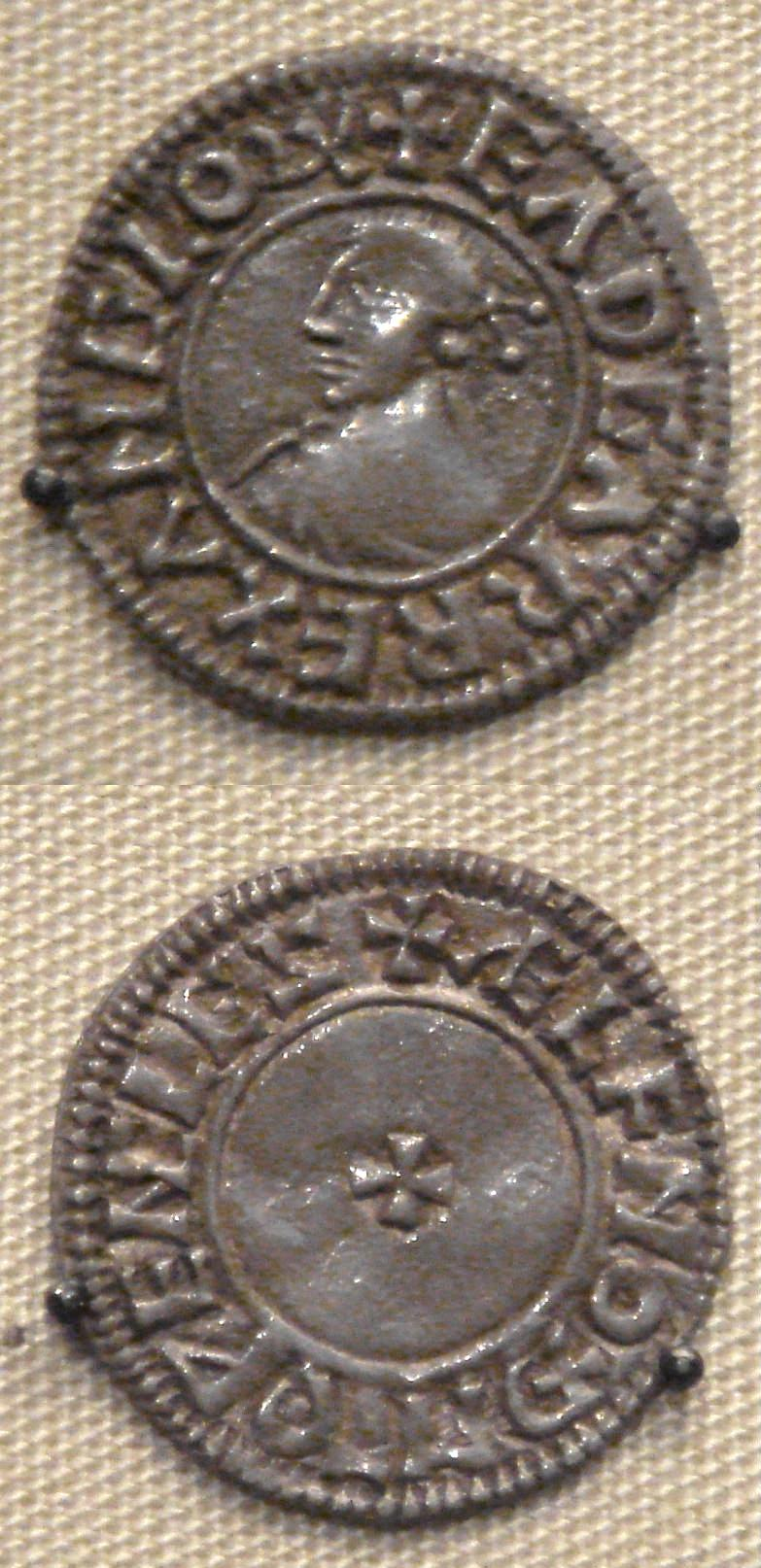
Edgar's coinage

When Æthelred died in 911, Æthelflæd succeeded him as "Lady of the Mercians",and in the 910s she and Edward recovered East Anglia and eastern Mercia from Viking rule.Edward and his successors expanded Alfred's network of fortified burhs, a key element of their strategy, enabling them to go on the offensive. When Edward died in 924, he ruled all England south of the Humber. His son Æthelstan annexed Northumbria in 927 and thus became the first king of all England. At the Battle of Brunanburh in 937, he defeated an alliance of the Scots, Danes, Vikings and Strathclyde Britons.

During the course of the 10th century, the West Saxon kings extended their power first over Mercia, then into the southern Danelaw, and finally over Northumbria, thereby imposing a semblance of political unity on peoples, who nonetheless would remain conscious of their respective customs and their separate pasts. The prestige, and indeed the pretensions, of the monarchy increased, the institutions of government strengthened, and kings and their agents sought in various ways to establish social order. This process started with Edward and Æthelflæd, who encouraged people to purchase estates from the Danes, thereby reasserting some degree of English influence in territory which had fallen under Danish control. David Dumville suggests that Edward may have extended this policy by rewarding his supporters with grants of land in the territories newly conquered from the Danes, and that any charters issued in respect of such grants have not survived. When Æthelflæd died, Mercia was absorbed by Wessex. From that point on, there was no contest for the throne, so the house of Wessex became the ruling house of England. The dominance of Wessex was reinforced by Æthelstan who drove the Danes from York in 927. During his reign he held together a composite state consisting of English, Britons and Anglo-Scandinavians, "In reality" Stenton described this as "an artificial piece of statecraft .. which depended on the strength and political ability of the reigning king". According to the historian John Blair, Æthelstan's reputation as a founder and a patroniser of religious houses, is generally well founded. During Æthelstan's reign, an English monastic reform was initiated, with the aristocratic churchmen Dunstan, Oswald, and Æthelwold as the main proponents.

When Æthelstan died in 939, there was a resurgence of Viking power that was a threat to the dominance of the new king Edmund. The Viking leader Olaf Guthfrithson arrived from Dublin and took over Northumbria with minimal opposition. In 940, his cousin, another Norse-Gael Olaf Cuaran joined him in York. It is probable that Olaf Guthfrithson died in 942 and was replaced by Olaf Cuaran. Then, in 943, the Anglo-Saxon Chronicle says that Olaf Cuaran was baptised, with Edmund as sponsor. The same year another Norse-Gael king of Northumbria was named as Ragnall Guthfrithson with Edmund standing as sponsor for his Confirmation. The chronology of events for both Olaf Guthfrithson, Olaf Cuaranths, and Ragnalls' reigns have been subject to debate; however the annals for 944 all seem to agree that Edmund was able to expel the Viking leaders from Northumbria.

The north of England was a problem for the successsors of Æthelstan. The Britons and the settled Danes, as well as some of the other Anglo-Saxon kingdoms disliked being ruled by Wessex. Consequently, the death of a Wessex king would be followed by rebellion, particularly in Northumbria. Alfred's great-grandson Edgar, at the age of 16 became king in 959, was to become known as the 'peacemaker'. After his long deferred coronation in 973 at Bath, he journeyed north to Chester where he met several northern and western kings who submitted to him. During his reign he was able to bring together and rule Wessex, Mercia and Northumbria.

Edgar was also the first monarch to identify with the English church reforms begun by Æthelstan, which were largely based on the Rule of Saint Benedict. In a formal address to a gathering at Winchester the king urged his bishops, abbots and abbesses "to be of one mind as regards monastic usage . . . lest differing ways of observing the customs of one Rule and one country should bring their holy conversation into disrepute". By the early 970s, after a decade of Edgar's 'peace', it may have seemed that the kingdom of England was indeed made whole. After his coronation, in Bath, England was ruled by Edgar under the strong influence of Dunstan, Æthelwold and Oswald.

According to the historian Rory Naismith, Edgar's reform of the English money system was one of the "most prominent legacies of the late Anglo-Saxon kingdom". The old diverse coin designs were replaced by a standardised coinage that was produced in 44 mints from York to Exeter. The coinage was then replaced every few years. A unified England thus had a unified currency. The success of this system is reflected by virtue of it continuing for approximately one hundred and fifty years after its introduction.

The presence of Danish and Norse settlers in the Danelaw had a lasting impact; the people there saw themselves as "armies" a hundred years after settlement: King Edgar issued a law code in 962 that was to include the people of Northumbria, so he addressed it to Earl Olac "and all the army that live in that earldom".

There are over 3,000 words in modern English that have Scandinavian roots, and more than 1,500 place-names in England are Scandinavian in origin; for example, topographic names such as Howe, Norfolk and Howe, North Yorkshire are derived from the Old Norse word haugr meaning hill, knoll, or mound. The interaction of Scandinavians with the Anglo-Saxons, during this period, is known as the "Viking Age" or in academic circles the Anglo-Scandinavian period.

== England under the Danes and the Norman Conquest (978–1066) ==
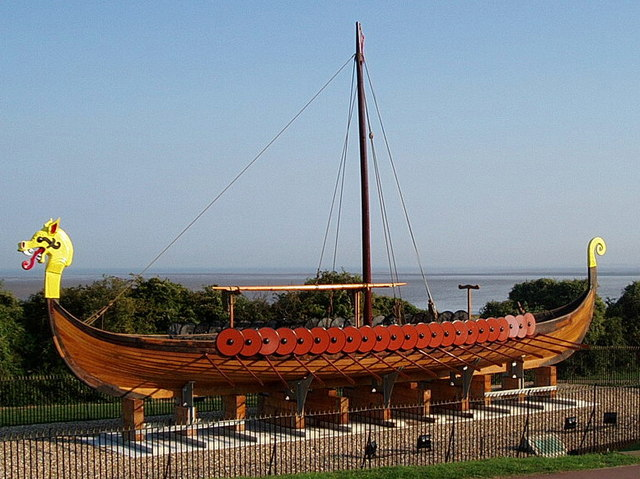
Viking longboat replica in Ramsgate, Kent

Edgar died in 975, 16 years after gaining the throne. Some magnates supported the succession of his younger son, Æthelred, but his elder half-brother Edward was elected, aged about 12. His reign was marked by disorder, and in 978 he was assassinated by some of Æthelred's retainers. Æthelred succeeded, and although he reigned for 38 years—one of the longest reigns in English history—he earned the name "Æthelred the Unready", (Note: The byname 'Unready' derives from the Anglo-Saxon word unraed, meaning "badly advised or counseled", a thirteenth-century play on Æthelred's name, which means 'noble counsel'.) as he proved to be one of England's most disastrous kings. William of Malmesbury, writing in his Chronicle of the kings of England about 100 years later, was scathing in his criticism of Æthelred, saying that he occupied the kingdom rather than governed it.

Just as Æthelred was being crowned, the Danish Harald Gormsson was trying to force Christianity onto his domain. Many of his subjects did not like this idea, and shortly before 988, his son Sweyn drove Harald from the kingdom. The rebels, dispossessed at home, probably formed the first waves of raids on the English coast. The rebels did so well in their raiding that the Danish kings decided to take over the campaign themselves.

In 991 the Vikings sacked Ipswich, and their fleet made landfall near Maldon in Essex. The Danes demanded that the English pay a ransom, but the English commander Byrhtnoth refused; he was killed in the ensuing Battle of Maldon, and the English were easily defeated. From then on the Vikings seem to have raided anywhere at will; they were contemptuous of the lack of resistance from the English. Even the Alfredian systems of burhs failed. Æthelred seems to have just hidden, out of range of the raiders.

=== Payment of Danegeld ===
By the 980s after the reform of the currency introduced by Edgar, the kings of Wessex had a powerful grip on the coinage of the realm. The system controlling the currency around the country was sophisticated; this enabled the king to raise large sums of money if needed. The need indeed arose after the Battle of Maldon, as Æthelred decided that rather than fight he would pay ransom to the Danes in a system known as gafol (Danegeld). As part of the ransom, a treaty was drawn up that was intended to stop the raids. However, rather than buying the Vikings off, it only encouraged them to come back for more. The treaty was arranged by Archbishop Sigeric of Canterbury and Ælfric and Æthelweard, the ealdermen of the two West Saxon provinces.

The Dukes of Normandy were quite happy to allow these Danish adventurers to use their ports for raids on the English coast. The result was that the courts of England and Normandy became increasingly hostile to each other. Eventually, Æthelred sought a treaty with the Normans and married Emma, daughter of Richard I, Duke of Normandy, in the spring of 1002, which was seen as an attempt to break the link between the raiders and Normandy. On St. Brice's day in November 1002, Danes living in England were slaughtered on the orders of Æthelred.

=== Rise of Cnut ===
Cnut's dominions. The Norwegian (now Swedish) lands of Jemtland, Herjedalen, Idre, and Særna are not included in this map.

In 1013 King Sven Forkbeard of Denmark brought the Danish fleet to Sandwich, Kent. From there he went north to the Danelaw, where the locals agreed to support him. He then struck south, forcing Æthelred into exile in Normandy after Christmas 1013. However, on 3 February 1014, Sven died suddenly. Capitalising on his death, Æthelred returned to England and drove Sven's son, Cnut, back to Denmark, forcing him to abandon his allies in the process.

In 1015, Cnut launched a campaign against England. Æthelred's son Edmund fell out with his father and struck out on his own. Some English leaders decided to support Cnut, so Æthelred ultimately retreated to London. Before engagement with the Danish army, Æthelred died and was replaced by Edmund. The Danish army encircled and besieged London, but Edmund was able to escape and raise an army of loyalists. Edmund's army routed the Danes, but the success was short-lived: at the Battle of Ashingdon, the Danes were victorious, and many of the English leaders were killed. Cnut and Edmund agreed to split the kingdom in two, with Edmund ruling Wessex and Cnut the rest.

In November 1016 Edmund died, and Cnut became king of all England. Cnut divided England into earldoms: most of these were allocated to nobles of Danish descent, but he made an Englishman earl of Wessex. The man he appointed was Godwin, who eventually became part of the extended royal family when he married the Cnut's sister-in-law. In the summer of 1017, Cnut sent for Æthelred's widow, Emma, with the intention of marrying her. The Encomium Emmae Reginae, which was commissioned by Emma, claims that Cnut promised to limit the English succession to the children born of their union. Cnut's first wife Ælfgifu of Northampton had borne him two sons, Svein Knutsson and Harold Harefoot, and Cnut had a son with Emma, Harthacnut.

When Cnut's brother, Harald II, King of Denmark, died in around 1018, Cnut went to Denmark to secure that realm. Ten years later, Cnut brought Norway under his control, and the following year he gave Ælfgifu and their son Svein the job of governing it, while Hathacnut ruled Denmark.

=== Edward becomes king ===
Cnut died in 1035, precipitating a succession crisis as the throne was disputed between Harold Harefoot and Harthacnut. Harthacnut was unable to come to England as he had to deal with a threat to his position in Denmark, and Harald became king. When he died in 1040, Harthacnut was able to take over as king. He quickly became very unpopular, especially for imposing high taxes. The following year Edward the Confessor was invited to return from exile in Normandy and was recognised as heir to the throne. He succeeded when Harthacnut died in 1042.

Edward was supported by Godwin, Earl of Wessex, and married the earl's daughter, Edith. In 1051 Edward's former brother-in-law Eustace came to Dover and got into a fight with the men of Dover, who killed some of Eustace's men. Dover was in Godwin's territory, and Edward ordered him to punish the town, but Godwin refused. The king, who had been unhappy with the Godwins for some time, summoned them to trial. Stigand, the Archbishop of Canterbury, was chosen to deliver the news to Godwin and his family.The Godwins fled rather than face trial. Norman accounts suggest that at this time Edward offered the succession to his cousin, William, Duke of Normandy, though this is unlikely given that accession to the Anglo-Saxon kingship was by election, not heredity—a fact which Edward would surely have known, having been elected himself by the witan. (Note: See The Norman Conquest by Marc Morris for a discussion on this.)

The Godwins threatened to invade England. Edward is said to have wanted to fight, but at a Great Council meeting in Westminster, Earl Godwin laid down all his weapons and asked the king to allow him to purge himself of all crimes.The king and Godwin were reconciled, and the Godwins thus became the most powerful family in England after the king. The value of the Godwins holdings can be discerned from the Domesday Book. On Godwin's death in 1053, his son Harold Godwinson succeeded to the earldom of Wessex; Harold's brothers Gyrth, Leofwine, and Tostig were given East Anglia, Mercia, and Northumbria, respectively. The Northumbrians disliked Tostig for his harsh behaviour, and he was exiled to Flanders in the process falling out with Harold, who supported the king's line in backing the Northumbrians.

=== Death of Edward the Confessor ===
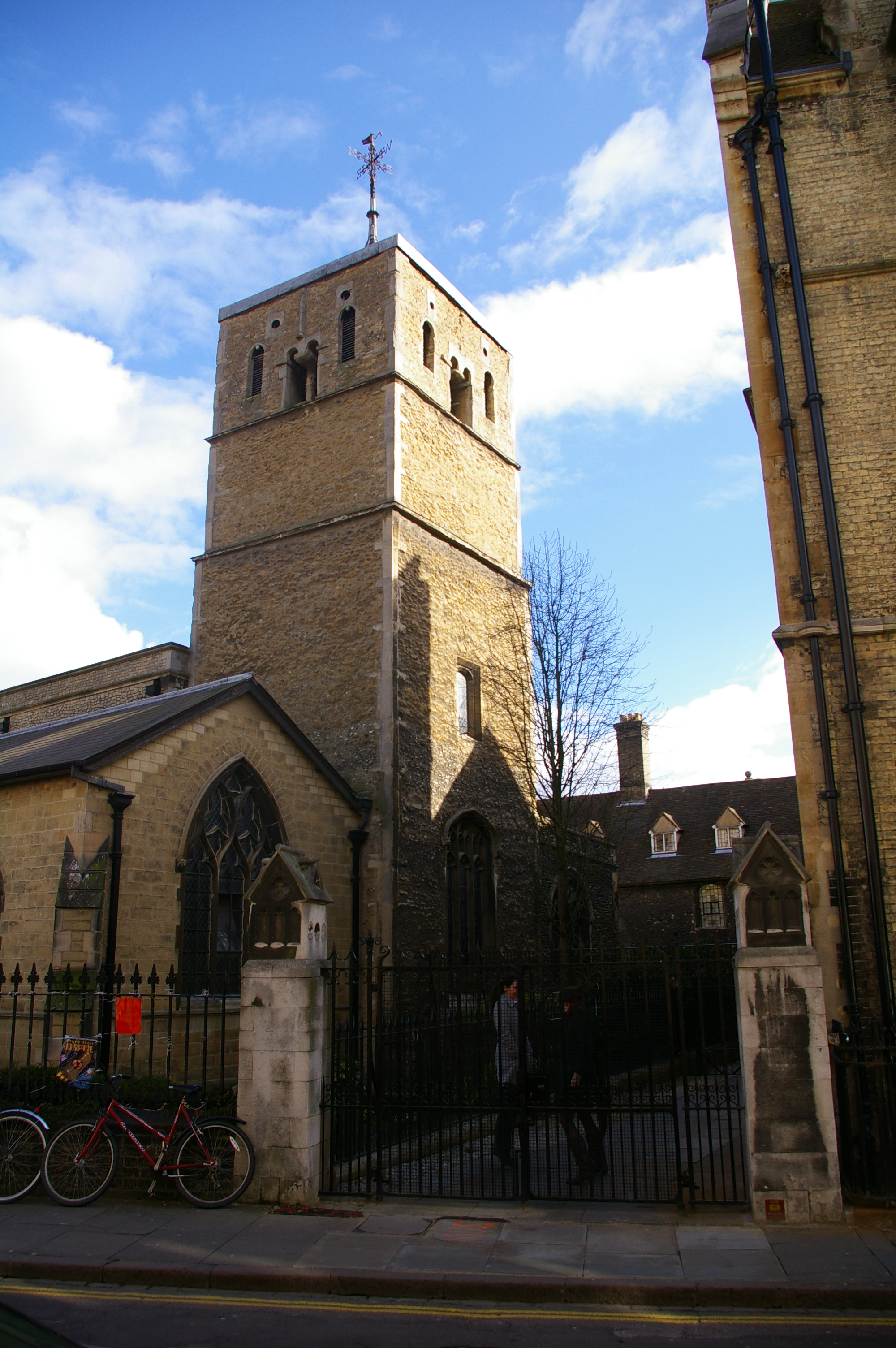
St Bene't's Church of Cambridge, the oldest extant building in Cambridgeshire; its tower was built in the late Anglo-Saxon period.

Edward died on 5 January 1066, after nominating Harold as king, and Harold accepted even though he appears to have supported the claim of William, Duke of Normandy to the throne. Harold had agreed to support William's claim after being imprisoned in Normandy by Guy of Ponthieu. William had demanded and received Harold's release, then during his stay under William's protection it is claimed, by the Normans, that Harold swore "a solemn oath" of loyalty to William. Harald Hardrada of Norway also had a claim on England, through Cnut and his successors. He had a further claim based on a pact between Harthacnut and Magnus II of Norway.

=== Battle of Fulford ===
Tostig, Harold's estranged brother, was the first to move; according to the medieval historian Orderic Vitalis, he travelled to Normandy to enlist the help of William. William was not ready to get involved so Tostig sailed from the Cotentin Peninsula, but because of storms he ended up in Norway, where he successfully enlisted the help of Harald Hardrada. The Anglo-Saxon Chronicle has a different version of the story, having Tostig land in the Isle of Wight in May 1066, then ravaging the English coast before arriving at Sandwich, Kent. At Sandwich Tostig is said to have enlisted and press-ganged sailors before sailing north where, after battling some of the northern earls and also visiting Scotland, he joined Hardrada (possibly in Scotland or at the mouth of the River Tyne).

According to the Anglo-Saxon Chronicle (Manuscripts D and E), Tostig became Hardrada's vassal and then with 300 or so longships sailed up the Humber Estuary, bottling the English fleet in the River Swale and landed at Riccall on the Ouse. They marched towards York, where they were confronted at Fulford Gate by the English forces that were under the command of the northern earls, Edwin and Morcar; the Battle of Fulford followed on 20 September, which was one of the bloodiest battles of medieval times. The English forces were routed, though Edwin and Morcar escaped. The victors entered York, exchanged hostages and were provisioned. Hearing the news whilst in London, Harold Godwinson force-marched a second English army to Tadcaster by the night of 24 September, and after catching Harald Hardrada by surprise, on the morning of 25 September, Harold achieved a total victory over the Scandinavian horde after a two-day-long engagement at the Battle of Stamford Bridge. Harold gave quarter to the survivors allowing them to leave in 20 ships.

=== Battle of Hastings and the Norman Conquest ===
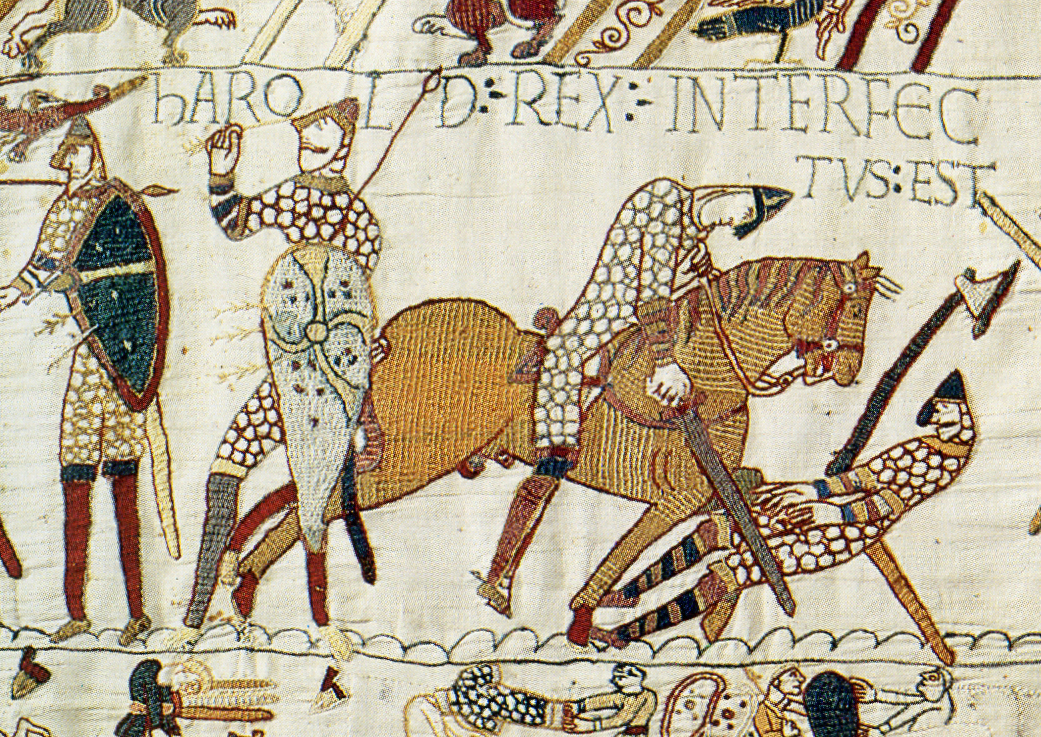
Section of the Bayeux Tapestry showing Harold (lower right) being killed at Hastings

Harold would have been celebrating his victory at Stamford Bridge on the night of 26/27 September 1066, while William of Normandy's invasion fleet set sail for England on the morning of 27 September 1066. Harold marched his army back down to the south coast, where he met William's army, at a place now called Battle just outside Hastings. Harold was killed when he fought and lost the Battle of Hastings on 14 October 1066. The Battle of Hastings virtually destroyed the Godwin dynasty. Harold and his brothers Gyrth and Leofwine were dead on the battlefield, as was their uncle Ælfwig, Abbot of Newminster. Tostig had been killed at Stamford Bridge. Wulfnoth was a hostage of William. The Godwin women who remained were either dead or childless.

William marched on London. The city leaders surrendered the kingdom to him, and he was crowned at Westminster Abbey, Edward the Confessor's church, on Christmas Day 1066. It took William a further 10 years to consolidate his kingdom, during which any opposition was suppressed ruthlessly; in a particularly brutal process known as the Harrying of the North, William issued orders to lay waste the north and burn all the cattle, crops and farming equipment and to poison the earth. According to Orderic Vitalis, the Anglo-Norman chronicler, over 100,000 people died of starvation. (Note: A translation of Vitalis, paraphrased: "His camps were scattered over a surface of one hundred miles numbers of the insurgents fell beneath his vengeful sword he levelled their places of shelter to the ground wasted their lands and burnt their dwellings with all they contained. Never did William commit so much cruelty, to his lasting disgrace, he yielded to his worst impulse and set no bounds to his fury condemning the innocent and the guilty to a common fate. In the fulness of his wrath he ordered the corn and cattle with the implements of husbandry and every sort of provisions to be collected in heaps and set on fire till the whole was consumed and thus destroyed at once all that could serve for the support of life in the whole country lying beyond the Humber There followed consequently so great a scarcity in England in the ensuing years and severe famine involved the innocent and unarmed population in so much misery that in a Christian nation more than a hundred thousand souls of both sexes and all ages perished..") Figures based on the returns for the Domesday Book estimate that the population of England in 1086 was about 2.25 million, so 100,000 deaths, due to starvation, would have equated to 5 per cent of the population. By the time of William's death in 1087 it was estimated that only about 8 per cent of the land was under Anglo-Saxon control. Nearly all the Anglo-Saxon cathedrals and abbeys of any note had been demolished and replaced with Norman-style architecture by 1200.

== See also ==
- Anglo-Saxon art
- Anglo-Saxon architecture
- Old English literature
- Anglo-Saxon monarchs
- Anglo-Saxon warfare
- Coinage in Anglo-Saxon England
- Government in Anglo-Saxon England
- History of the English penny (c. 600 – 1066)
- Prosopography of Anglo-Saxon England
- Timeline of Anglo-Saxon England

== Sources ==
- Barlow, Frank (2002). The Godwins. London: Pearson Longman. ISBN 0-582-78440-9.
- Bartlett, Robert (2000). England under the Norman and Angevin Kings. The New Oxford History of England. Oxford, UK: Oxford University Press. ISBN 978-0-19-925101-8.
- Bassett, Steven (1989). "In Search of the Origins of the Anglo-Saxon Kingdoms". In Bassett, Steven (ed.). The Origins of Anglo-Saxon Kingdoms. Studies in the early history of Britain. Leicester, UK: Leicester University Press. ISBN 0-7185-1317-7.
- Bede (1990). Farmer, D.H. (ed.). Ecclesiastical history of the English people with Bede's letter to Egbert and Cuthbert's letter on the death of Bede. Translated by Leo Sherley-Price. London: Penguin. ISBN 0-14-044565-X.
- Blair, John (2005). The Church in Anglo-Saxon Society. Oxford: Oxford University Press. ISBN 978-019-921117-3.
- Brooks, Nicholas (2003). "English Identity from Bede to the Millenium". The Haskins Society Journal. 14.
- Campbell, James (1982). "The Tomb of Saint Cuthbert". In Campbell, James (ed.). The Anglo-Saxons. London: Penguin. pp. 80–81. ISBN 978-0-140-14395-9.
- Campbell, James (2000). The Anglo-Saxon State. Hambledon: Hambledon Continuum. ISBN 1-85285-176-7.
- Cannon, John; Hargreaves, Anne (2009). The Kings and Queens of Britain. Oxford: OUP. ISBN 978-0191-72725-2.
- Charles-Edwards, Thomas (2003a). "Nations and Kingdoms: a View from Above". In Charles-Edwards, Thomas (ed.). After Rome. Short Oxford History of the British Isles. Oxford: Oxford University Press. pp. 23–58. ISBN 978-0-19-924982-4.
- Charles-Edwards, Thomas (2003b). "Conversion to Christianity". In Charles-Edwards, Thomas (ed.). After Rome. Short Oxford History of the British Isles. Oxford: Oxford University Press. pp. 103–139. ISBN 978-0-19-924982-4.
- Derolez, R. (1974). "Cross-Channel language ties". Anglo-Saxon England. 3: 1–14. doi:10.1017/S0263675100000545. JSTOR 44510645.
- Downham, Clare (2007). Viking Kings of Britain and Ireland: The Dynasty of Ívarr to A.D. 1014. Edinburgh: Dunedin Academic Press. ISBN 978-1-903765-89-0.
- Drinkwater, John F. (2023). "The 'Saxon Shore' Reconsidered". Britannia. 54: 275–303. doi:10.1017/S0068113X23000193.
- Dumville, David N. (1992). Wessex and England from Alfred to Edgar: six essays on political, cultural, and ecclesiastical revival. Woodbridge: The Boydell Press. ISBN 0-85115-308-9.
- Errington, R.M. (2006). Roman Imperial Policy from Julian to Theodosius. Chapel Hill, North Carolina: University of North Carolina Press. ISBN 978-0-8078-3038-3.
- Gildas (1978). Winterbottom, Michael (ed.). GILDAS The Ruin of Britain and other works. History of The Sources. General Editor: John Morris. Translated by Winterbottom, Michael. Chichester: Phillimore & Co. Ltd. ISBN 0-85033-295-8.
- Giles, J.A., ed. (1914). The Anglo-Saxon Chronicle . Translated by J.A. Giles. London: G. Bell and Sons Ltd. – via Wikisource.
- Gransden, Antonia (1974). Historical Writing in England c.550-c1307. London: Routledge and Kegan Paull. ISBN 0-7100-7476-X.
- Gretzinger, J; Sayer, D; Justeau, P (2022), "The Anglo-Saxon migration and the formation of the early English gene pool", Nature, 610 (7930): 112–119, Bibcode:2022Natur.610..112G, doi:10.1038/s41586-022-05247-2, PMC 9534755, PMID 36131019
- Halsall, Guy (2013). Worlds of Arthur: Facts & Fictions of the Dark Ages. Oxford University Press. ISBN 978-0-19-870084-5.
- Halsall, Paul (1996). "Alfred and Guthrum's Peace". Internet Medieval Source Book. History Department of Fordham University.
- Hawkes, Sonia Chadwick (1982). "Anglo-Saxon Kent c 425-725". In Leach, Peter E. (ed.). Archaeology in Kent to AD 1500: in memory of Stuart Eborall CBA Research Reports. Vol. Research Report Number 48. London: Council for British Archaeology. ISBN 0-906780-18-7.
- Higham, Nicholas; Ryan, Martin (2013). "Introduction". In Higham, Nicholas J.; Ryan, Martin J. (eds.). The Anglo-Saxon World. New Haven, Connecticut: Yale University Press. pp. 1–19. ISBN 978-0-300-12534-4.
- Higham, Nicholas (2013). "Britain in and out of the Roman Empire". In Higham, Nicholas J.; Ryan, Martin J. (eds.). The Anglo-Saxon World. New Haven, Connecticut: Yale University Press. pp. 20–56. ISBN 978-0-300-12534-4.
- Higham, Nicholas (1995). An English Empire: Bede and the Early Anglo-Saxon Kings. Manchester University Press. ISBN 978-0-7190-4424-3.
- Hills, C. (2003). Origins of the English. London.: Duckworth. ISBN 0-7156-3191-8.
- Hines, John (2021). "Who did the Anglo-Saxons think they were?". Current Archaeology. Archived from the original on 20 July 2026.
- Horspool, David (2006). Why Alfred Burned the Cakes. London: Profile Books. ISBN 978-1-86197-786-1.
- Jones, Michael E. (1998). The End of Roman Britain. Ithaca, NY: Cornell University Press. ISBN 978-0-8014-8530-5.
- Karkov, Catherine E (2012). "Postcolonial". In Jacqueline Stodnick; Renée R. Trilling (eds.). A Handbook of Anglo-Saxon Studies. Chichester: Blackwell Publishing Ltd. ISBN 978-1-4443-3019-9.
- Kerlouégan, François; Thomas, Rebecca (2026). "Gildas [St Gildas] (fl. 5th–6th cent.)". Oxford Dictionary of National Biography. Oxford University Press. doi:10.1093/ref:odnb/10718. (subscription, Wikipedia Library access or UK public library membership required)
- Keynes, Simon; Lapidge, Michael, eds. (1983). Alfred the Great: Asser's Life of King Alfred & Other Contemporary Sources. London, UK: Penguin Classics. ISBN 978-0-14-044409-4.
- Keynes, Simon (2001a). "Edward, King of the Anglo-Saxons". In Higham, N.J.; Hill, D.H. (eds.). Edward the Elder 899-924. London: Routledge, Taylor & Francis Group. ISBN 0-415-21497-1.
- Keynes, Simon (2001b). "Mercia and Wessex in the Ninth Century". In Brown, Michelle; Farr, Carol Ann (eds.). Mercia, an Anglo-Saxon kingdom in Europe. Londor: Continuum. ISBN 0-7185-0231-0.
- Keynes, Simon (2001c). "The Vikings in England, c. 790-1016". In Sawyer, Peter (ed.). The Oxford Illustrated History of the Vikings (3rd ed.). Oxford: OUP. pp. 48–82. ISBN 0-19-285434-8.
- Keynes, Simon (2008). "Edgar, rex admirabilis". In Scragg, Donald (ed.). Edgar, King of the English, 959-975. New interpretations. Woodbridge: Boydell & Brewer. pp. 3–59. ISBN 978-1-84383-399-4.
- Keynes, Simon (2014a). "Bretwalda or Brytenwalda". In Lapidge, Michael; Blair, John; Keynes, Simon; Scragg, Donald (eds.). The Wiley Blackwell Encyclopedia of Anglo-Saxon England (2nd ed.). Chichester, West Sussex: Wiley Blackwell. pp. 76–77. ISBN 978-0-470-65632-7.
- Keynes, Simon (2014b). "Cnut". In Lapidge, Michael; Blair, John; Keynes, Simon; Scragg, Donald (eds.). The Wiley Blackwell Encyclopedia of Anglo-Saxon England (2nd ed.). Chichester, West Sussex: Wiley Blackwell. pp. 108–109. ISBN 978-0-470-65632-7.
- Keynes, Simon (2014c). "Harthacnut". In Lapidge, Michael; Blair, John; Keynes, Simon; Scragg, Donald (eds.). The Wiley Blackwell Encyclopedia of Anglo-Saxon England (2nd ed.). Chichester, West Sussex: Wiley Blackwell. p. 240. ISBN 978-0-470-65632-7.
- Keynes, Simon (2014d). "Heregeld". In Lapidge, Michael; Blair, John; Keynes, Simon; Scragg, Donald (eds.). The Wiley Blackwell Encyclopedia of Anglo-Saxon England (2nd ed.). Chichester, West Sussex: Wiley Blackwell. p. 235. ISBN 978-0-470-65632-7.
- Lapidge, Michael; Dumville, David, eds. (1984). Gildas:New Approaches. Studies in Celtic History. Woodbridge: Boydell Press. ISBN 978-085-115403-9.
- Lawson, M. K. (2013). "Cnut [Canute] (d. 1035)". Oxford Dictionary of National Biography. Oxford University Press. doi:10.1093/ref:odnb/4579. (subscription, Wikipedia Library access or UK public library membership required)
- Lönnroth, Lars (2001). "The Vikings in History and Legend". In Sawyer, Peter (ed.). The Oxford Illustrated History of the Vikings (3rd ed.). Oxford: OUP. ISBN 0-19-285434-8.
- Martin, Kevin M. (1971). "Some Textual Evidence Concerning the Continental Origins of the Invaders of Britain in the Fifth Century". Latomus. 30 (1): 83–104. JSTOR 41527856.
- McCrum, Robert; MacNeil, Robert; Cran, William (1986). The Story of English. New York: Viking. ISBN 0-670-80467-3.
- Miller, Sean (2014). "Æthelred the Unready". In Lapidge, Michael; Blair, John; Keynes, Simon; Scragg, Donald (eds.). The Wiley Blackwell Encyclopedia of Anglo-Saxon England (2nd ed.). Chichester, West Sussex: Wiley Blackwell. pp. 16–17. ISBN 978-0-470-65632-7.
- Morris, Marc (2012). The Norman Conquest. London: Windmill Books. ISBN 978-0-09-953744-1.
- Myres, J.N.L. (1989). The English Settlements. Oxford University Press. ISBN 0-19-282235-7.
- Naismith, Rory (2014). "Prelude to reform: Tenth-Century English Coinage in Perspective". In Naismith, Rory; Allen, Martin; Screen, Elina (eds.). Early Medieval Monetary History. Studies in Memory of Mark Blackburn. Studies in Early Medieval Britain and Ireland. Farnham: Ashgate. ISBN 978-1409456681.
- Nelson, Janet L. (2004). "Æthelwulf (d. 858), king of the West Saxons". Oxford Dictionary of National Biography. Oxford, UK: Oxford University Press. doi:10.1093/ref:odnb/39264. (subscription, Wikipedia Library access or UK public library membership required)
- Ordericus Vitalis (1853). Thomas Forester (ed.). The Ecclesiastical history of England and Normandy. Vol. I. Translated by Forester, Thomas. London: Henry G. Bohn.
- Ordericus Vitalis (1854). Thomas Forester (ed.). The Ecclesiastical history of England and Normandy. Vol. II. Translated by Forester, Thomas. London: Henry G. Bohn.
- Procopius (1914). History of Wars . Translated by H. B. Dewing – via Wikisource.
- Schama, Simon (2003). A History of Britain 1: 3000 BC-AD 1603 At the Edge of the World? (Paperback 2003 ed.). London: BBC Worldwide. ISBN 978-0-563-48714-2.
- Sims-Williams, Patrick (1983). "The Settlement of England in Bede and the 'Chronicle". Anglo-Saxon England. 12: 1–41. doi:10.1017/S0263675100003331. JSTOR 44510771.
- Skråmm, Wigo; Skråmm, Yngve; Våge, Nils Steinar (2000). "Standard English words which have a Scandinavian Etymology". The Viking Network. Archived from the original on 11 February 2010.
- Snyder, Christopher A. (2003). The Britons. Oxford: Blackwell. ISBN 978-0-631-22260-6.
- Stacey, Robin Chapman (2003). "Texts and Society". In Charles-Edwards, Thomas (ed.). After Rome. Oxford: Oxford University Press. pp. 221–257. ISBN 978-0-19-924982-4.
- Stahl, Anke-Beate (2004). "Guide to Scandinavian origins of place names in Britain" (PDF). Ordnance Survey. Archived from the original (PDF) on 4 December 2008.
- Stafford, Pauline (2024). "Ælfgifu [Ælfgifu of Northampton] (fl. 1006–1036)". Oxford Dictionary of National Biography. Oxford University Press. doi:10.1093/ref:odnb/180. (subscription, Wikipedia Library access or UK public library membership required)
- Starkey, David (2004). The Monarchy of England Volume I. London: Chatto & Windus. ISBN 0-7011-7678-4.
- Stenton, F. M. (1971). Anglo-Saxon England 3rd edition. Oxford: OUP. ISBN 978-0-19-280139-5.
- Symons, Thomas (1953). Galbraith, V.H.; Mynors, R. A. B. (eds.). The Monastic Agreement of the Monks and Nuns of the English Nation (Regularis Concordia) (Medieval Classics) (English and Latin ed.). Edinburgh: Thomas Nelson & Sons. OCLC 469695298.
- Ward-Perkins, Bryan (2000). "Why did the Anglo-Saxons not become more British?". The English Historical Review. 115 (462): 513–533. doi:10.1093/ehr/115.462.513.
- Welch, Martin (1992). Anglo-Saxon England. London: English Heritage. ISBN 0-7134-6566-2.
- William of Malmesbury (1847). Chronicle of the kings of England:From the earliest period to the reign of King Stephen . Translated by Giles, J.A. London: Henry Bohn – via Wikisource.
- Williams, Ann (1979). "Some Notes and Considerations Connected with the English Royal Succession, 860-1066". Proceeding of the Battle Conference on Anglo-Norman Studies. 1: 144–233. ISBN 978-0-85115-107-6.
- Williams, Ann (2003). Æthelred the Unready: The Ill-Counselled King. Hambledon: Hambledon Continuum. ISBN 1-85285-382-4.
- Williams, Ann (2014). "Edward the Confessor". In Lapidge, Michael; Blair, John; Keynes, Simon; Scragg, Donald (eds.). The Wiley Blackwell Encyclopedia of Anglo-Saxon England (2nd ed.). Chichester, West Sussex: Wiley Blackwell. pp. 166–167. ISBN 978-0-470-65632-7.
- Wood, Michael (1985). The Domesday Quest. London: BBC. ISBN 0-15-352274-7.
- Wood, Michael (2005). In Search of the Dark Ages. London: BBC. ISBN 978-0-563-52276-8.
- Yorke, Barbara (1990). Kings and Kingdoms of Early Anglo-Saxon England. London: Taylor & Francis Ltd. ISBN 978-0-415-16639-3.
- Yorke, Barbara (1985). "The kingdom of the East Saxons". Anglo-Saxon England. 14: 1–36. doi:10.1017/S0263675100001253.
