= Ulf, son of Harold Godwinson =

Anglo-Saxon nobleman

Ulf or Wulf (fl. 1067 – 1087?) was a son of Harold Godwinson, King of England. He was captured during the course of the Norman conquest of England, and imprisoned in Normandy, being released only at the death of William the Conqueror.

== Birth and parentage ==
Ulf's family was one of the most powerful in Anglo-Saxon England: his paternal grandfather was Godwin, Earl of Wessex, and his father was Harold Godwinson, who inherited the same title and was crowned king of England at the beginning of 1066. Harold's first wife, whom he married in a form of ceremony not recognized by the church, was called Edith Swan-neck, and his second wife was Ealdgyth, sister of the earls Edwin and Morcar. Most historians believe Edith Swan-neck was Ulf's mother, but in the 19th century Edward Freeman argued that it was Ealdgyth. Frank Barlow was undecided.

Ulf's date of birth is also uncertain. If Freeman was correct then Ealdgyth must have given birth to Ulf in Chester after Harold's death, having been married to him for only a few months in total, and since she was also the mother of a son called Harold that would necessarily imply that the two boys were twins. On the other hand Ian Walker argues that he was born between 1047 and 1053. Ulf's name, a Scandinavian one, was perhaps taken from a maternal uncle of Harold Godwinson.

== Imprisonment ==
At some point in William the Conqueror's reign, perhaps during the period of confusion after the Battle of Hastings, Ulf was taken prisoner and moved to Normandy, where he remained until 1087. When William was on his deathbed he was persuaded by the church dignitaries in attendance on him to release all of his political prisoners, Ulf among them. Apparently the terms of Ulf's imprisonment had been loose enough to allow him to learn the skills of a mounted warrior, since William's successor as Duke of Normandy, Robert Curthose, knighted Ulf. He also allowed Ulf to leave Normandy, but it is not known whether he did so since there is no further record of Ulf's career.
