= Harold, son of Harold Godwinson =

Son of King of England (c. 1065–1098)

Harold
- Born: 1065; Wessex, England
- Died: 1098 (aged 32–33); Anglesey
- House: Godwin
- Father: Harold Godwinson
- Mother: Edith the Fair; Ealdgyth of Mercia

Harold (c. 1065 – 1098) was a son of Harold Godwinson, King of England. He was driven into exile by the Norman conquest of England, and found refuge at the court of the king of Norway.

== Birth and parentage ==
Harold's family was one of the most powerful in Anglo-Saxon England: his paternal grandfather was Godwin, Earl of Wessex, and his father was Harold Godwinson, who inherited the same title and was crowned king of England at the beginning of 1066. Harold Godwinson's first wife, whom he married in a form of ceremony not recognized by the church, was called Edith Swan-neck, and his second wife was Ealdgyth, sister of the earls Edwin and Morcar. Historians almost unanimously believe Ealdgyth was Harold's mother, though Ealdgyth's biographer in the Oxford Dictionary of National Biography only concedes that this is "not impossible". Harold was probably born posthumously in Chester, where his mother had fled to escape the advancing army of William the Conqueror. It has been argued that he was a twin of Ulf Haroldson, but this is considered doubtful.

== Exile ==
By late 1069, Chester was occupied by the Normans, but presumably Ealdgyth and her young son had fled by that time, and her most obvious refuge would be the Norse-Irish city of Dublin, which had previously sheltered other members of Harold's family. At some point, Harold sailed to Norway and was welcomed by the king, whose family remembered with gratitude Harold Godwinson's generosity in allowing Olaf, son of Harald Hardrada, to return home after the disastrous battle of Stamford Bridge. In 1098, he was one of the men Magnus III Barelegs took with him on an expedition to Orkney, the Hebrides, the Isle of Man and Anglesey. No further mention of Harold appears in any source.
