= House of Godwin =

Anglo-Saxon noble and royal house

- Royal and princely house
- A variety of a coat of arms attributed to Harold, King of England. This applies to the family's royal branch, not the princely branches.
- Parent family: House of Wessex (?)
- Origin: Sussex
- Founder: Godwin, Earl of Wessex
- Final ruler: Harold Godwinson (England, 1066); Margaret Skulesdatter (Norway, 1270)
- Seat: Compton; Bosham; Hougun
- Titles: King of England; Regent of England; Queen of England; Princess of Chernigov; Princess of Pereyaslav; Princess of Smolensk; Earl of East Anglia; Earl of Herefordshire; Earl of Kent; Earl of Northumbria; Earl of Wessex; Constable of Dover Castle; Constable of Saint-Omer
- Connected families: House of Estridsen; House of Earl Thorkell; House of Earl Ælfgar; House of Flanders; House of Wessex; House of Rurik
- Cadet branches: House of Gudine; House of Rein; House of Torgar

The House of Godwin (Old English: Godƿine) was the house consisting of the Anglo-Saxon family who were one of the leading noble families in England during the last fifty years before the Norman Conquest. Its most famous member was Harold Godwinson, King of England for nine months in 1066.

The founder of the family's greatness, Earl Godwin, was raised from comparative obscurity by King Cnut and given the Earldom of Wessex c. 1018–1019. He retained his position during the reigns of Cnut's sons Harold Harefoot and Harthacnut, and consolidated it when King Edward the Confessor conferred earldoms on Sweyn and Harold, Godwin's two eldest sons by his Danish wife Gytha.

The family survived a short-lived exile in Flanders 1051–1052. After Godwin's death in 1053, his sons held the earldoms of Wessex, East Anglia, and later Northumbria; Harold, in particular, became the most powerful man in England, eclipsing the power of the king. When Edward the Confessor died childless in 1066, he was succeeded by Harold Godwinson.

Harold gained a great victory over the Norwegian king Harald Hardrada and his own estranged brother Tostig Godwinson at the Battle of Stamford Bridge. Three weeks later, with his defeat and death at the Battle of Hastings, Anglo-Saxon self-rule came to an end. Later generations of the family were scattered around Northern Europe. Through female lines, the Godwin family are ancestors of royal houses across Europe, including the Grand Princes of Kiev and the modern British royal family.

Patrilineally, agnates of the House of Godwin have lived in Norway since 1067, where they belonged to the kingdom's greatest aristocratic dynasties. King Olaf III of Norway installed Skule Kongsfostre, a son of Earl Tostig, at the Rein estate in Trøndelag (Central Norway), establishing the Rein dynasty. Among his descendants were King Inge II of Norway, Duke Skule Bårdsson, and Queen Margaret Skulesdottir.

Earl Tostig's younger son, Ketil Hook, was given the Torgar estate in Hålogaland (Northern Norway) and married a granddaughter of chieftain Hárek of Tjøtta, establishing the younger Torgar dynasty. Finally, King Harold Godwinson's son Harold Haroldson joined the retinue of King Magnus III of Norway; his descendants may have been the many Godwins who appear in Eastern Norway from the early 13th century.

As earls, that is, quasi-sovereign princes, the family maintained its own hirð (pre-nobility retinue), including housecarls. In contemporary sources, including Vita Ædwardi Regis, the Godwins are described as dux (duke) and princeps (prince). The earls under King Edward the Confessor 'enjoyed viceregal powers' in their respective jurisdictions, according to Ian W. Walker (1997). Modern historians have characterised Godwin and his family as among the most famous in English history (David Bates) and one of the greatest noble houses in England in the first half of the 11th century (Frank Barlow).

== Origins ==
Godwin, Earl of Wessex, after whom the family is named, was the son of one Wulfnoth, probably to be identified with Wulfnoth Cild, a Sussex thegn who in 1009, having been accused of unspecified crimes, deserted the service of the English king Æthelred the Unready along with a fleet of twenty ships. Wulfnoth Cild may also have been father of Ælfwig, abbot of New Minster, who died at the battle of Hastings, and of a daughter called Æthelflaed; he is known to have died by 1014. The writer Alfred Anscombe claimed a lineage for this Wulfnoth stretching back through Æthelmær the Stout and the chronicler Æthelweard to king Æthelred I of Wessex, which would make the house of Godwin a branch of the house of Cerdic; but most historians are skeptical of this theory and treat Wulfnoth's ancestry as unknown.

== Godwin under the Danish kings ==
The date of Godwin's birth is estimated to have been around the year 993. He first appears in history as an adherent of Æthelstan Ætheling, the eldest son of Æthelred the Unready, and when that prince died in 1014 he left Godwin an estate. Godwin is surmised to have then given his allegiance to Athelstan's brother Edmund Ironside during the short remainder of Æthelred's life and Edmund's own brief reign, and to have supported him in his campaigns against the invading Danish king Cnut. With Edmund's death in 1016 and Cnut's acquisition of the English crown Godwin seems to have made his peace with the new king. He survived Cnut's purge of English nobles, and indeed prospered, being made earl first of the eastern part of Wessex and then, perhaps in 1020, of the whole province. He also about 1022 married Gytha, sister of the Danish earl Ulf, who was himself Cnut's brother-in-law. He was, by 1023, considered the leading magnate in Cnut's English kingdom, loyally supporting Cnut and implicitly trusted by him. When Cnut died in 1035 the succession was disputed between Cnut's two sons Harthacnut and Harold Harefoot; Godwin was one of Harthacnut's most influential supporters, but Harold ultimately prevailed. In 1036 another of Æthelred's sons, Alfred, made an expedition to England, where he fell into the hands first of Godwin and then of Harold Harefoot, who had him blinded. Alfred did not survive this operation, but it is unclear whether this was a deliberate execution on Harold's part, and still more unclear how much responsibility, if any, attaches to Godwin. Nevertheless, a cloud of suspicion hung over him for the rest of his life, and when, in 1040, Harold died, the new king, Harthacnut, exacted an oath from Godwin that he had been innocent of everything except obeying Harold's orders.

== Godwin's rivalry with Edward the Confessor ==
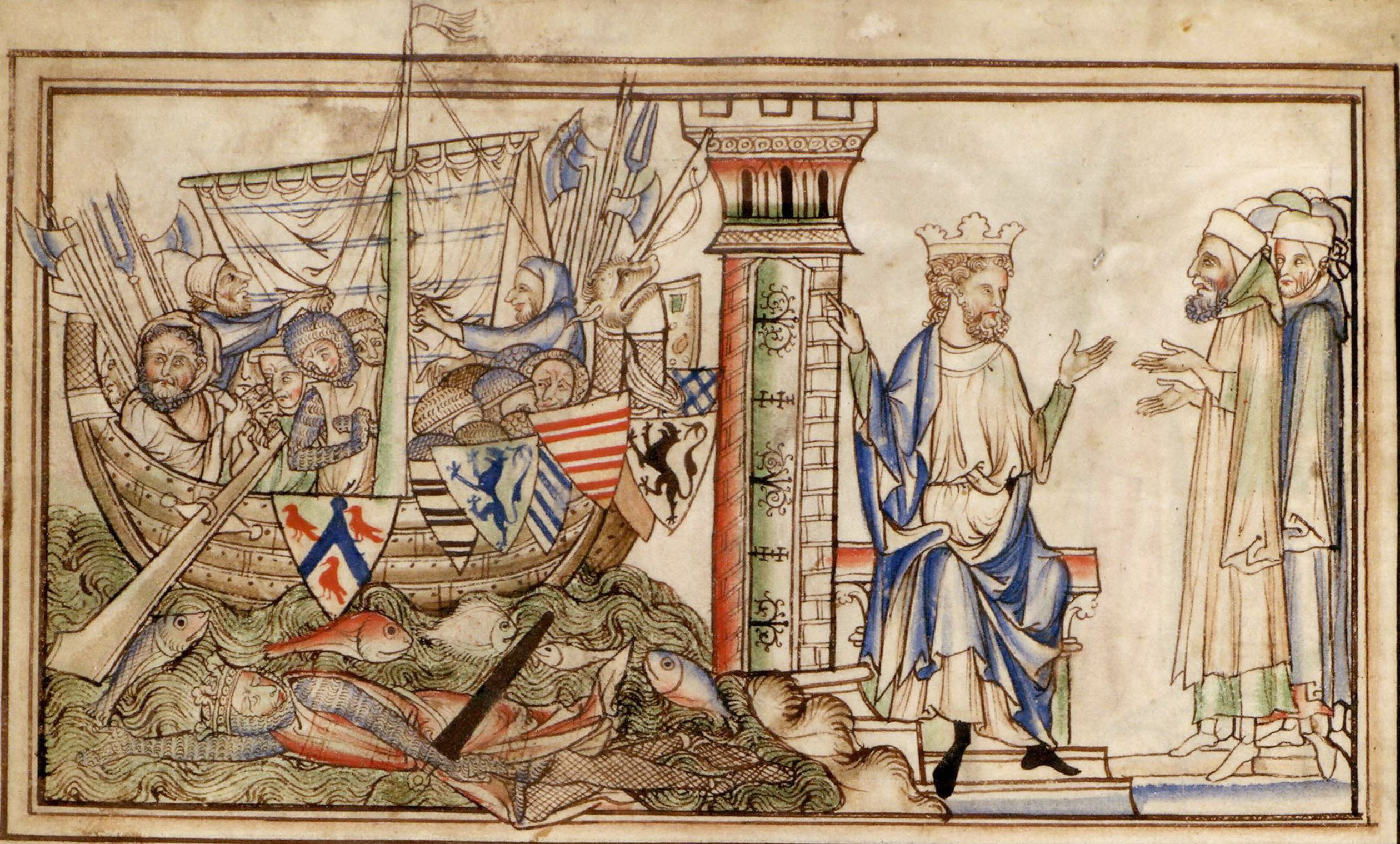
Godwin and his family return by ship to the court of king Edward the Confessor in 1052. From a 13th-century manuscript of the Vita Ædwardi Regis

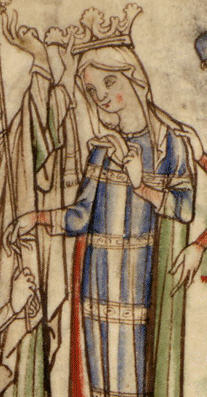
Portrait of Godwin's daughter Edith, from a 13th-century manuscript of the Vita Ædwardi Regis

In 1042 Harthacnut died, and was succeeded, with Godwin's hefty support, by Edward the Confessor, brother of the unfortunate Alfred. Godwin by now had a large family, six sons and three daughters, and the elder sons were becoming old enough to take on responsibilities of their own, while Edward needed to reward the man who had, more than any other, secured him the crown. Sweyn is usually accounted Godwin's eldest son, though the monk Hemming reported him as believing his real father had been Cnut; in 1043 he was given an earldom consisting of Somerset, Gloucestershire, Herefordshire, Oxfordshire and Berkshire. Godwin's second son, Harold, was made earl of East Anglia the following year. In 1045 Beorn Estrithson, Godwin's wife's nephew, was given an earldom in the east Midlands, and the same year the seal was set on the family's grasp of power when Godwin's eldest daughter, Edith, married king Edward. The Godwin family now held four English earldoms, only Mercia and Northumbria remaining in other hands, and had their representative even in the king's bedchamber. By contrast, Edward's personal estate, though very large, was probably smaller than that held by his ancestors, and was scattered between various earldoms, meaning that he had no local power base; moreover he had only recently returned to England as a half-Norman stranger with no experience of English politics or of any kind of leadership. A struggle for power between king and earl now began.

The first setback for the Godwin family stemmed from Sweyn's wild and irresponsible conduct. He first allied himself with Gruffydd ap Llywelyn, king of Gwynedd and Powys, who might be considered a natural enemy of the English, and launched with him a joint expedition into south Wales. On his return he either seduced or abducted the abbess of Leominster and kept her as his wife for a year, a scandal which resulted in his being outlawed by the king. Sweyn's lands were divided between his brother Harold and cousin Beorn, while he himself moved on first to Flanders and then to Denmark. Two years later, in 1049, he returned intending to regain his lands, but instead murdered Beorn. He was again outlawed and returned to Flanders, but the king allowed him to return in 1050. Despite his leniency in this matter, Edward was beginning to move against the Godwin family. He gave the murdered Beorn's earldom to his own nephew Ralph the Timid rather than to anyone allied to Godwin; he countermanded the election to the archbishopric of Canterbury of Godwin's kinsman Ælric, substituting instead Robert of Jumièges, an enemy of the Godwin clan; and he allowed a small number of castles to be built, or at least planned, by various of his foreign favourites in the earldoms held by Godwin and his sons.

Matters came to a head in 1051 when the men of Eustace, Count of Boulogne, who was passing through Dover, got involved in a fight with the townspeople. King Edward decided that Dover should be harried as a punishment, and ordered Godwin, within whose earldom Dover lay, to carry out the sentence. Godwin refused, and prepared for the king's displeasure. He and his sons gathered an army, the earls of Mercia and Northumbria assembled their men in defence of the king, and the result was a stalemate in which neither side wanted to attack the other. It was agreed that a meeting of the witan would resolve the dispute, but when the king called up the English militia Godwin's side found themselves outnumbered there. The result was that the whole family was banished. Godwin, his wife, and their sons Sweyn, Tostig and Gyrth fled to Bruges in Flanders, and Harold and his brother Leofwine to Ireland, while their sister queen Edith was sent to a nunnery.

The following year, 1052, Godwin and Harold both launched small fleets, joined up off the south-west coast of England, then recruited support from the ports of Sussex and Kent. This combined and augmented fleet sailed to London, where Godwin forced a new settlement of his differences with the king, entirely in his own favour. His and his family's earldoms were restored to them, the queen was recalled, and most of the king's numerous French favourites were outlawed. So firmly had the family regained its grip on power that Edward never again tried his strength against them. But Godwin did not enjoy his triumph long. In 1053, while celebrating Easter at Winchester along with some of his sons and the king, he suddenly collapsed and after a few days died. In the following century chroniclers embroidered the story with details suggesting that this was divine retribution; in the fullest form of the legend he takes a mouthful of bread, praying that he may not be allowed to swallow it if he was guilty of murdering the king's brother Alfred, then chokes and dies.

== Godwin's sons ==
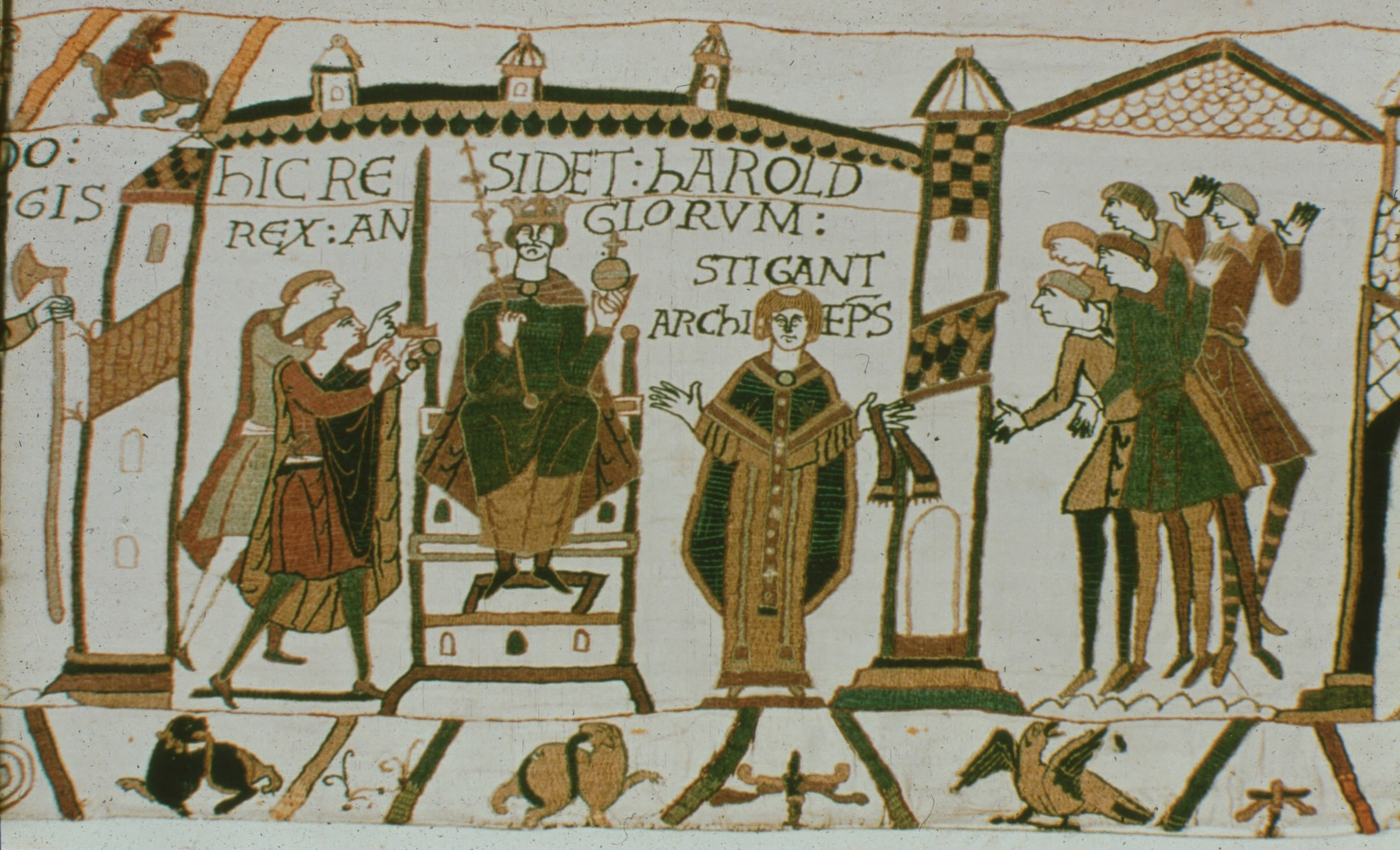
The coronation of Harold Godwinson, from the Bayeux Tapestry

Godwin's second son, Harold, succeeded him in the earldom of Wessex, while Harold's old earldom of East Anglia was taken by Ælfgar, son of the earl of Mercia. Godwin's eldest son, Sweyn, could not be considered for any title since he had gone on pilgrimage to Jerusalem, and indeed was to die in September 1052 on the return journey. Over the next few years one earldom after another fell vacant and was granted to Harold's various younger brothers. First Siward, Earl of Northumbria, died in 1055 and was succeeded by Tostig. Then in 1057 the earl of Mercia died and was succeeded by his son Ælfgar, freeing up East Anglia; a reduced form of this earldom was bestowed on Gyrth, while the counties of Essex, Hertfordshire, Buckinghamshire, Middlesex, Surrey and Kent were formed into a new earldom for Leofwine. The same year king Edward's nephew Ralph the Timid died, and his earldom of Hereford was added to Harold's Wessex. The Godwin family thus held the whole of England apart from Mercia under the kingship of Edward the Confessor, who was by now largely content to leave effective rule to his earls.

In 1063 Harold launched a cavalry raid intended to kill Gruffydd ap Llewelyn, who since 1055 had been ruling the whole of Wales, but it failed in its objective. He returned to the attack the same year along with his brother Tostig in a joint invasion of Wales, using both land and naval forces, which wreaked such destruction that Gruffydd's own men killed him and sent his head to Harold.

Not long afterwards, probably in 1064, Harold is thought to have set out on a voyage in the English Channel and been blown by a storm onto the coast of Ponthieu, whose count delivered him into the hands of William the Bastard, Duke of Normandy. It is not known what the purpose of Harold's journey was. Norman writers later alleged that he had been sent by king Edward to confirm William as heir to the English throne and to swear fealty to him, but his biographer Ian W. Walker considers the most likely possibilities to be, firstly, that he was seeking a marriage alliance between his family and William's; secondly, that he wanted to negotiate the release of his youngest brother Wulfnoth and Sweyn's son Hakon, who had long been held hostage in Normandy; and thirdly, that he was bound elsewhere for reasons unknown. Harold accompanied William on a campaign against Brittany, and then was coerced into swearing an oath that he would support William's claim to be Edward's heir. Finally, he was allowed to return home.

Tostig's record as earl of Northumbria was a mixed one. In external affairs he was rather successful, forming a friendship with the king of Scotland which largely prevented trouble on his northern border, and leading a legation to Rome on Edward's behalf. But inside his earldom his over-harsh measures to keep the king's peace made him unpopular with his own nobles. In 1065, while Tostig was at king Edward's court in the south of England, they revolted against him, murdered his men, and demanded his banishment. Harold, unwilling to provoke a civil war, refused to invade Northumbria to reinstate him, and king Edward reluctantly acceded to the rebels' demands and exiled Tostig. Furious at his brother's failure to support him, Tostig left for Flanders, and there is evidence that he visited William of Normandy, king Sweyn II of Denmark, and king Harald Hardrada of Norway, in an attempt to find allies who could return him to power. The earldom of Northumbria was given to Morcar, brother of the Mercian earl Edwin, and Harold allied himself to the brothers by marrying their sister Ealdgyth. At the beginning of 1066 Edward the Confessor died childless, after having apparently named Harold as his heir. The witan, preferring the claims of Harold to those of the late king's great-nephew, the boy Edgar Ætheling, elected him as king, and he was crowned the day after Edward's death. His reign was to last just nine months, and, as the Anglo-Saxon Chronicle says, "he met little quiet in it as long as he ruled the realm".

== Harold II ==
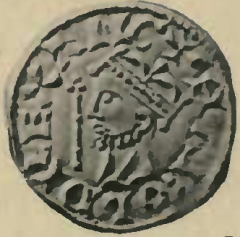
A penny of king Harold Godwinson

Harold faced threats from the duke of Normandy, from the king of Norway, and from possible Welsh raiders, but the first to act was his own brother Tostig, who in the spring of 1066 launched raids on the Isle of Wight and various points on the east coast of England before suffering a severe defeat in Lincolnshire and taking refuge in Scotland. Harold, expecting an invasion by William of Normandy, moved to the south coast to prepare his defences, but on 8 September, unable to provision his forces any longer, he was compelled to disband them. The same month, Harald Hardrada set out from Norway on his attempt to take the English crown, sailing via Shetland and Orkney and joining up with Tostig at the river Tyne, where the latter took service under him as one of his earls. Together they engaged a Northumbrian army at Fulford in Yorkshire, gained a complete victory, and took the city of York. Harold Godwinson hurriedly recalled his army and by forced marches was able to surprise Harald and Tostig's army at Stamford Bridge on 25 September, only five days after the battle of Fulford, and inflicted a crushing defeat on them. He allowed the few survivors, including Tostig's sons Skule and Ketel, to return in peace to Norway. Three days later duke William landed his invasion fleet at Pevensey in Sussex, then moved on to Hastings and began to ravage the Sussex countryside, part of Harold's old earldom of Wessex. This achieved its intended effect of provoking Harold to march south with all speed. On 14 October the two armies met seven miles north of Hastings, where the town of Battle now stands. Harold, accompanied by his brothers Gyrth and Leofwine, commanded an army that was now badly overtired and proved unable to withstand the repeated Norman attacks. By the end of the day Harold's army was comprehensively defeated, all three brothers were dead, and the ruin of Anglo-Saxon England was accomplished.

== The family disperses ==
Only two members of the family were allowed to live undisturbed in England under Norman rule. Edward the Confessor's widow Edith, daughter of Godwin, lived in retirement, remaining in possession of all her private lands, until her death in 1075. She was buried near her husband in Westminster Abbey. Her niece Gunhild, daughter of Harold Godwinson, was an inmate of the nunnery in Wilton until 1093, when she was abducted by Alan the Red, a Breton who held the lordship of Richmond. She lived with him, and then with his successor Alan the Black, after which she disappears from history.

Godwin's youngest son, Wulfnoth (b. c. 1036), was kept as a hostage in Normandy from 1051 until William the Conqueror's death in 1087, and was then transferred to Winchester by William Rufus, where he may have become a monk. He is thought to have died about 1094.

In the aftermath of the battle of Hastings Godwin's widow, Gytha, by then in her sixties, withdrew to the south-west of England, where she held vast estates and where resistance to the Conquest was mounting. William the Conqueror turned his attention to crushing this resistance at the beginning of 1068, and laid siege to the city of Exeter, but Gytha had already fled, probably with her daughter Gunhild and Harold's daughter Gytha, and taken refuge first on Flat Holm or Steep Holm in the Bristol Channel, and then at Saint-Omer in Flanders. Harold's young sons Godwin and Edmund, and possibly also their brother Magnus, may have been at the siege of Exeter; certainly they made their way to the court of king Diarmait of Leinster in Ireland, from where they launched two unsuccessful raids against south-west England. Two of the sons, probably Godwin and Edmund, survived to join their relatives in Saint-Omer. From there the whole party seems to have proceeded to Denmark in the hope that its king, Sweyn II, would help them regain their position in England. Sweyn failed them in this, but after a few years he arranged an advantageous marriage for the younger Gytha with Vladimir Monomakh, Prince of Smolensk and later Grand Prince of Kiev. Their descendants intermarried with royal houses across Europe, and transmitted the blood of the Godwins to, among many others, the present monarchs of the United Kingdom and Denmark.

Ulf, a younger son of Harold Godwinson, was captured at some point by William the Conqueror, and was held prisoner in Normandy. At the death of William the Conqueror his son Robert Curthose released and knighted Ulf, but no more is known of his life.

Harold, the youngest and probably posthumous son of Harold Godwinson, was taken by his mother to Dublin, and later went to Norway, where he was welcomed by the king. In 1098 he was one of the men Magnus III Barelegs took with him on an expedition to Orkney, the Hebrides, the Isle of Man and Anglesey. No further mention of Harold appears in any source.

== Cadet branches ==
Patrilineally, the House of Godwin was continued through at least three known cadet branches in Norway, namely, the House of Gudine, the House of Rein, and the House of Torgar. In the summer of 1067, following the Battle of Stamford Bridge on 25 September 1066, Ketil Hook (Norwegian: Kjetil Krok) and his half-brother Skúli Kongsfostre immigrated to Norway under King Olaf III of Norway. Ketil was the son of Tostig Godwinson, Earl of Northumbria from 1055 to 1065, and thus a grandson of Godwin, Earl of Wessex and Kent.

=== House of Gudine ===
Prince Harold Haroldson, son of King Harold II of England, became a member of the retinue of King Magnus III of Norway. Harold, then aged c. 33 years, is mentioned for the last time in 1098. Harold may have had wife and children in Norway before or after that. His descendants may be the many men named Godwin who appear in historical sources from the 13th century onwards across Eastern Norway, including Gudine Geig, a hirdmann of Duke Skule mentioned in Hákonar saga Hákonarsonar.

=== House of Rein ===
House of Rein
- Noble and royal house
- Parent family: House of Godwin
- Origin: Trøndelag, Norway
- Founder: Skúli Kongsfostre
- Final ruler: Inge II (1217)
- Titles: List: King of Norway; Lendmann; Earl; Duke
- Cadet branches: House of Sverre (cognatic)

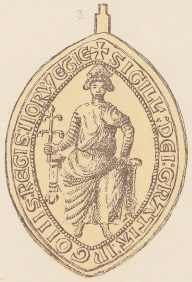
Seal of King Inge II of Norway

A son of the Earl of Northumbria, Skúli Kongsfostre came to Norway in 1067 together with his brother Ketil Hook. Most likely, their mother was among the descendants of Ketil Trout the Older in Namdalen in Trøndelag.

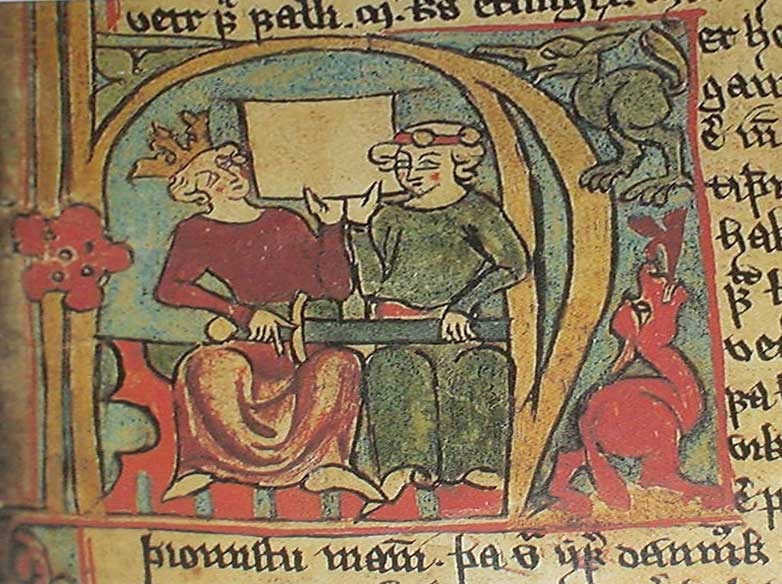
Haakon IV and Skule Bårdsson, from the 14th-century manuscript Flateyjarbók

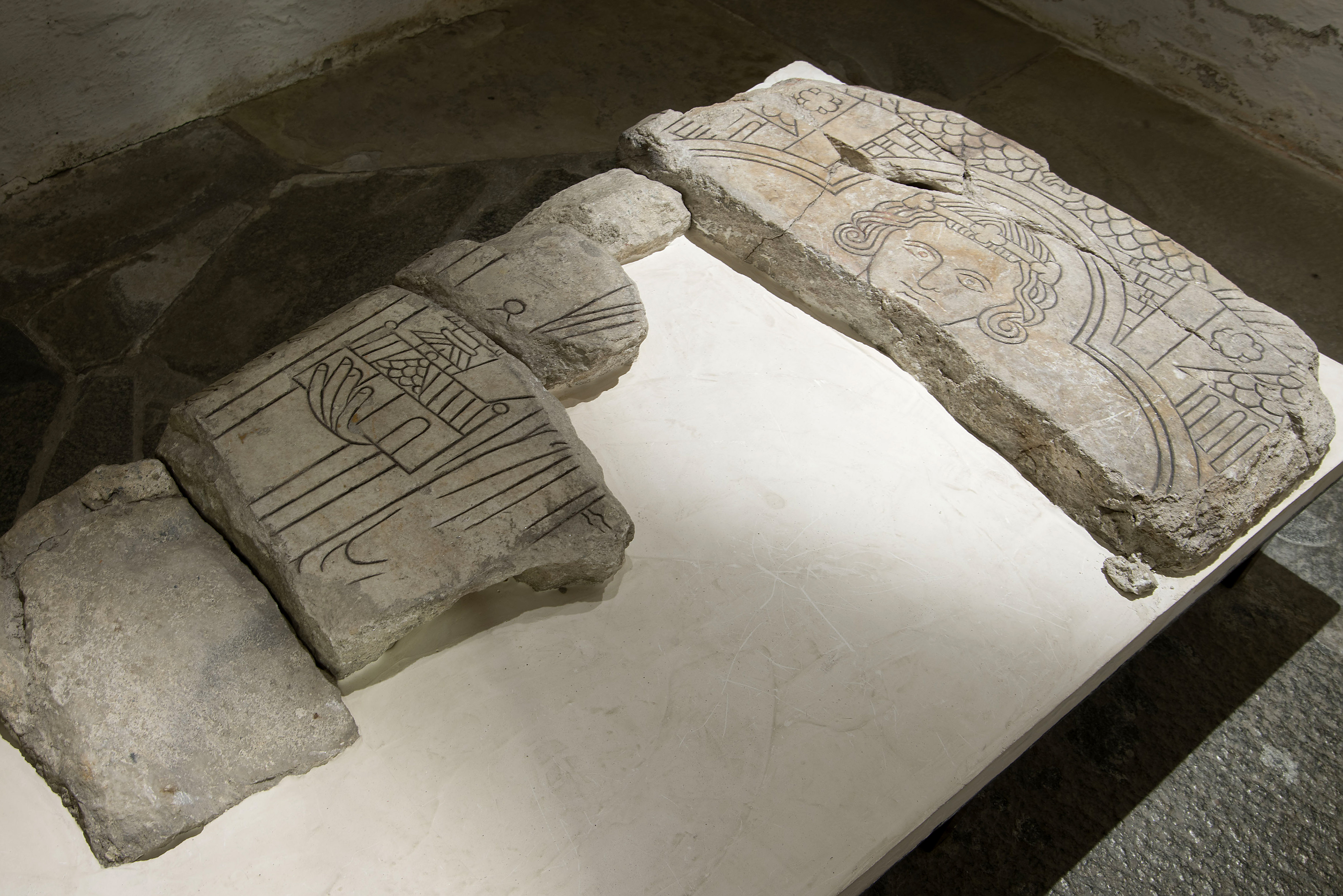
The remains of Duke Skule of Rein's gravestone

A favourite of King Olaf III of Norway, Skúli was installed at the Rein estate in Trøndelag (in the present-day Indre Fosen Municipality in Central Norway). Remembered as a remarkably intelligent and handsome man who commanded the king's hird, Skúli married a relative of the king, Gudrun Nevsteinsdotter. Their son was Ásúlfr of Rein, father of lendman Guttorm of Rein. Guttorm's son, Bård Guttormsson of Rein, was a close friend and supporter of King Sverre Sigurdsson, fought alongside him in several battles, and was rewarded by being given the king's half-sister Cecilia Sigurdsdotter in marriage. Bård and Cecilia's son Inge Bårdsson was born c. 1185.

In 1204, when the child-king Guttorm Sigurdsson died, the two obvious candidates for the crown were Inge and his half-brother Haakon the Crazy, Cecilia's son by another husband. After a struggle for power, Inge was recognized as king, while Haakon retained his former command of the army. This did not produce peace: a faction known as the Baglers succeeded in splitting the kingdom, with Inge ruling the western half and their own candidate, Philip Simonsson, the eastern half. Moreover, Earl Haakon renewed his own claim to the crown, a claim which only lapsed with his death in 1214. King Inge himself died in 1217.

Since 1213 the leader of the army and the hird had been Inge's half-brother Skúli, a son of Bård Guttormsson by another wife, Ragnfrid Erlingsdotter, and therefore, alike King Inge, a fifth-generation male-line descendant of Tostig Godwinson. The new king, Haakon IV, was still a minor, with Skúli acting as his regent. In 1225, Skúli married his young daughter Margrete off to King Haakon VII, but this did not succeed in establishing perfect amity between the two. In 1239, Skúli went into open rebellion, claiming the title of king for himself. The subsequent war went against him, and he was killed in 1240. From Haakon IV and Margrete Skulesdotter descend subsequent kings of Norway down to the present day through the House of Sverre.

=== House of Torgar ===
House of Torgar
- Noble house
- Parent family: House of Godwin
- Origin: England
- Founder: Ketil Hook
- Titles: List: Lendman; Hirdman; Skutilsvein; Knight; Baron

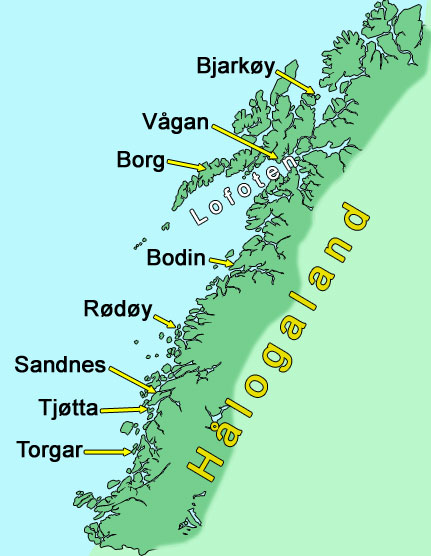
The most important aristocratic estates in early medieval Hålogaland, with Torgar being the southernmost

Extensively described in Egil's Saga, the older House of Torgar begins with Bjǫrgúlfr, the father of Brynjúlfr, semi-sovereign chieftains who also had the privilege to tax the Sámi (cf. King of the Sámi) on behalf of the King of Norway. Brynjúlfr's son Bárðr Brynjúlfsson was killed in the Battle of Hafrsfjord, traditionally dated to 872 AD.

Before the battle, Bárðr had bequeathed his wife Sigrid of Sandnes and the Torgar estate to his friend Þórúlfr Kveldúlfsson, a son of Kveldúlfr Bjálfason and Salbjǫrg Káradóttir of Berle, likewise a brother of Skalla-Grímr. He settled at Torgar, and with the king's consent, the hereditary privilege to tax the Sámi was transferred to him.

After some time, however, Þórúlfr fell from grace with King Harald I of Norway, who first expelled him from Torgar and confiscated the estate, and whose men eventually killed him at his wife's ancestral seat of Sandnes. With him, the older House of Torgar disappears from the historical sources; the destiny of his son, who is mentioned by the sagas, is unknown. Sigrid then married Eyvindr Lambi Kárason of Berle, who founded the House of Tjøtta, and among whose descendants we find Hárekr of Tjøtta.

In the summer of 1067, following the Battle of Stamford Bridge on 25 September 1066, Ketil Hook (Norwegian: Kjetil Krok) and his half-brother Skúli Kongsfostre immigrated to Norway under King Olaf III of Norway. Ketil was the son of Tostig Godwinson, Earl of Northumbria from 1055 to 1065, and thus a grandson of Godwin, Earl of Wessex and Kent.

King Olaf III installed Skúli on the Rein estate in Trøndelag, that is, Central Norway. Skúli's descendants were to be known as the House of Rein (Norwegian: Reinsætten). Ketil, on his hand, was given the Torgar estate, and married a granddaughter of Hárekr of Tjøtta, thus establishing the younger House of Torgar. According to the 13th-century saga-writer Snorri Sturluson, 'from him are descended many great people.' The Torgar line of the House of Godwin would produce several lendmenn, that is, regional governors, serving under successive kings from 1069 until the early 14th century.

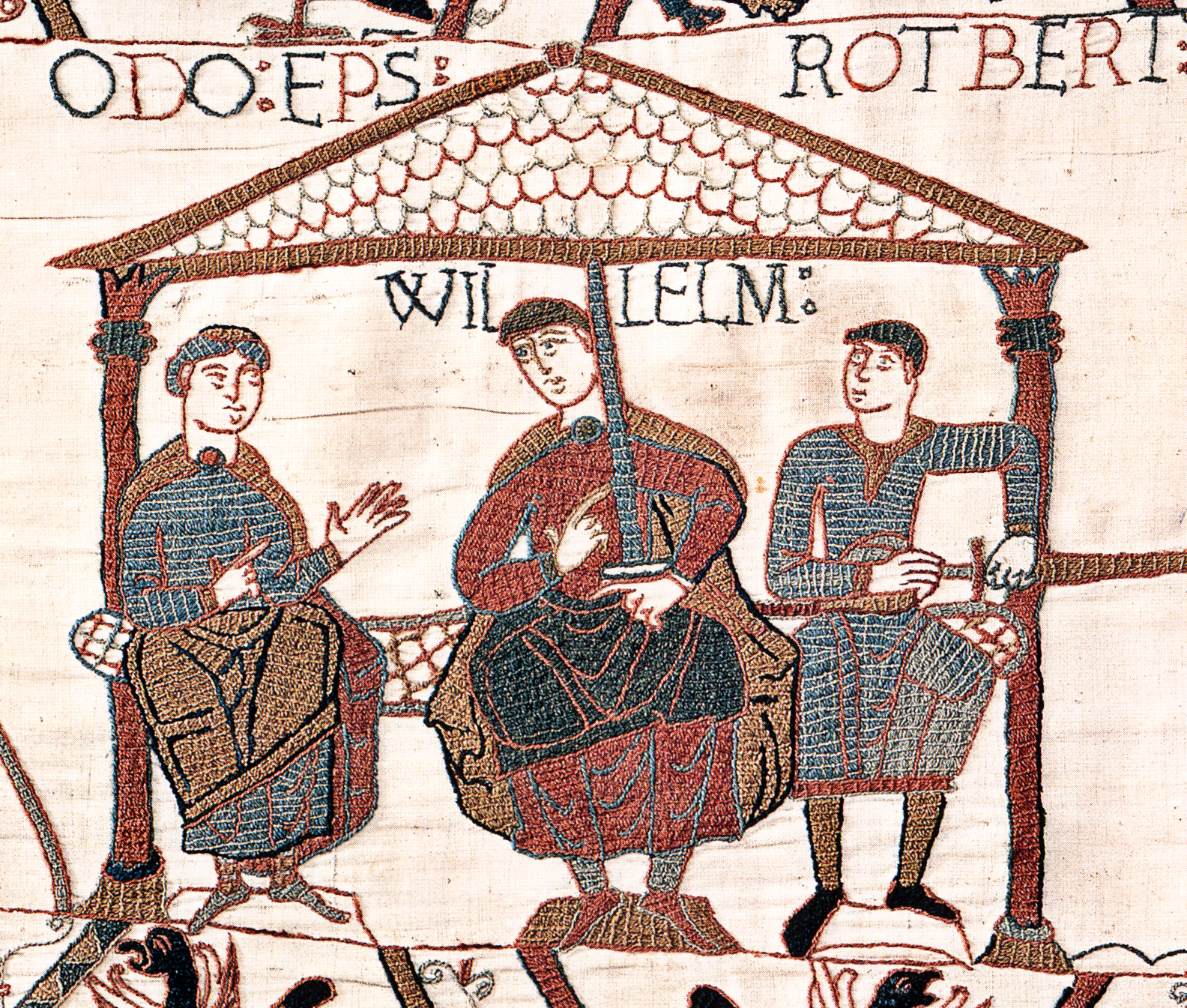
The younger House of Torgar is also known as the House of William, ultimately named in honour of William the Conqueror, here depicted on the Bayeux Tapestry.

The younger House of Torgar is also known as the House of William (Norwegian: Viljalmsætten). Ketil's son William (Norwegian: Viljalm) was allegedly named in honour of William the Conqueror, who—in addition to being a distant relative of Ketil—had killed the killer of Ketil's own father. A second cousin of King Canute IV of Denmark, Ketil ordered the construction of Saint Canute's Church, just north of Brønnøysund in the late 11th or early 12th century, the ruins of which still stand at Tilrem.

Lendman Ketil's son was William I of Torgar, lendman under King Harald IV and his sons. He was killed in c. 1139 by Sigurd Slembe. His grandson William II of Torgar, military commander (sveithøvding) under King Magnus V, was killed in the Battle of Fimreite in 1184, according to Sverris Saga.

William II's grandson William III of Torgar may have been a skutilsvein or a regular hirdman, and eventually became a lendman, under King Haakon IV. In c. 1222, William III was the tenth of twelve witnesses when Haakon IV issued minting rights to the Archbishop of Nidaros (cf. Regesta Norvegica, vol. I, no. 452). In 1239, William III joined Duke Skule Bårdsson of Rein as a military commander in the latter's unsuccessful riot against Haakon IV. He is mentioned several places in Hákonar saga Hákonarsonar, which claims that in the 1239 Battle of Oslo, the wounded William III refused Ivar Dyre's offer to accept grið (mercy).

Ultimately, William III's grandson Lord William IV of Torgar, also known as William of Stiklestad, was a knight, a royal envoy to England and Scotland during the Scottish succession crisis, and finally a baron. His wife Lady Brynhild was a daughter of Olav Ragnridson of Steine, a granddaughter of Ragnrid Skulesdotter of Rein and Olav Ingason of Steine, and ultimately a great-granddaughter of queen mother Inga of Varteig. (Both ‘Ragnridson’ and ‘Ingason’ were matronyms. With their royal ancestry, Ragnrid and Inga outranked their husbands, stipulating a deviation from the common custom of patronyms.)

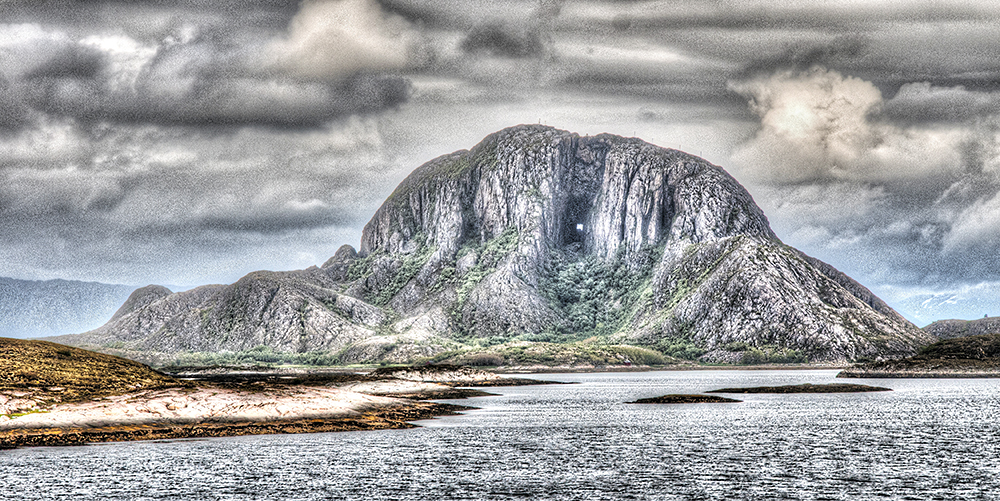
Torget, formerly spelled Torgar, in present-day Brønnøy Municipality, Nordland. The farm was the centre of an estate in Central and Northern Norway

Having been one of Norway's leading aristocratic dynasties for around 250 years, the House of Torgar's political influence started to decline in the early 14th century, as the Norwegian throne was inherited by foreign princes. In response, the House of Torgar increasingly affiliated with the Archbishop, gradually selling and donating the Torgar estate to the Archdiocese of Nidaros as well as the Benedictine Nidarholm Abbey in return for positions in the archbishopric administration.

This transaction is known as the Torgar deal (Norwegian: Torgarkjøpet, formerly Torga kaupit etc.). The details of an alleged agreement remain obscure for the aftertime, but according to Ragnhild Høgsæt of the University of Tromsø, it seems to have intended to create some sort of enfeoffment. Høgsæt (1986) writes: ‘It is possible that one of the conditions for the transference of Torgar to the Archbishop some time between 1404 and 1428, may have been an agreement that the former owners and their descendants were to keep the Torgar estate as a fief from the Archbishop.’

== Coats of arms ==
Although the Anglo-Saxons used representative symbols, often displayed on banners, heraldry had not emerged by then, and members of the House of Godwin are neither known nor likely to have borne coats of arms. In the Great Hall of Winchester Castle in Winchester, then-capital of England, as well as several armorials, some coats of arms have been attributed to members of the House.

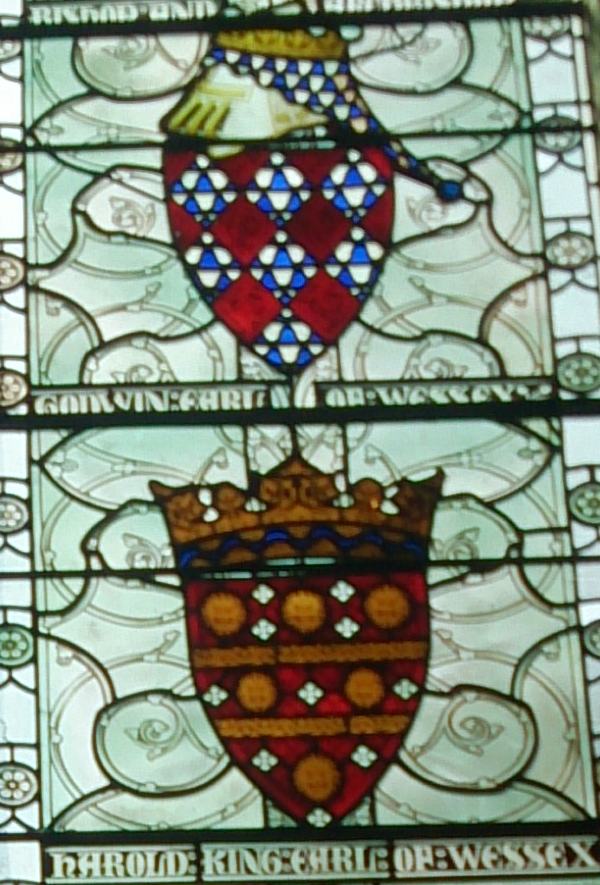
Attributed arms of Godwin, Earl of Wessex and Harold, King of England based on the Stained-glass in the Great Hall of Winchester Castle.

Arms attributed to King Harold II

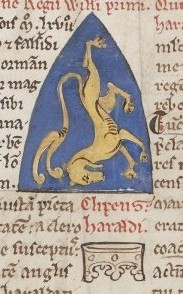
Arms attributed to King Harold II
(Matthew Paris, 13th century)

== Family tree ==
This family tree shows the generally accepted male-line descendants of Wulfnoth Cild, though some of the known male-line descendants of Guttorm of Rein have been excluded in the interests of clarity. Judith of Flanders was not the biological mother of Tostig's sons Skule and Ketil.

Wulfnoth; Cild
Godwin, Earl of Wessex	Gytha; Thorkelsdóttir
Sweyn; Godwinson, Earl of Somerset etc.	Edyth; Swannesha	Harold II, King of England	Ealdgyth of Mercia	Tostig; Godwinson, Earl of Northumbria	Judith of Flanders	Gyrth; Godwinson, Earl of East Anglia	Leofwine; Godwinson, Earl of Kent etc.	Wulfnoth; Godwinson	Edith of Wessex	Edward the Confessor, King of England
Godwin	Edmund	Magnus	Gunhild	Gytha	Vladimir; Monomakh, Grand Prince of Kiev	Ulf	Harold	Skule; Kongsfostre	Gudrun; Nevsteinsdotter	Ketel; Krok
Tora; Skoptesdotter	Åsolv of Rein	Ragnhild	Orm; Kyrping
Sigrid; Thorkelsdotter	Guttorm of Rein	Sigrid	Halkel; Huk
Cecilia; Sigurdsdotter	Bård; Guttormsson	Ragnfrid; Erlingsdotter
Gyrid	Inge II, King of Norway	Skule; Bårdsson (Duke Skule)	Ragnhild
Guttorm	Margrete; Skulesdotter	Haakon IV, King of Norway
House of Sverre

== See also ==
- Royal descent
- Royal family

== Footnotes ==
Royal house House of Godwin
Preceded by House of Wessex	Ruling house of England; 1066	Succeeded by House of Normandy
