= Ealdgyth of Mercia =

11th-century Queen of Wales and England

Ealdgyth

Queen consort of the English
- Tenure: January 1066 – 14 October 1066

Queen consort of Wales
- Tenure: c. 1057 – c. 1063
- Spouse: Gruffudd ap Llywelyn; Harold Godwinson
- Issue: Maredudd ap Gruffydd; Idwal ap Gruffydd; Nest ferch Gruffydd; Harold
- Father: Ælfgar, Earl of Mercia
- Mother: Ælfgifu

Ealdgyth (fl. c.1057–1066), also Aldgyth or Edith in modern English, was a daughter of Ælfgar, Earl of Mercia, the wife of Gruffudd ap Llywelyn (d. 1063), ruler of all Wales, and later the wife and queen consort of Harold Godwinson, king of England in 1066. She was described by William of Jumièges as a considerable beauty.

== Family ==
Ealdgyth was the daughter of Ælfgar, who had been earl of East Anglia a number of times in the 1050s and was appointed earl of Mercia in c. 1057, in succession of his father Earl Leofric. Ælfgar's wife Ælfgifu was probably her mother, and Eadwine, the later earl of Mercia, and Morcar, earl of Northumbria, were her brothers.

In 1055, Ælfgar was exiled on the charge of treason. He went to Ireland to muster troops and formed an alliance with Gruffudd ap Llywelyn, who had been king of Gwynedd (1039–1055) but assumed the sovereignty of all Wales in 1055. Ælfgar and Gruffudd invaded England and plundered Hereford, bringing great humiliation to Earl Ralph, who needed to call in external support to repel the invaders. When peace was made, Ælfgar resumed office before succeeding his father as earl of Mercia in c. 1057.

== Marriages and issue ==
=== Gruffudd ap Llywelyn ===
It was presumably in the year of her father's appointment (c. 1057) that Ealdgyth married his political ally, King Gruffudd ap Llywelyn. William of Jumièges describes her as a woman of considerable beauty. Walter Map also wrote of a beautiful lady much beloved by the king and so he may have had Ealdgyth in mind. On her marriage, she was given a modest amount of land in England, though the only estate which can be certainly identified as having belonged to her is one at Binley, Warwickshire. She bore the king a daughter called Nest. Nest later became the wife of Osbern fitzRichard, a marcher lord on the Herefordshire border, who acquired Binley. Nest and Osbern had a daughter who married Bernard de Neufmarché, also a marcher lord. The chronicles also record two of Gruffudd's sons, Maredudd and Ithel, probably for Idwal, who died in 1069, and a third son may be Owain ap Gruffudd (d. 1059).

The alliance between Ealdgyth's father and husband was of great significance in resisting the growing power of the Godwinesons. On the death of Earl Ralph in 1057, Hereford was added to Harold's earldom. The following year, Ælfgar was outlawed for a second time, but he was restored to office before long. Ælfgar is last heard of in 1062 and seems to have died by 1063, when Harold Godwineson invaded Wales. Gruffudd was killed in the event.

=== Harold Godwinson ===
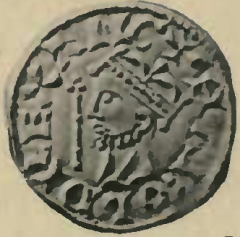
Silver penny depicting King Harold II of England, the second husband of Edith of Mercia

Ealdgyth later became the wife and queen consort of her late husband's enemy Harold. The date of the marriage is unknown, but it must have taken place at some stage before the Conquest, whether before or after Harold's coronation as king of England (January 1066). It seems that Harold's choice of bride was "aimed not only at securing the support of the Mercian house for himself in his royal ambitions, but also at weakening the links between that same house and the rulers of north Wales". In any event, Ealdgyth was soon to be widowed for a second time. In October that year, Harold was defeated and died in the Battle of Hastings, which was fought against the invading forces of William, Duke of Normandy, who would subsequently ascend the English throne. At the news of Harold's death, Ealdgyth's brothers went to London to fetch her and immediately sent her to Chester for shelter. It is unknown what happened to her thereafter. Harold had a number of children with his common law wife Edith the Fair, but his marriage to Ealdgyth may not have produced any offspring. It has been suggested that Ealdgyth may have been the mother of Harold's son Harold, but this possibility is not universally accepted.

== Notes ==
English royalty
Preceded by Edith of Wessex	Queen consort of the English; 4 January – 14 October 1066	Vacant Title next held by Matilda of Flanders
