= Ælfwig (abbot of New Minster) =

Abbot of Newminster

Ælfwig (died 1066) was the abbot of New Minster, the uncle of Harold Godwinson, and was probably the brother of Godwin, Earl of Wessex. Ælfwig was made abbot in 1063. When Harold marched to meet the Normans in the Battle of Hastings, Ælfwig joined him with 12 of his monks, wearing coats of mail over their monastic garb, and 20 armed men. He and his monks fell fighting at Senlac Hill. After the battle their bodies were recognised by the habit of their order, which was seen beneath their armour. William the Conqueror punished the convent severely for the part which it had taken in resisting his invasion.
