= Siege of Exeter (1068) =

Part of the Norman Conquest of England

Coordinates: 50°43′33″N 3°31′47″W

- Part of the Norman Conquest
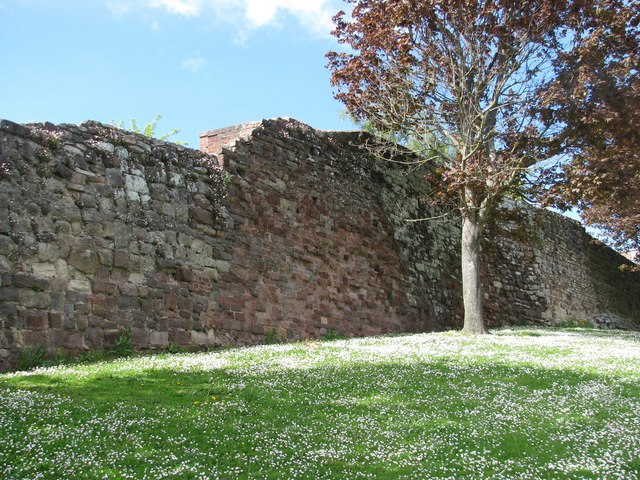
- Part of the Exeter's Roman city wall, repaired and defended by the English in 1068.
Date	Spring 1068
Location	Exeter
Result	Conditional surrender of the city

Belligerents
Exonian rebels and allies from other nearby cities	Royal forces

Commanders and leaders
Gytha Thorkelsdóttir	William I of England

Strength
Much of Exeter's population and allies from other local towns	Initially 500 Norman cavalry supported by English fyrd infantry

The siege of Exeter occurred early in 1068 when King William I of England marched a combined army of Normans and loyal Englishmen westwards to force the submission of the city of Exeter in Devon, a stronghold of Anglo-Saxon resistance against Norman rule following the Norman conquest of England. After a siege lasting eighteen days, the city surrendered to William under generous terms and allowed the Normans to consolidate their hold over the West Country.

== Background ==
Exeter originated as a Roman civitas called Isca Dumnoniorum, which was provided with town walls in about 200 AD. It later became an Anglo-Saxon burh or fortified settlement and the Roman walls were said to have been repaired and improved by King Æthelstan in the 10th century.

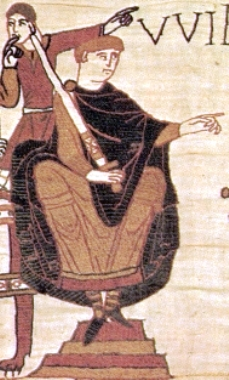
King William I depicted in the Bayeux Tapestry.

After the Battle of Hastings in October 1066, Duke William of Normandy marched on London and accepted the surrender of the leading English nobles at Berkhamsted and was subsequently crowned King of England at Westminster Abbey on Christmas Day. After the death of Harold Godwinson, his mother, Gytha Thorkelsdóttir, took refuge in Exeter, which then became the main focus in the West Country of resistance to Norman rule. Gytha had considerable wealth and hoped for the arrival of Harold's three sons, Godwin, Edmund and Magnus, who had gone to Ireland to raise an army. Orderic Vitalis states that she sent messages to other towns and cities in the region asking for support and was in contact her nephew, Sweyn II of Denmark.

In March 1067, William had returned to Normandy in triumph, but there news arrived of events in Exeter. According to Orderic, some Norman soldiers that William had sent across to England ended up in Exeter where they were badly treated; they were stated to have been blown off course by bad weather, but were possibly on a reconnaissance mission. This, together with evidence that Exeter was soliciting support for an uprising, caused William to issue a demand of fealty from the city. When the reply came from Exeter, it was made clear that the citizens not only declined to swear allegiance to William or to allow him to enter their city, but also refused to pay any taxes beyond those that were customary, probably in reference to the severe taxes imposed after the Conquest that are described in the Anglo-Saxon Chronicle. Orderic relates that William said that he would not accept subjects under those conditions and he returned to England in December 1067. Other threats to Norman rule at that time included the revolt of Edric the Wild in Herefordshire and a failed attack on Dover Castle, but the defiance of Exeter with the connected threats of the Danes and Harold's sons was the most pressing matter.

== William's march west ==
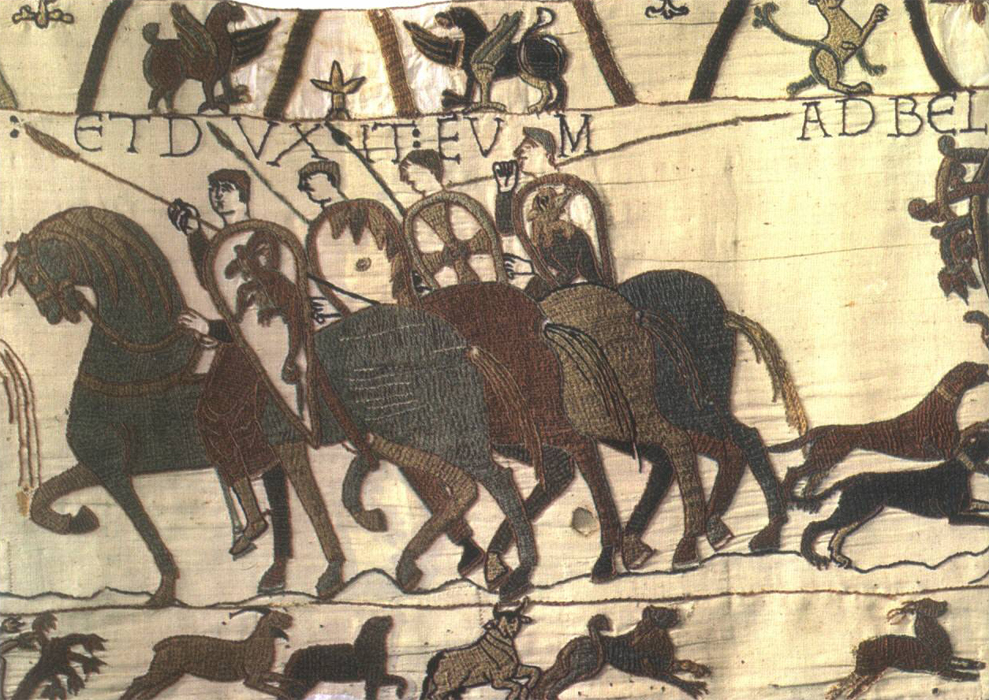
Norman cavalry depicted in the Bayeux Tapestry.

King William celebrated Christmas in London and then began his move towards Exeter. The fact that he took the unusual step of campaigning in the depths of winter is indicative of William's determination to deliver a pre-emptive strike against the Godwinsons. For the first time, William supplemented his Norman cavalry by calling out the fyrd, the traditional force of English militia infantry, which besides increasing the size of his force, would have been a test of loyalty for his new subjects. On William's march through Dorset, he took the opportunity to pillage the towns which he perceived were supporting Exeter; the damage inflicted at Dorchester, Shaftesbury and Bridport was still evident at the time of the Domesday survey some 18 years later.

== The siege ==
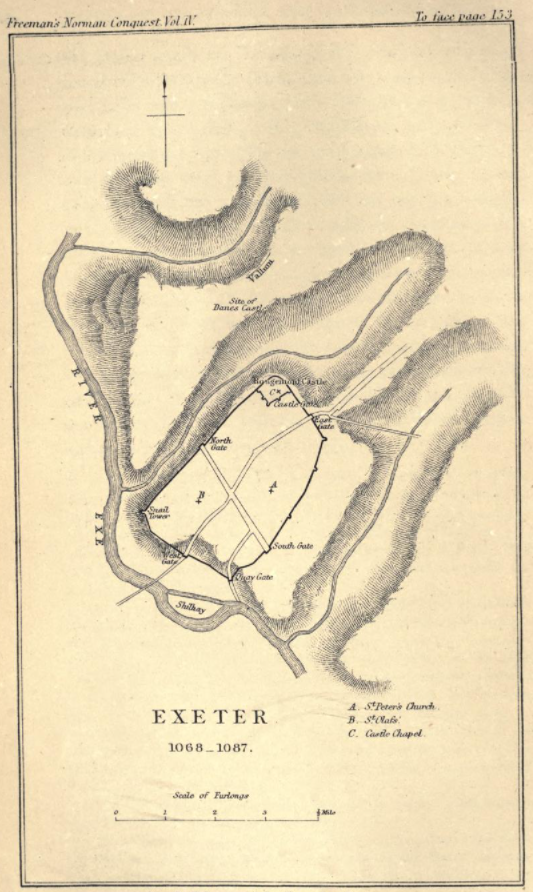
A 19th century depiction of Exeter's defences in the 11th century.

When William arrived in Exeter's environs, he made camp, probably at the village of Clyst Honiton. Here, William was met by a delegation of prominent Exeter citizens, who pledged their submission to William and handed over hostages as surety. There are two interpretations of this encounter; firstly that two parties had emerged in Exeter, one hoping for a peaceful settlement, and the other, led by Gytha, being determined to resist, while the second possibility was that this was a bluff by Gytha who was playing for time, hoping for the timely arrival of her grandsons with an Anglo-Irish army. Whatever the intention, when William and his army arrived at the East Gate of Exeter, he found it closed against him and the walls crowded with armed men. In response to this afront, he had one of the hostages blinded in full view of the city's defenders, although this did not diminish their resolve; according to William of Malmesbury, one of the men on the battlements responded by lowering his breeches and farting towards the Normans.

The various accounts of the details of the siege are divergent on some points and difficult to reconcile. According to the D Version of the Anglo-Saxon Chronicle attributed to John of Worcester, the siege lasted for eighteen days and William's army suffered large losses, presumably in direct assaults At some stage in the battle, Gytha escaped from city by boat along the River Exe, together with some of her supporters, indicating that William's army was not supported by ships. Orderic states that William eventually managed to breach the walls by mining, the first record of this technique being used in England. However, the siege ended by negotiation rather than conquest; according to Orderic, the gates were opened and the townspeople, preceded by their clergy carrying sacred books and relics, pleaded for clemency. All the sources agree that William's terms were generous, in return for the city's fealty, with the Chronicle adding that he agreed to their previous request to pay tax only at pre-Conquest levels. William also prevented his soldiers from claiming their traditional right of looting the surrendered city, posting reliable guards at the gates to ensure its safety.

== Aftermath ==
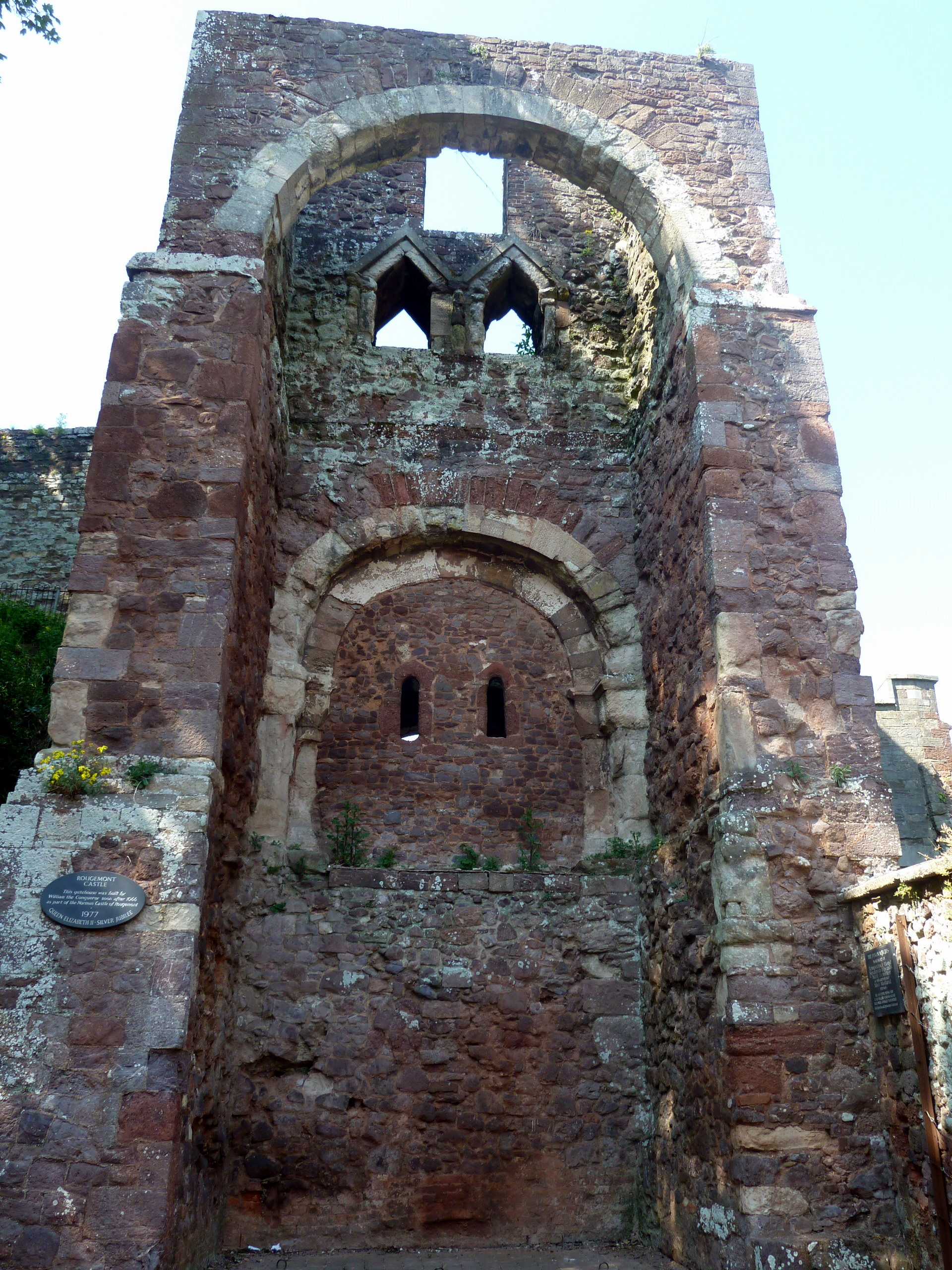
The surviving Norman gateway of Rougemont Castle, built shortly after the siege.

William ordered the construction of a stone castle to dominate Exeter and Rougemont Castle was built inside the northeast of the city wall. William's unusual generosity of terms at Exeter may have been due to the need to bring the West Country under his control. Antiquary William Hals speculated that Condor, the pre-Conquest Earl of Cornwall who had sworn fealty to William for his earldom, may have supported the rebels at Exeter, and was deprived of his earldom for this. In any case, William subsequently marched his army into Cornwall in a show of strength, before returning to Winchester to celebrate Easter. The garrison of Exeter was initially commanded by William de Vauville but soon passed to Baldwin FitzGilbert (or de Meulles), while Brian of Brittany was made earl of the West Country.

Gytha and her entourage sailed from the siege at Exeter to the Bristol Channel where she established a base on the island of Flat Holm, possibly in the hope of a rendez-vous with her grandsons' expedition from Ireland. Eventually, she went to Saint-Omer in Flanders, where she had earlier been exiled with her husband Godwin, Earl of Wessex in 1051. She never returned to England. The sons of Harold did not arrive until later in the year; the citizens of Bristol closed their gates to them and they were later defeated at Bleadon by the English earl Eadnoth the Staller, who was killed in the action. A second incursion into Devon was mounted by Harold's sons in 1069, this time from the south coast, but Exeter remained loyal to William and refused to support them.
