= Chew Valley hoard =

Hoard of 11th-century coins found in England

- Type: Hoard of 2,528 coins
- Discovered: 26 January 2019; Chew Valley, Somerset, England

The Chew Valley hoard is a hoard of 2,528 coins from the mid-11th century, very shortly after the Norman Conquest of England in 1066, that was found in the Chew Valley, Somerset, England, in 2019. It is one of the largest finds of Norman coins in the UK.

== Discovery ==
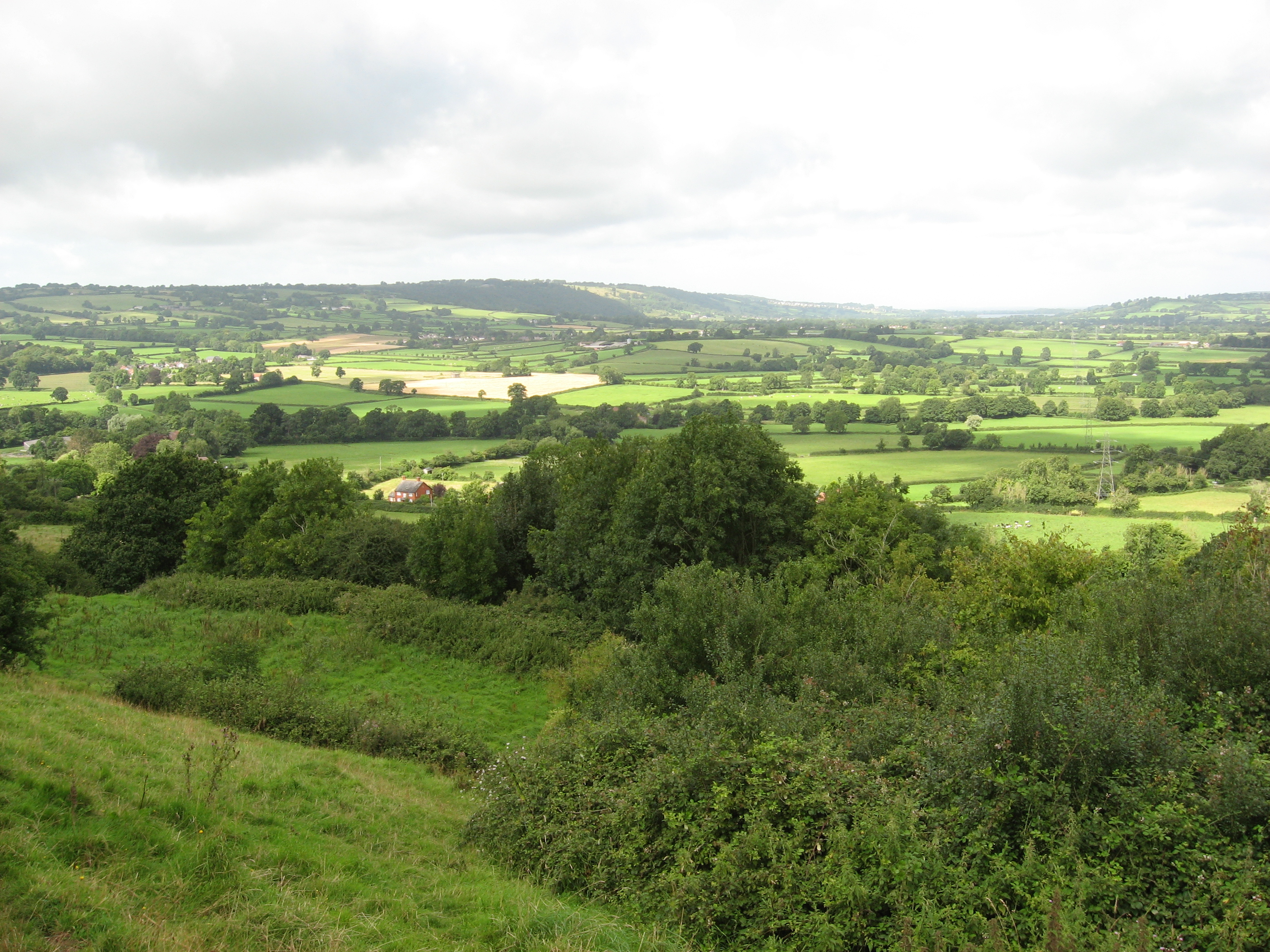
The landscape of the Chew Valley

The hoard was discovered near Bath, by metal detectorists Lisa Grace and Adam Staples, who were training five friends to use their metal detectors, on 26 January 2019.

== Items discovered ==
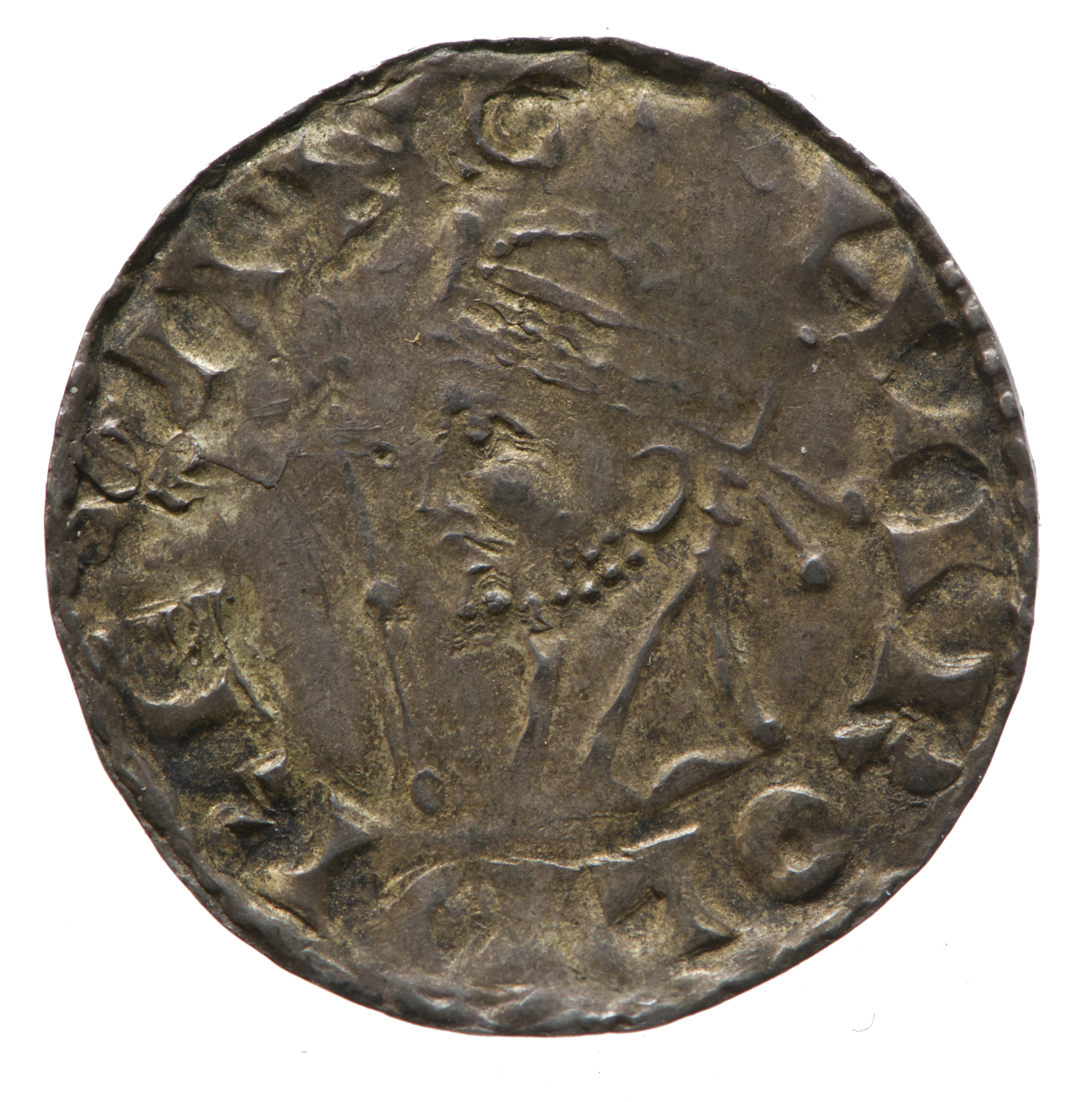
A silver penny of Harold II, similar to those in the hoard

The hoard consists of 2,528 silver coins, including 1,236 coins of Harold II and 1,310 coins of William I. The coins include some mules, coins which have the head of one king on one side and a design from a different king's reign on the other, as well as a number of "cut halfpennies" – penny coins cut in two to make the lower denomination.

== Purpose ==
The exact purpose of the hoard is unknown, but it has been speculated that some of the coins may represent an attempt at avoiding the taxes in place at the time by reusing designs from earlier coins. Some of the coins may come from previously unknown mints.

The likely date of burial of the hoard is 1067–1068, just a year or two after the Norman Conquest, and may reflect the instability in the country at the time. In 1067, Eadric the Wild had rebelled with the Welsh rulers of Gwynedd and Powys, and attacked Hereford; in 1068 William the Conqueror laid siege to Exeter; and later in 1068, the sons of the deposed King Harold, Godwine and Edmund, returned from Ireland, and raided the coast around the mouth of the River Avon and parts of Somerset. This latter event may have been the immediate impetus for the burial of the hoard.

== Inquest and valuation ==
In October 2024 the hoard was valued at £4.3 million. The charity South West Heritage Trust announced it had acquired the coins for the nation thanks to major funding including from the National Lottery Heritage Fund and the Art Fund.

Under the terms of the 1996 Treasure Act, a museum may purchase the hoard at the price valued by the Treasure Valuation Committee, with the purchase price being given jointly to the finders and landowner as a reward. In this case, the landowner will get 50%, and the two finders and their five companions will split the other 50% equally between them, by prior agreement.

== Conservation and display ==
The coins were examined and conserved at the British Museum, by a team led by senior conservator Pippa Pearce. The hoard is being displayed there as of October 2024, before touring the country. The hoard will eventually be displayed at the Museum of Somerset in Taunton.

== See also ==
- List of hoards in Britain
