= Battle of Northam =

Battle in 1068 in England

- Part of Norman Conquest of England
Date	1069
Location	Northam, Devon
Result	Norman victory

Belligerents
Anglo-Saxons; Kingdom of Leinster	Normans; Local Anglo-Saxon Militia

Commanders and leaders
Godwin, Edmund	Brian of Brittany; William De Vauville

Strength
Unknown	Unknown

Casualties and losses
1,700	Unknown, lower

The Battle of Northam, sometimes known as the Two Battles of Northam, (Note: Some historians describe the Battle of Cynuit as the first Battle of Northam. Nick Arnold describes the Battle of Northam as two battles on the same day.) was fought around Northam Parish, Devon in 1069 between a Norman force led by Brian of Brittany and an Anglo–Saxon army commanded by Godwin and Edmund, two sons of the late English king Harold Godwinson. The Normans inflicted heavy casualties on the Saxons and forced them to retreat from Devon.

== Background ==
On 14 October 1066, the English king, Harold Godwinson, was defeated and killed at the Battle of Hastings by the Duke of Normandy (known as William the Conqueror) and his forces. Although William had won the battle, it took several years for the Normans to consolidate their rule over England, with William facing a series of rebellions and border skirmishes in Dover, Exeter, Hereford, Nottingham, Durham, York and Peterborough. The problem for William was that he simply did not have the troops to enforce his will north of the Humber or in the West of England. (Note: The historian Paul Dalton suggests that the bulk of William's army, at this time, was stationed in southern England and the Welsh marches building castles.) The lack of overall control by William empowered many members of Harold's family to continue the fight against Norman rule. This included the likes of Harold's mother Gytha and his sons Godwin, Edmund, and Magnus by Harold's wife Edith. (Note: Edith's marriage was described as more danico (in the Danish fashion) which means unblessed by the church. By church law concubinage would not have been legally ratified, however it was largely acknowledged by custom.)

== Prelude ==
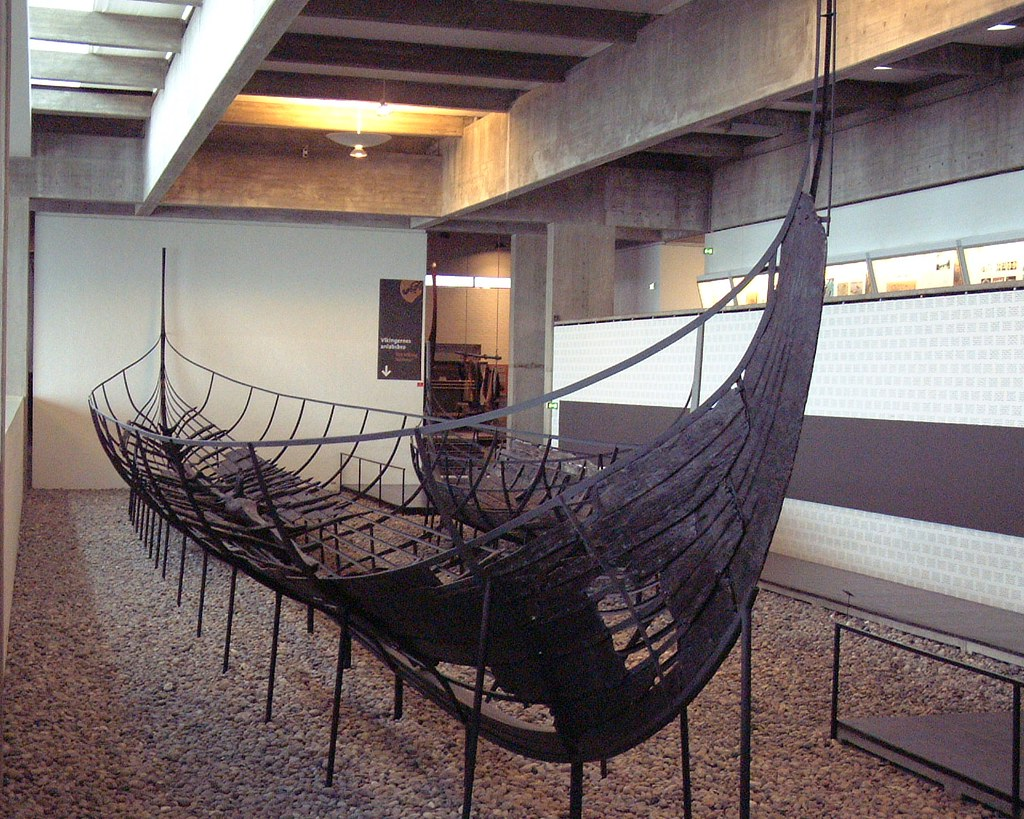
Viking ship Skuldelev 2, built in Ireland and datable to the eleventh century. In the Viking Ship Museum, Roskilde, Denmark

In 1067, unrest in the Welsh Marches and Dover had been suppressed without the intervention of William, now King of England. At the beginning of 1068 dissent in the West became more serious, with the people of Exeter rebelling. The king, possibly because Harold's mother Gytha and family were based there, led an army, that included some English, to besiege the walled city of Exeter. After an 18-day siege the city surrendered and Gytha fled. The Anglo-Saxon Chronicle for 1067 said:

This year Harold's mother, Githa, and the wives of many good men with her, went to the Steep Holmes, (Note: Modern day Flat Holm in the Severn Estuary.) and there abode some time; and afterwards went from thence over sea to St. Omer's.

— Giles 1914, A. 1067

While William was besieging Exeter, an invasion fleet led by Harold's three sons, Godwin, Edmund and Magnus, set sail from Ireland and raided southwest England. The fleet of 52 ships was provided by Diarmait, the High King of Ireland, who had previously helped their father, in 1052. By the time they arrived in Devon, William had gone, although he left a large force to defend the area. The defending force was headed by Eadnoth the Staller, an Anglo-Saxon landowner, who was named in Domesday Book as having held 30 manors throughout Devon, Wiltshire, Somerset and Dorset before the Norman conquest. At what became known as the Battle of Bleadon he led a combined Anglo-Norman army against Harold II's sons and their forces. So it is likely that the Anglo-Saxons of these counties gave their allegiance to William the Conqueror and that the sons of Harold II would now face the county fyrds in alliance with the Norman conquerors. The exact outcome of the battle is unknown, but Eadnoth was killed, and the brothers retreated to their ships. Magnus is not mentioned in any of the contemporary records after this battle, so it is not clear what happened to him. (Note: There is some evidence that he ended his days as a hermit in Sussex.) After the Battle of Bleadon Harold's sons continued to raid the coast of Devon and Cornwall, before eventually returning to Ireland with their plunder.

== Battles ==
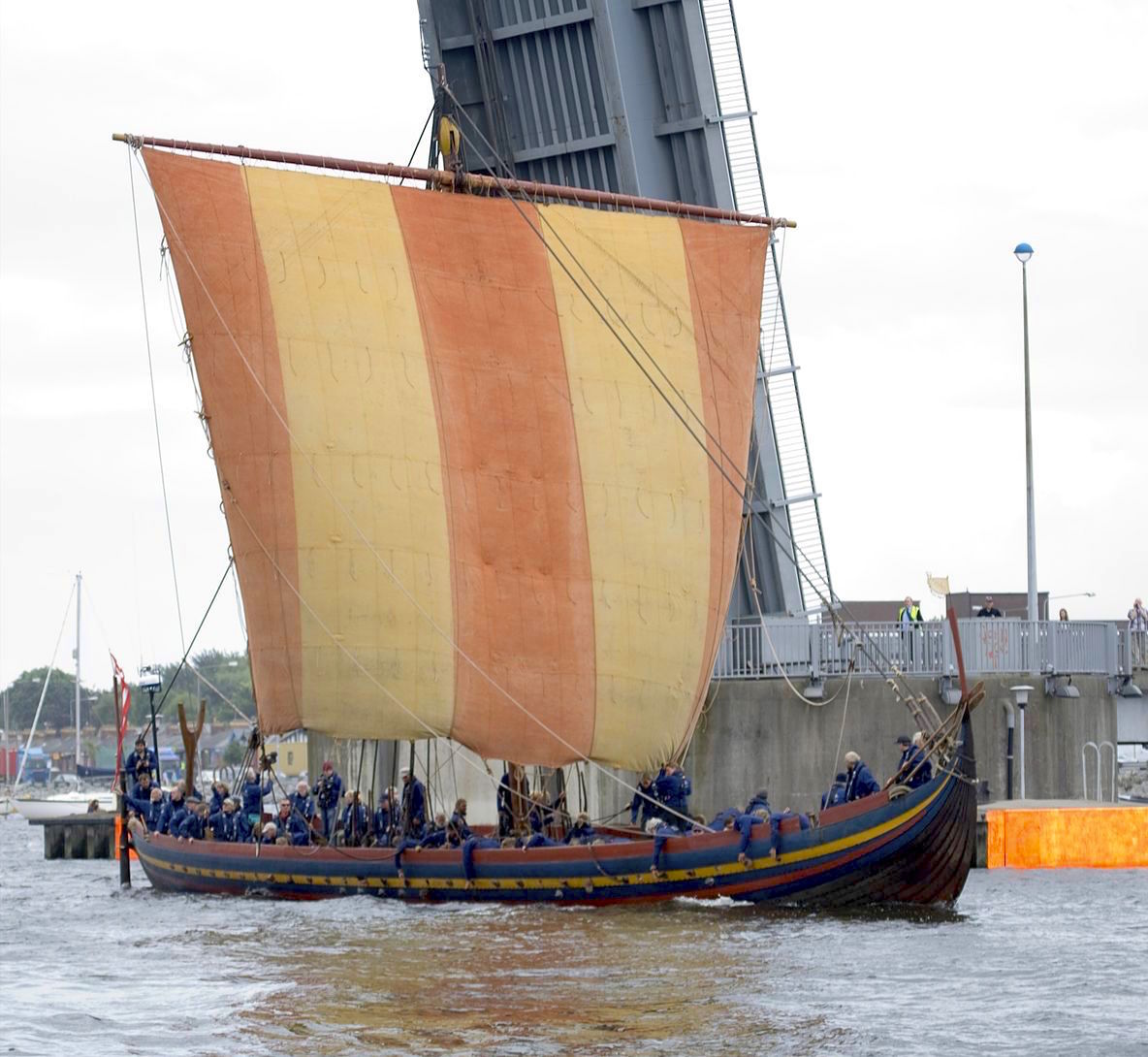
Reconstruction of a Viking ship, based on the design of the Skuldelev 2, in Dublin harbour.

In June 1069, Godwin and Edmund returned with their army and over sixty ships. (Note: The Anglo-Saxon Chronicle says sixty four ships and William of Jumièges sixty six) The landing was at Appledore, a small village on the north Devon coast. They advanced to Northam and began raiding the area. It is likely that this was the site of the first battle of the day, as the Norman army, now under command of the king’s second cousin, Brian of Brittany, and the noble William De Vauville (Note: According to Green 'William De Vauville' was mentioned as castellan of Exeter: BL Cotton MS Vespasian A XVIII, ff. 1571-162v, and probably to be identified with William ‘Gualdi’, co- commander of a force sent against the sons of King Harold in 1069.) quickly arrived in the area and attacked the brothers forces.

After this came Harold’s sons from Ireland, at Midsummer, with 64 ships into the mouth of the Taw, and there heedlessly landed; and Earl Brian [Brian of Brittany] came against them unawares with no small band, and fought against them.

— Anglo–Saxon Chronicle Manuscript D, Jebson 2007, A. 1068 for 1069

The exact size of both armies is unknown. However, Brian was supported by a troop of Breton knights, with other sources suggesting that William De Vauville was the Sheriff of Devon. (Note: William De Vauville was in charge of the garrison at Exeter castle but was replaced when Baldwin de Moeles (or de Brionne) was appointed sheriff by William I .) The sheriff was responsible for calling out the Anglo-Saxon fyrd. This would explain how the Normans had a superior force to that of Godwin and Edmund.

The scattered raiders were quickly pushed back to Appledore, where they joined up with the rest of their army. There they discovered that their ships were not ready to sail as the tide was out. (Note: In the eleventh century it was usual for ships to depart on the high tide. It has been calculated that on the day of the battle, the high tide would have been in the early evening.) The troops were forced to stay and fight the second battle of the day while they waited for high tide.

For many hours the Normans launched repeated attacks against the raiders shield wall, in almost exactly the same way the early stages of the Battle of Hastings had played out. The raiders line never broke, but they suffered heavy casualties. As night came, the tide finally returned, and the brothers army escaped to sea, ending the battle.

== Aftermath ==
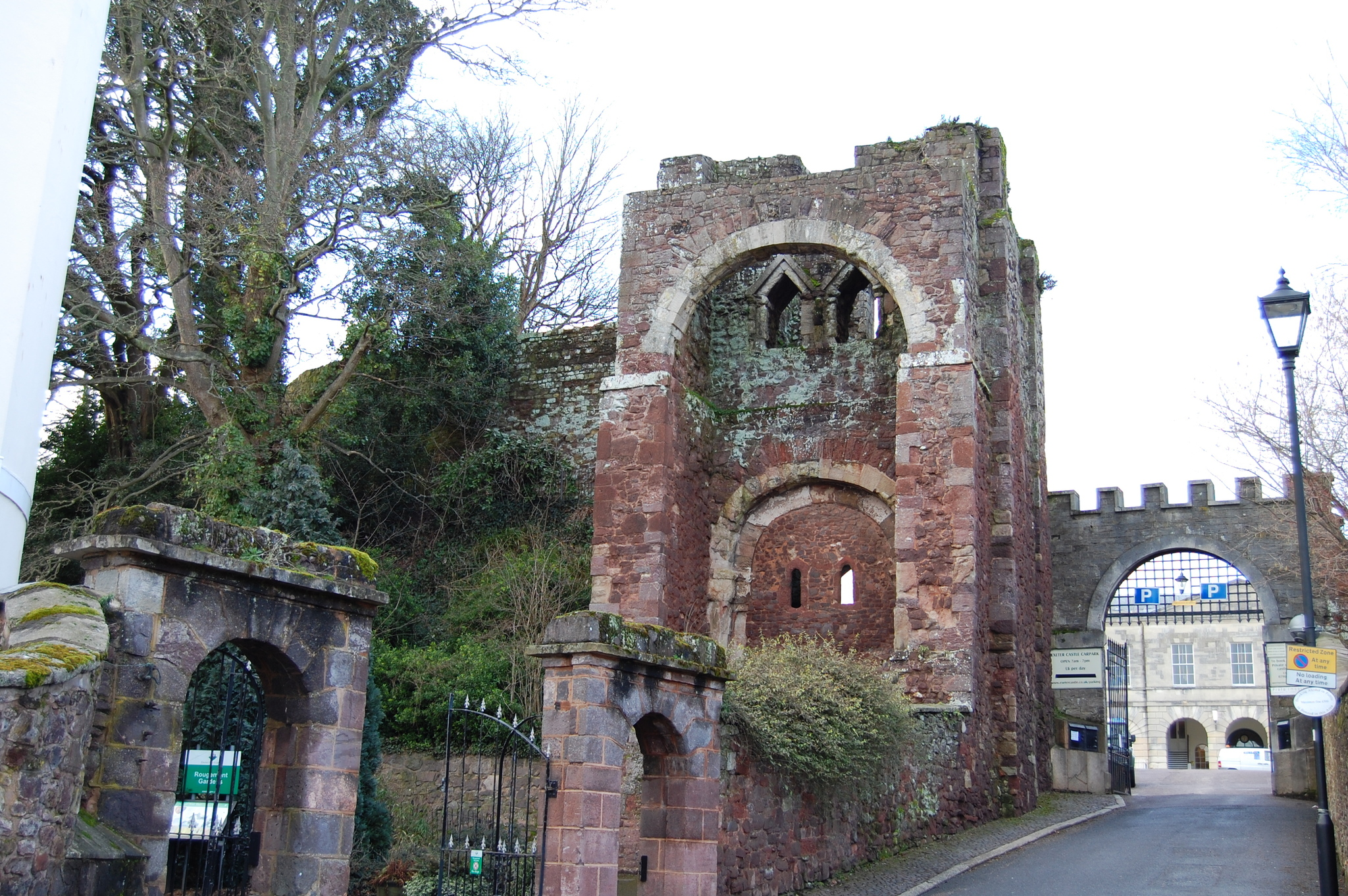
The gatehouse of Exeter Castle, known more commonly as Rougemont Castle. William the Conqueror made Baldwin FitzGilbert the superintendence of the Castle’s construction, and its future custodian.

According to William of Jumièges, the brothers forces had taken 1,700 casualties. The Anglo–Saxon Chronicle claimed that the survivors fled to their ships, having lost their best men. None of the brothers were reported as killed and it is thought that they returned to Ireland, where Diarmat told them he either could not or would not supply them with more forces. The brothers moved on to Denmark, possibly hoping to receive new help from King Sweyn II Estridsson. However, that help clearly must not have come, since the brothers soon disappeared from history. The chronicler Orderic Vitalis wrote that after the battle and the surrender of Exeter with favourable terms, a castle was established and William the Conqueror led his army into Cornwall, where he 'put down every disturbance that came to his attention'. The Battle of Northam marks the end of the attempts of Harold’s successors to reclaim the throne of England.

== Sources ==
- Arnold, Nick (2014). "The Defeat of the sons of Harold in 1069". Report and Transactions. 146. Barnstable: The Devonshire Association: 33–56.
- Barlow, Frank (2013). The Godwins: The Rise and Fall of a Noble Dynasty. Abingdon: Routledge. ISBN 978-0-582-78440-6.
- Bates, David (2004). William the Conqueror. Cheltenham, Gloucestershire: The History Press. p. 290. ISBN 978-0752429601.
- Bates, David (2016). William the Conqueror. Yale University Press publications. ISBN 978-03001-1875-9.
- Connolly, Sharon Bennett (14 October 2018). "The Wives and Family of King Harold II". History... the interesting bits!.
- Dalton, Paul; et al. (2002). Conquest, Anarchy and Lordship: Yorkshire, 1066–1154. Cambridge, England: Cambridge University Press. ISBN 0-521-52464-4.
- Giles, J. A. (1914). The Anglo-Saxon Chronicle . London: G. Bell and Sons Ltd. – via Wikisource.
- Green, Judith A (1990). English sheriffs to 1154. London: HMSO. ISBN 0-11-440236-1.
- Hagger, Mark (2012). William, King and Conqueror. London: I.B. Tauris. ISBN 978-1-78076-354-5.
- Horspool, David (2009). The English Rebel. London: Penguin. ISBN 978-0-670-91619-1. ASIN 0141025476.
- Huscroft, Richard (2009). The Norman Conquest: A New Introduction. London: Routledge. ISBN 978-1405811552.
- Huscroft, Richard (2016). Ruling England 1042-1217. London: Routledge. ISBN 978-1138786554.
- Jebson, Tony (2007). "Anglo-Saxon Chronicle D Manuscript".
- Morris, Marc (2012). The Norman Conquest. London: Windmill Books. ISBN 978-0-09-953744-1.
- Orderic Vitalis (1968–1980), Chibnall, Marjorie (ed.), The Ecclesiastical History of Orderic Vitalis, 6 volumes, translated by Chibnall, Marjorie, OUP, ISBN 0-19-820220-2
- Ross, Margaret Clunies (1985). "Concubinage in Anglo-Saxon England". Past & Present. 108 (108). Oxford University Press on behalf of The Past and Present Society: 3–34. doi:10.1093/past/108.1.3. JSTOR 650572.
- Sharpe, R (2016). "The Earliest Norman Sheriffs". History. 101 (347). Wiley: 485–94. JSTOR 26624553.
- Tillott, P. M., ed. (1961). "Before the Norman Conquest". A History of the County of York: the City of York. Victoria County History. London: British History Online. pp. 2–24.
- Viking Ship Museum (2023). "Sea Stallion from Glendalough". Vikinges Kibs Museet. Archived from the original on 22 September 2020.
- Williams, Ann (2004). "Eadnoth the Staller (d. 1068)". Oxford Dictionary of National Biography (online ed.). Oxford University Press. doi:10.1093/ref:odnb/8384. (Subscription, Wikipedia Library access or UK public library membership required.)
- William of Jumièges (1995). Van Houts, Elisabeth M. C (ed.). The Gesta Normannorum Ducum of William of Jumièges, Orderic Vitalis and Robert of Torigni. Translated by Elisabeth M. C. Van Houts. Oxford: Clarendon Press.
