= Magnus, son of Harold Godwinson =

Son of English king

Magnus (fl. 1068) was a son of Harold Godwinson, King of England. He was, in all likelihood, driven into exile in Dublin by the Norman conquest of England, along with two of his brothers, and from there took part in one, or perhaps two, expeditions to south-western England, but with little military success. They probably cost him his life.

== Parentage and upbringing ==
Magnus's precise date of birth is unknown, but can be estimated from the fact that his elder brother is thought to have been born in the mid- or late 1040s. His family was one of the most powerful in Anglo-Saxon England: his paternal grandfather was Godwin, Earl of Wessex, and his father was Harold Godwinson, who at about this time inherited the same title. His mother, Edith Swan-neck, was married to Harold more danico, "in the Danish manner", that is to say they had a form of marriage which was not recognized by the Church but which was at the time widely considered legitimate among the laity. Harold Harefoot, for example, succeeded to the throne despite being the son of such a marriage between king Cnut and Ælfgifu of Northampton. Harold Godwinson had five sons, probably not by the same mother, and Magnus seems to have been either the second or third of these. Magnus was almost certainly named after Magnus the Good, king of Norway, who was himself the first to bear that Christian name. Magnus Haroldson can be presumed to have received an education befitting the son of a great nobleman, with the emphasis on gaining military and diplomatic skills, and though he was apparently too young to fight for his father, now king of England, at the Battle of Hastings, he had opportunities to use these skills in the next few years.

== Resistance in south-west England ==
Harold Godwinson's defeat and death at Hastings were a disaster for his family, especially since the English magnates in London responded by electing as king not one of Harold's sons but Edgar Ætheling, a great-nephew of Edward the Confessor. Edgar's brief "reign" – he was never actually crowned – ended when William the Conqueror reached London in December 1066. Magnus's grandmother Gytha, the widow of Earl Godwin, retreated to the south-west of England to consolidate her power in that still unconquered part of the country, but at the beginning of 1068 William led his army against her, and besieged her in Exeter. Magnus is not specifically mentioned in contemporary sources as being part of this south-western rebellion, but it is very likely that he and his brothers Godwin and Edmund were there, asserting their claim to be leaders of the English opposition. After eighteen days Exeter submitted to William, but by that time Gytha, and perhaps her grandchildren, had escaped and taken refuge on an island in the Bristol Channel, probably Steep Holm.

== Raids from Ireland ==
That summer Magnus's brother Godwin was in Dublin under the protection of king Diarmait of Leinster, who had many years previously given refuge similarly to his father. Godwin was accompanied by Edmund and Magnus, if we are to believe the chronicler John of Worcester, or by Edmund and his first cousin Tostig (a son of Swein Godwinson) if we believe the Anglo-Norman chronicler Geoffrey Gaimar. They seem to have had Harold Godwinson's remaining housecarls in their service, and still had the resources to make Diarmait gifts such as the "battle standard of the king of the Saxons" mentioned by the Annals of Inisfallen, and to hire a force of mercenaries. With a fleet of 52 ships they sailed to the Bristol Channel and first harried the area around the mouth of the river Avon, then attacked Bristol, and after being driven off by the townspeople they sailed back to the Somerset coast and landed again. They may have expected a welcome there and planned to recruit more men, since Godwin's only landholdings at the death of Edward the Confessor had been two small manors in Somerset at Nettlecombe and Langford-in-Burrington, but if so they were disappointed. They encountered a local force under the command of Eadnoth the Staller which fought a bloody battle with them at Bleadon. Eadnoth was one of the fatalities, and possibly also Magnus. After harrying Devon and Cornwall the surviving brothers returned to Dublin, richer but having won no great military success. It is, to sum up, uncertain if Magnus took part in this raid, and if he did take part it is uncertain whether he survived it.

There is no further explicit mention of Magnus by any contemporary source, but it is recorded that two unnamed sons of Harold made a second raid on south-west England in the summer of 1069 which ended with the disastrous Battle of Northam fought in Devon against the forces of Brian of Brittany, resulting in the deaths of "all the best men" of the brothers' expedition.

== Tradition of his survival ==
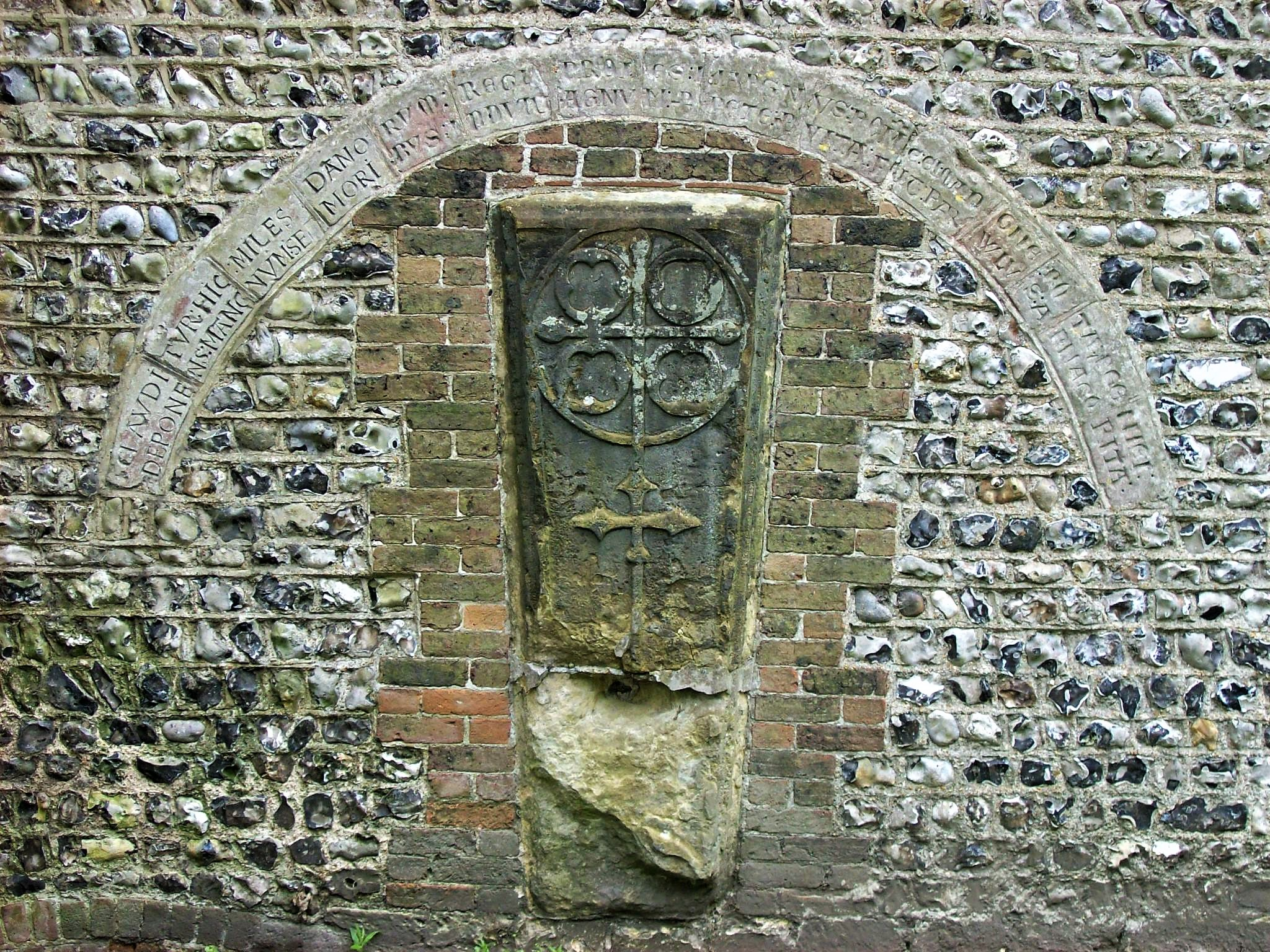
The Magnus inscription

One possible clue hints that Magnus may have survived these events and gone into religious retirement in Sussex, the original home of the House of Godwin. An ancient monument now built into an outer wall of the Church of St John sub Castro, Lewes has a Latin inscription which has been translated thus:

There enters this cell a warrior of Denmark's royal race; Magnus his name, mark of mighty lineage. Casting off his Mightiness he takes the lamb's mildness, and to gain everlasting life becomes a lowly anchorite.

A tradition recorded in the early 19th century states that this was Magnus Haroldson, and certainly he was a relation of the Danish royal family through his great-uncle Ulf, father of King Sweyn II. This interpretation was taken seriously by the eminent historian Frank Barlow, though the style of lettering of the inscription may be of too late a date, perhaps c. 1200.

It has also been postulated by historian Tomasz Jurek, that a man identified by the chronicler Gallus Anonymus as Magnus, Count of Wrocław, a royal who arrived in the 1070s from a land that had just fallen under the yoke of foreign rule, was in fact Magnus Haroldson. Following the defeat of Harold by the Norman William the Conqueror, Magnus' sister Gytha of Wessex and at least two of her brothers (believed by some to be Godwin and Edmund) escaped to the court of their first cousin once-removed, King Sweyn II of Denmark. Gytha later married Vladimir II Monomakh, who would later become Grand Duke of Kievan Rus.

The flag of the Duchy of Masovia, which included the West Saxon wyvern

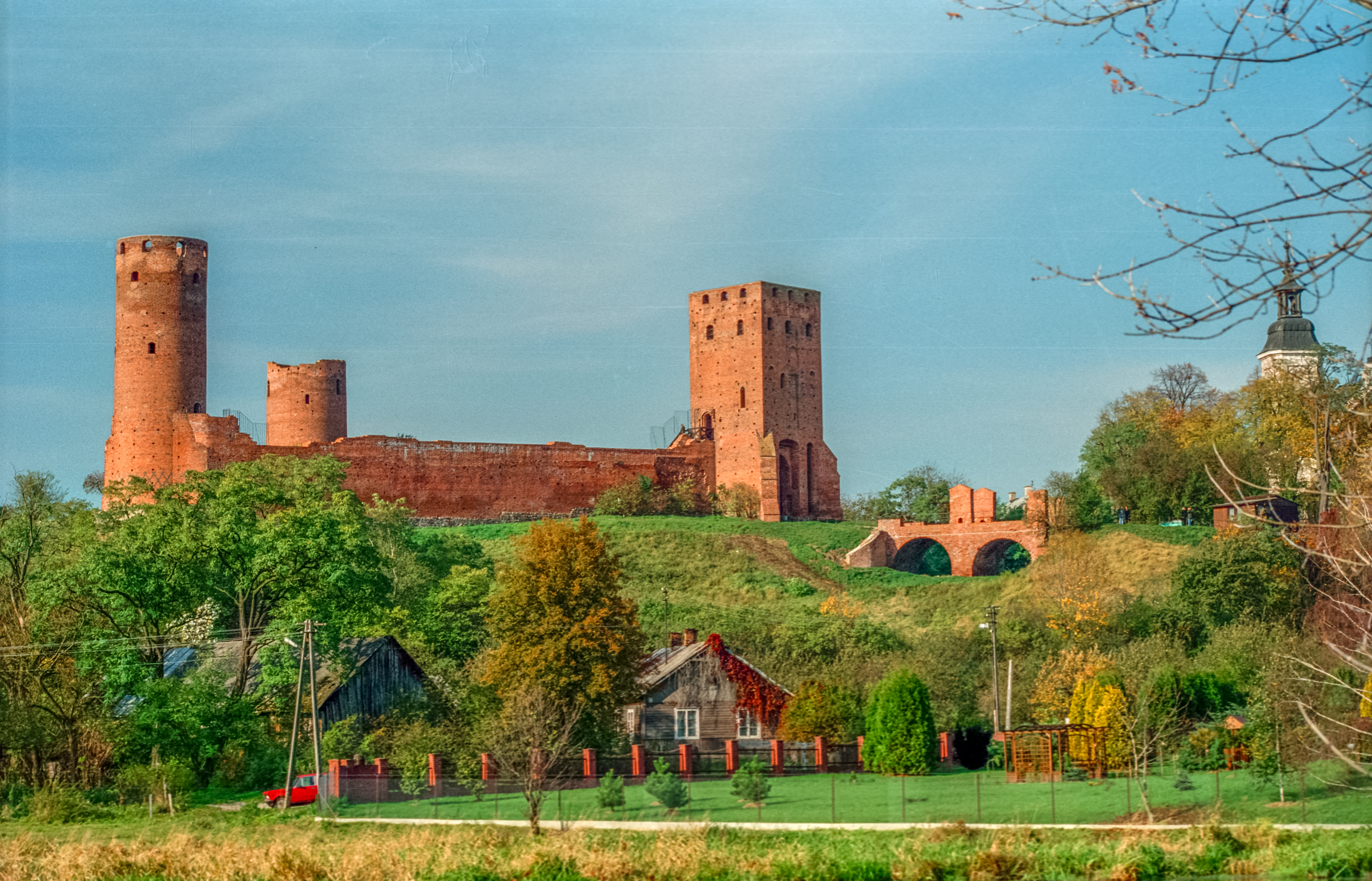
Czersk Castle

Polish historian and genealogist Marek Skarbek-Kozietulski, working off the premise laid out by Jurek, theorized that Haroldson, following his stay in Denmark trekked to Poland and entered into a strategic marriage to a woman he believed to be an unrecorded sister of King Bolesław II the Generous. Skarbek-Kozietulski had also discussed an idea first put forward by Krzysztof Benyskiewicz that Bolesław II's wife (whose ancestry has never been accurately confirmed) was in fact an illegitimate daughter of Sweyn II of Denmark and that it was arranged for Haroldson to marry one of her sisters, thereby making him brother-in-law to Bolesław and providing an explanation of Magnus' newfound title and status. Regardless of to whom Magnus eventually married, Skarbek-Kozietulsk believed that these theories, along with the sudden appearance of the West Saxon wyvern in the flag and coat of arms of the later Duchy of Masovia, which was previously unknown in Polish heraldry, and the Y-DNA haoplogroup I1 subclades I1-ASP and I1-T2 (both of which are originally found in England and Denmark) being found within various Polish noble families, give weight to the theory that Magnus Haroldson was in fact Magnus, Count of Wrocław. (A counterargument is that Norwegian male-line descendants of Earl Godwin belong to the British haplogroup R-L21.)

A township near to the castle of Czersk where his supposed remains were exhumed in 1966 is called Magnuszew. Twentieth century historians also believed that Magnus, Count of Wrocław was the grandfather of Piotr Włostowic, voivode of Duke Bolesław III Wrymouth (nephew of Bolesław II) and progenitor of the Duninowie clan.
