= Edith Recovering Harold's Body after the Battle of Hastings =

Painting by Horace Vernet

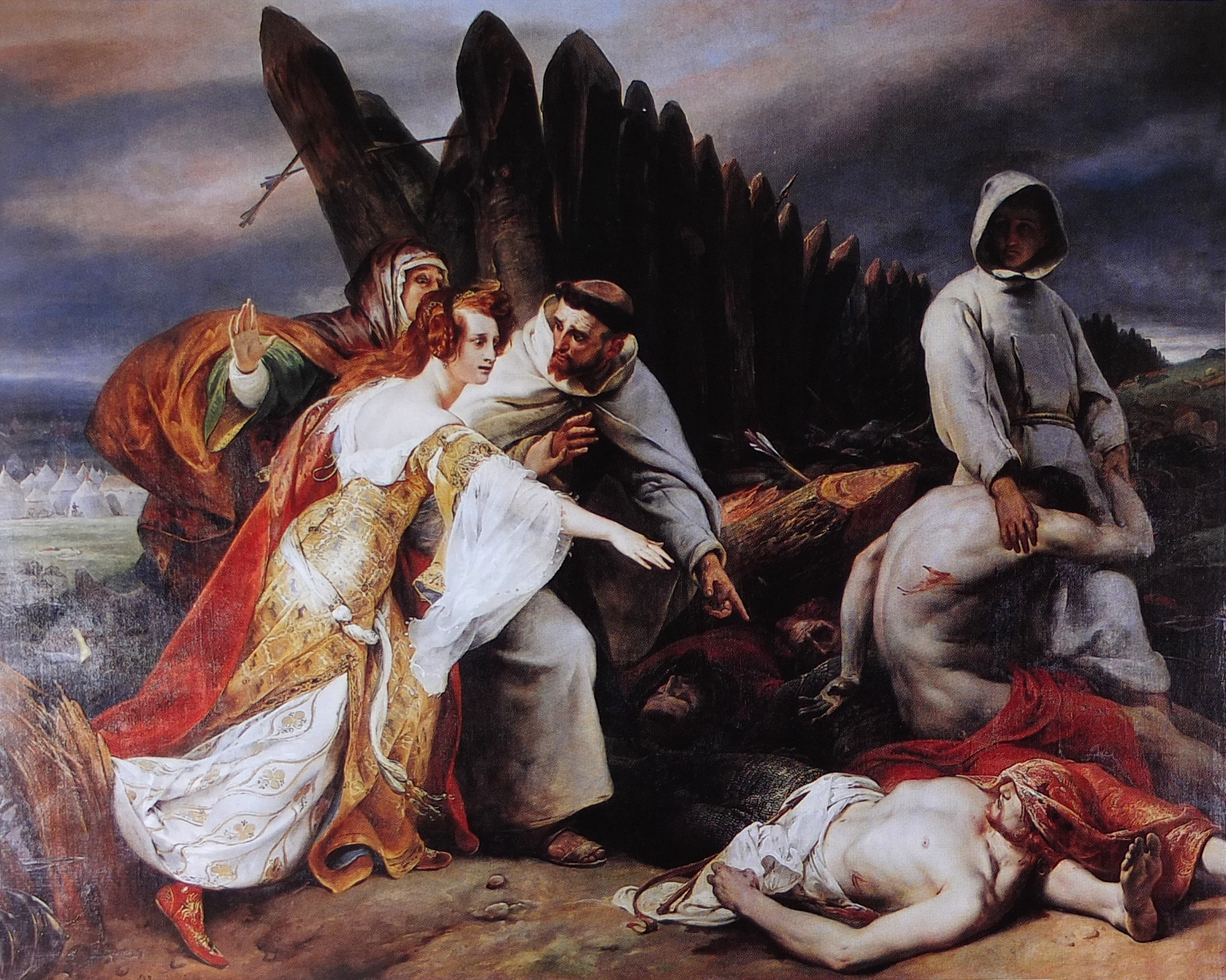
- Artist: Horace Vernet
- Year: 1827
- Type: Oil on canvas, history painting
- Dimensions: 370 cm × 430 cm (150 in × 170 in)
- Location: Musée Thomas-Henry, Cherbourg

Edith Recovering Harold's Body after the Battle of Hastings is an 1827 history painting by the French artist Horace Vernet. It depicts the aftermath of the Battle of Hastings in 1066 during the Norman Conquest of England, where the English monarch Harold Godwinson was defeated and killed in the fighting.

== History and description ==
The painting shows a famous scene as Edith the Fair, accompanied by some monks, scoured the battlefield for her husband, the fallen Harold. Edith, in the company of an older woman, and a monk, both point to the dead body of the king. He is lying in a broken palisade, partially naked, with a sheet hiding his face which has been disfigured by an arrow.

British historical themes were very fashionable in France during the Restoration era, particularly those of Walter Scott. Vernet produced several paintings including this one.

It was one of several historical paintings Vernet exhibited at the Paris Salon of 1827. In 1828 it was exhibited in London at William Armfield Hobday's gallery in Pall Mall. Today it is in the collection of Musée Thomas-Henry in Cherbourg.

== Bibliography ==
- Fahy, Everett (ed.) The Wrightsman Pictures. Metropolitan Museum of Art, 2005.
- Harkett, Daniel & Hornstein, Katie (ed.) Horace Vernet and the Thresholds of Nineteenth-Century Visual Culture. Dartmouth College Press, 2017.
- Ruutz-Rees, Janet Emily. Horace Vernet. Scribner and Welford, 1880.
