= Edmund, son of Harold Godwinson =

English prince (flourished 1068–1069)

Edmund or Eadmund (fl. 1068 – 1069) was a son of Harold Godwinson, King of England. He was driven into exile in Dublin by the Norman conquest of England, along with two of his brothers, and from there he twice took part in expeditions to south-western England, but with little success. He disappears from history in the early 1070s.

== Parentage and upbringing ==
Edmund's precise date of birth is unknown, but can be estimated from the fact that his elder brother is thought to have been born in the mid- or late 1040s. His family was one of the most powerful in Anglo-Saxon England: his paternal grandfather was Godwin, Earl of Wessex, and his father was Harold Godwinson, who at about this time inherited the same title. His mother, Edith Swan-neck, was married to Harold more danico, "in the Danish manner", that is to say they had a form of marriage which was not recognized by the Church but which was at the time widely considered legitimate among the laity. Harold Harefoot, for example, succeeded to the throne despite being the son of such a marriage between king Cnut and Ælfgifu of Northampton. Harold Godwinson had five sons, probably not by the same mother, and Edmund seems to have been either the second or third of these. Edmund was probably named after Edmund Ironside, the English king who in his short reign led the resistance to the Danish invasion. Edmund Haroldson can be presumed to have received an education befitting the son of a great nobleman, with the emphasis on gaining military and diplomatic skills, and though he was apparently too young to fight for his father, now king of England, at the Battle of Hastings, he had opportunities to use these skills in the next few years.

== Resistance in south-west England ==
Harold Godwinson's defeat and death at Hastings were a disaster for his family, especially since the English magnates in London responded by electing as king not one of Harold's sons but Edgar Ætheling, a great-nephew of Edward the Confessor. Edgar's brief "reign" – he was never actually crowned – ended when William the Conqueror reached London in December 1066. Edmund's grandmother Gytha, the widow of Earl Godwin, retreated to the south-west of England to consolidate her power in that still unconquered part of the country, but at the beginning of 1068 William led his army against her, and besieged her in Exeter. Edmund is not specifically mentioned in contemporary sources as being part of this south-western rebellion, but it is very likely that he and his brothers Godwin and Magnus were there, asserting their claim to be leaders of the English opposition. After eighteen days Exeter submitted to William, but by that time Gytha, and perhaps her grandchildren, had escaped and taken refuge on an island in the Bristol Channel, probably Steep Holm.

== Raids from Ireland ==
That summer Edmund was in Dublin under the protection of king Diarmait of Leinster, who had many years previously given refuge similarly to his father. Edmund was accompanied by his brothers Godwin and Magnus, if we are to believe the chronicler John of Worcester, or by Godwin and his first cousin Tostig (a son of Swein Godwinson) if we believe the Anglo-Norman chronicler Geoffrey Gaimar. They seem to have had Harold Godwinson's remaining housecarls in their service, and still had the resources to make Diarmait gifts such as the "battle standard of the king of the Saxons" mentioned by the Annals of Inisfallen, and to hire a force of mercenaries. With a fleet of 52 ships they sailed to the Bristol Channel and first harried the area around the mouth of the river Avon, then attacked Bristol, and after being driven off by the townspeople they sailed back to the Somerset coast and landed again. They may have expected a welcome there and planned to recruit more men, since Godwin's only landholdings at the death of Edward the Confessor had been two small manors in Somerset at Nettlecombe and Langford-in-Burrington, but if so they were disappointed. They encountered a local force under the command of Eadnoth the Staller which fought a bloody battle with them at Bleadon. Eadnoth was one of the fatalities, and possibly also Edmund's brother Magnus. After harrying Devon and Cornwall the surviving brothers returned to Dublin, richer but having won no great military success.

In the summer of 1069 another raid was launched from Dublin, but this time, the sources tell us, by only two of the sons of Harold, whom they do not name. This time they sailed in 64 ships to Exeter, which they failed to take, and then ravaged parts of the south coast of Devon and perhaps the Lizard peninsula in Cornwall before rounding Land's End and landing, "incautiously" as the Anglo-Saxon Chronicle says, in the estuary of the river Taw on the north coast of Devon. After pillaging the area around Barnstaple they took their forces into the hinterland and at the Battle of Northam encountered an army under the command of Brian of Brittany, which, to quote the Chronicle again, "slew all the best men from the [brothers'] troops while the few survivors escaped to their ships". The two raids had been politically and militarily disastrous, and had only demonstrated that the memory of their father's reign could not gain them any supporters in the south-west.

== Flanders to Denmark ==
It is likely that Godwin and Edmund accompanied their sister Gytha, aunt Gunnhild, and grandmother Gytha when they fled to St Omer in Flanders in, perhaps, late 1069 or early 1070. It is certain that they later went on to the court of king Swein Estrithson in Denmark along with the younger Gytha. They doubtless hoped that Swein would support them in an invasion of England, but he did not; Swein had recently failed badly in a similar attempt on his own behalf and he can have had little inclination to try again on theirs, especially since there was bad blood between the two families, Swein's brother having long ago been murdered by a brother of Harold Godwinson. Gytha was married off to Vladimir Monomakh, Prince of Smolensk, probably in 1074 or 1075, but Godwin and Edmund make no further appearance in history. The date of their deaths is unknown.
