= Gyrth =

Gyrth (Old English: Gyrð) is a masculine given name. Notable people with this name include:

- Gyrth Godwinson (c. 1032–1066), brother of Harold Godwinson, king of England
- Gyrth Russell (1892–1970), Anglo-Canadian artist

== See also ==
- The Gyrth Chalice Mystery, 1931 crime novel
- Girth (disambiguation)
