= Godwin, son of Harold Godwinson =

Son of King of England

Godwin or Godwine (fl. 1066 – 1069) was a son, probably the eldest son, of Harold Godwinson, King of England. He was driven into exile in Dublin, along with two of his brothers, by the Norman conquest of England, and from there he twice led expeditions to south-western England, but with little success.

== Parentage and upbringing ==
Godwin's precise date of birth is unknown, but it was probably in the mid- to late 1040s. His family was one of the most powerful in Anglo-Saxon England: his paternal grandfather was Godwin, Earl of Wessex, and his father was Harold Godwinson, who would soon inherit the same title. His mother, Edith Swan-neck, was married to Harold more danico, "in the Danish manner", that is to say they had a form of marriage which was not recognized by the Church but which was at the time widely considered legitimate among the laity. Harold Harefoot, for example, succeeded to the throne despite being the son of such a marriage between king Cnut and Ælfgifu of Northampton. Harold Godwinson had five sons, probably not by the same mother, but several pieces of evidence combine to indicate that Godwin was the eldest; namely, that he is the only one recorded in Domesday Book as holding land in 1066, he was named first by the chronicler John of Worcester when listing Harold's eldest sons, and he was the one named after Harold's father. Godwin can be presumed to have received an education befitting the son of a great nobleman, with the emphasis on gaining military and diplomatic skills, and though he was apparently too young to fight for his father, now king of England, at the Battle of Hastings, he had opportunities to use these skills in the next few years.

== Resistance in south-west England ==
Harold Godwinson's defeat and death at Hastings were a disaster for his family, especially since the English magnates in London responded by electing as king not one of Harold's sons but Edgar Ætheling, a great-nephew of Edward the Confessor. Edgar's brief "reign" – he was never actually crowned – ended when William the Conqueror reached London in December 1066. Godwin Haroldson's grandmother Gytha, the widow of Earl Godwin, retreated to the south-west of England to consolidate her power in that still unconquered part of the country, but at the beginning of 1068 William led his army against her, and besieged her in Exeter. Godwin is not specifically mentioned in contemporary sources as being part of this south-western rebellion, but it is very likely that he and his brothers Edmund and Magnus were there, asserting their claim to be leaders of the English opposition. After eighteen days Exeter submitted to William, but by that time Gytha, and perhaps her grandchildren, had escaped and taken refuge on an island in the Bristol Channel, probably Steep Holm.

== Raids from Ireland ==
That summer Godwin was in Dublin under the protection of king Diarmait of Leinster, who had many years previously given refuge similarly to his father. Godwin was accompanied by his brothers Edmund and Magnus, if we are to believe the chronicler John of Worcester, or by Edmund and his first cousin Hakon (a son of Swein Godwinson) if we believe the Anglo-Norman chronicler Geoffrey Gaimar. They seem to have had Harold Godwinson's remaining housecarls in their service, and still had the resources to make Diarmait gifts such as the "battle standard of the king of the Saxons" mentioned by the Annals of Inisfallen, and to hire a force of mercenaries. With a fleet of 52 ships they sailed to the Bristol Channel and first harried the area around the mouth of the river Avon, then attacked Bristol, and after being driven off by the townspeople they sailed back to the Somerset coast and landed again. They may have expected a welcome there and planned to recruit more men, since Godwin's only landholdings at the death of Edward the Confessor had been two small manors in Somerset at Nettlecombe and Langford-in-Burrington, but if so they were disappointed. They encountered a local force under the command of Eadnoth the Staller which fought a bloody battle with them at Bleadon. Eadnoth was one of the fatalities, and possibly also Godwin's brother Magnus. After harrying Devon and Cornwall Godwin returned to Dublin, richer but having won no great military success.

In the summer of 1069 another raid was launched from Dublin, but this time, the sources tell us, by only two of the sons of Harold, whom they do not name. This time they sailed in 64 ships to Exeter, which they failed to take, and then ravaged parts of the south coast of Devon and perhaps the Lizard peninsula in Cornwall before rounding Land's End and landing, "incautiously" as the Anglo-Saxon Chronicle says, in the estuary of the river Taw on the north coast of Devon. After pillaging the area around Barnstaple they took their forces into the hinterland and at the Battle of Northam encountered an army under the command of Brian of Brittany, which, to quote the Chronicle again, "slew all the best men from the [brothers'] troops while the few survivors escaped to their ships". The two raids had been politically and militarily disastrous, and had only demonstrated that the memory of their father's reign could not gain them any supporters in the south-west.

== Flanders to Denmark and East ==
It is likely that Godwin and Edmund accompanied their sister Gytha, aunt Gunnhild, and grandmother Gytha when they fled to St Omer in Flanders in, perhaps, late 1069 or early 1070. It is certain that they later went on to the court of king Swein Estrithson in Denmark, along with the younger Gytha. They doubtless hoped that Swein would support them in an invasion of England, but he did not; Swein had recently failed badly in a similar attempt on his own behalf and he can have had little inclination to try again on theirs, especially since there was bad blood between the two families, Swein's brother having long ago been murdered by a brother of Harold Godwinson. Gytha was married off to Vladimir Monomakh, Prince of Smolensk and Novgorod, probably in 1074 or 1075.
