= Gytha of Wessex =

Daughter of Harold Godwinson (died 1098/1107)

- Born: c. 1053/1061
- Died: 1098 or 1107
- Spouse: Vladimir II Monomakh
- Issue: Mstislav I of Kiev; Izyaslav Vladimirovich; Svyatoslav Vladimirovich; Yaropolk II of Kiev; Viacheslav I of Kiev; Yuri Dolgorukiy (possibly)
- House: Godwin (by birth); Rurik (by marriage)
- Father: Harold Godwinson
- Mother: Edith the Fair

Gytha of Wessex (c. 1053/1061 – 1098 or 1107; Old English: Gȳð) was one of several daughters of Harold Godwinson, the last Anglo-Saxon king of England, and his consort, Edith the Fair. Through marriage to Vladimir II Monomakh, Gytha became the princess of Smolensk around 1074 or 1075.

== Life ==
Her paternal grandparents were Godwin, Earl of Wessex and Gytha Thorkelsdóttir.

According to the 13th-century chronicler Saxo Grammaticus, after the death of their father King Harold at the Battle of Hastings in 1066, Gytha and two of her brothers (probably Magnus and either Godwin or Edmund) escaped to the court of their first cousin once-removed, King Sweyn Estridsson of Denmark. The two brothers were treated by Sweyn with hospitality, Magnus entering into high-level service with Bolesław II the Generous. This took place in 1069–1070, when Bolesław restored Iziaslav I of Kiev as grand prince, and Gertrude (Bolesław's aunt) to power after they had been deposed.

Gytha was married to Vladimir II Monomakh, the prince of Smolensk, a city in what is now western Russia, around 1074 to 1075. Gytha's role in Vladimir's rule is not documented. Vladimir explained in a book of 'Instructions' (Pouchenie) for his sons, written in the twelfth-century: "Love your wives, but grant them no power over you." In his book, Vladimir also mentioned the recent death of Yuri's mother.

Gytha was the mother of Mstislav I, born in Novgorod in 1076 and the last ruler of the united Kievan Rus'. In the Norse sagas, Mstislav is called Harald, after his grandfather. Vladimir conquered Chernigov in 1078 and later moved to his father's city of Pereyaslavl, but the sources do not mention the relationship between Gytha and Vladimir at this point. During her lifetime, Gytha, as Vladimir's spouse, was princess of Smolensk; however, she died before her husband became the grand prince of Kiev in 1113, so she never was grand princess of Kiev.

== Children ==
With Vladimir, Gytha had several children, including:

1. Mstislav the Great (1076–1132)
2. Izyaslav Vladimirovich, Prince of Kursk († 6 September 1096)
3. Svyatoslav Vladimirovich, Prince of Smolensk and Pereyaslav († 16 March 1114)
4. Yaropolk II of Kiev († 18 February 1139)
5. Viacheslav I of Kiev († 2 February 1154)

== Death date ==
There is a problem with establishing Gytha's date of death. It is placed between 1098 and 1107. The patericon of St Pantaleon Cloister in Cologne says that "Gytha the Queen" (Gida regina) died as a nun on 10 March. The year is presumed to be 1098.

According to the "Testament of Vladimir Monomakh", Yuri Dolgorukiy's mother died on 7 May 1107. If Gytha died in 1098 then Yuri could have been a son of his father's second wife Yefimia (whom Vladimir Monomakh in this case supposedly married c. 1099). However, it means there are no mentions in Vladimir Monomakh's works of Gytha's death, despite her being his first wife. Yuri's birth then falls to c. 1099/1100. However, the Primary Chronicle records the first marriage of Yuri - on 12 January 1108. It means that Yuri was born before c. 1099/1100 (as he could not have been 6–9 years old at the time of marriage). Then it means that Gytha could have been Yuri's mother and died in 1107.

== Legacy ==
Through her son Mstislav the Great, she was an ancestor of both Philippa of Hainault and King Edward III of England, hence of all subsequent English and British monarchs. Through Mstislav, she was also an ancestor of Alexander Nevsky, and subsequently ancestor of the first tsar of Russia, Ivan IV the Terrible.

== Family trees ==
- Cnut the Great's family tree

== Sources ==
- Necrologium Sanctis Pantalaeonis Coloniensis, in Rheinische Urbare: Sammlung von Urbaren und anderen Quellen zur rheinischen Wirtschaftsgeschichte (Bonn, 1902), vol. 1.
- Saxo Grammaticus, Gesta Danorum: The History of the Danes, 2 vols. (Oxford, 2015).
- Mason, Emma (2004). The house of Godwine : the history of a dynasty. London: Hambledon and London. ISBN 1-85285-389-1. OCLC 51912953.
- T. Zajac, 'Marriage Impediments in Canon Law and Practice: Consanguinity Regulations and the Case of Orthodox-Catholic Intermarriage in Kyivan Rus, ca. 1000 – 1250,' in Proceedings of the Fourteenth International Congress of Medieval Canon Law, Toronto, 5–11 August 2012, ed. Joseph Goering, Stephan Dusil, and Andreas Thier (Vatican City, 2016), pp. 711–29.
- T. Zajac, 'The social-political roles of the princess in Kyivan Rus', ca. 945–1240,’ in E. Woodacre, ed., A Global Companion to Queenship (Leeds, 2018), pp. 125–146.
