= Girth =

Girth may refer to:

== Mathematics ==
- Girth (functional analysis), the length of the shortest centrally symmetric simple closed curve on the unit sphere of a Banach space
- Girth (geometry), the perimeter of a parallel projection of a shape
- Girth (graph theory), the length of a shortest cycle contained in a graph
- Matroid girth, the size of the smallest circuit in a matroid

== Music and entertainment ==
- Girth (album), 1997 album by heavy metal band Winters Bane
- Girth (Pushing Daisies), an episode of the TV show Pushing Daisies
- Girth (song), the former name of the Guns N' Roses song "Coma"

== Other ==
- Girth (tack), a piece of equipment used to keep a saddle in place on a horse
- Girth (tree), measurement of the circumference of a tree trunk above its base
