= Bleadon =

Village and civil parish in Somerset, England

Coordinates: 51.3082°N 2.9448°W

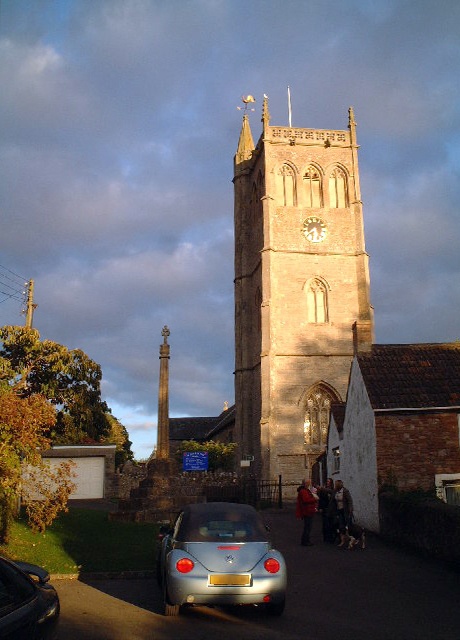
- Church of St Peter and St Paul

- Location within Somerset
- Population: 1,149
- OS grid reference: ST341570
- Unitary authority: North Somerset
- Ceremonial county: Somerset
- Region: South West
- Country: England
- Sovereign state: United Kingdom
- Post town: Weston-super-Mare
- Postcode district: BS24
- Dialling code: 01934
- Police: Avon and Somerset
- Fire: Avon
- Ambulance: South Western
- UK Parliament: Weston-super-Mare

Bleadon is a village and civil parish in Somerset, England. It is about 4 miles (6.4 km) south of Weston-super-Mare and, according to the 2021 census, has a population of 1,149.

== History ==
Bleadon was listed in the Domesday Book of 1086 as Bledone, meaning 'coloured or variegated hill', from Old English blēo 'colour' and dūn 'hill, mountain'. The parish was part of the Winterstoke Hundred.

Just to the north of the village is Bleadon Hill, a 13.52 hectare geological Site of Special Scientific Interest.

There is evidence of agricultural use of the land in the medieval period and probably from at least the Bronze Age.

The village cross and well are listed buildings.

Bleadon lies on the River Axe and had been a small port, sometimes known as Lympsham Wharf, for many years, with the arrival of the railway in 1841 making this the furthest navigable point. It was last used, by the ketch Democrat, in 1942. The Axe Drainage Act of 1915 authorised the drainage of the river and installation of a flood gate at Bleadon, although attempts to control the water had occurred on Bleadon Level since medieval times, including an early windmill, in 1613, to pump water into the sea from behind a sea wall.

=== Battle of Bleadon ===
Following the Norman Conquest in 1066, the sons of the King Harold Godwinson, Godwin, Edmund and perhaps Magnus, took refuge in Ireland, where they enlisted the support of Diarmait mac Máel na mBó, King of Leinster. Supplied with men and ships, they returned to the West Country of England, the homelands of the House of Godwin, in the summer of 1068. However, the citizens of Bristol remained loyal to King William the Conqueror and closed their gates to the rebels. Moving into Somerset, they were opposed by a force led by the English earl Eadnoth the Staller. The two armies met at Bleadon and although Eadnoth was killed in the action, Harold's sons were defeated and returned to Ireland.

== Governance ==
The parish council has responsibility for local issues, including setting an annual precept (local rate) to cover the council’s operating costs and producing annual accounts for public scrutiny. The parish council evaluates local planning applications and works with the local police, district council officers, and neighbourhood watch groups on matters of crime, security, and traffic. The parish council's role also includes initiating projects for the maintenance and repair of parish facilities, such as the village hall or community centre, playing fields and playgrounds, as well as consulting with the district council on the maintenance, repair, and improvement of highways, drainage, footpaths, public transport, and street cleaning. Conservation matters (including trees and listed buildings) and environmental issues are also of interest to the council.

The parish falls within the unitary authority of North Somerset which was created in 1996, as established by the Local Government Act 1992. It provides a single tier of local government with responsibility for almost all local government functions within its area including local planning and building control, local roads, council housing, environmental health, markets and fairs, refuse collection, recycling, cemeteries, crematoria, leisure services, parks, and tourism. It is also responsible for education, social services, libraries, main roads, public transport, trading standards, waste disposal and strategic planning, although fire, police and ambulance services are provided jointly with other authorities through the Avon Fire and Rescue Service, Avon and Somerset Constabulary and the South Western Ambulance Service.

North Somerset's area covers part of the ceremonial county of Somerset but it is administered independently of the non-metropolitan county. Its administrative headquarters is in the town hall in Weston-super-Mare. Between 1 April 1974 and 1 April 1996, it was the Woodspring district of the county of Avon. Before 1974 that the parish was part of the Axbridge Rural District.

The parish is represented in the House of Commons of the Parliament of the United Kingdom as part of the Weston-super-Mare county constituency. It elects one Member of Parliament (MP) by the first past the post system of election. It was also part of the South West England constituency of the European Parliament, prior to Britain leaving the European Union in January 2020, which elected seven MEPs using the d'Hondt method of party-list proportional representation.

== Church ==
The Church of St Peter and St Paul dominates the village. Although parts of the present building seem to date from the 14th century (re-dedicated in 1317), most of the standing fabric is 15th century. However, as Bleadon was an important manor of the Bishops of Winchester from the 10th century, there would certainly have been a church on the same site by the year 1000 at the latest. The building was restored and the chancel shortened in the mid 19th century. It is a Grade I listed building. The tower contains five bells dating from 1711 and made by Edward Bilbie of the Bilbie family.
