= Brian of Brittany =

11th-century Breton noble who became an earl in England

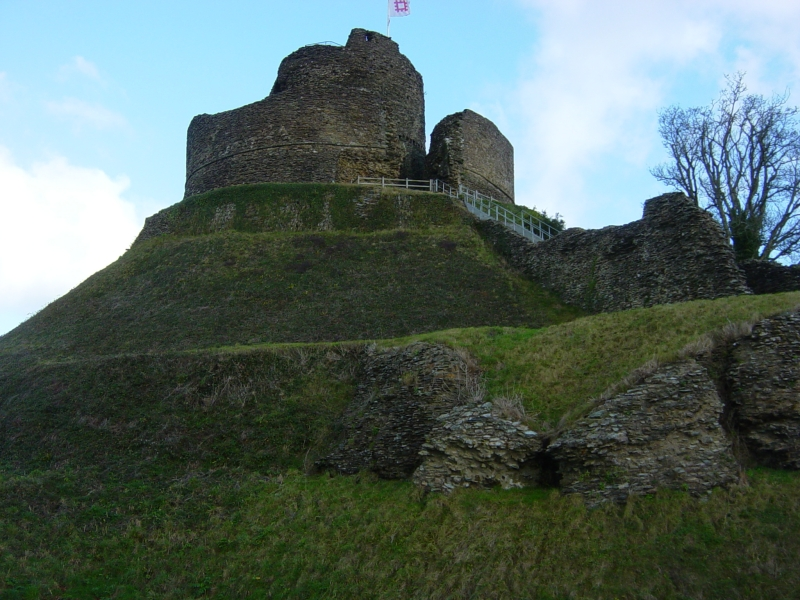
The motte at Launceston Castle

Brian of Brittany (c. 1042 – 14 February, perhaps bef. 1086) was a Breton nobleman who fought in the service of William I of England. A powerful magnate in south-western England, he was the first post-Conquest earl of Cornwall.

Brian was born in about 1042, a son of Odo, Count of Penthièvre. (Note: It is believed that he was an illegitimate son and among Odo's offspring, the third son.) Brian joined in the Norman Conquest of England, along with his brothers Alan the Black (Alain le Noir), and Alan the Red.

Godwine and Edmund, sons of Harold Godwinson, escaped after the Battle of Hastings to Leinster, where they were guests of King Diarmait. In 1068 and 1069 Diarmait lent them the fleet of Dublin for attempted invasions of England. At midsummer (perhaps 26 June) in 1069 Brian led a force that defeated Harold's sons at the Battle of Northam in Devon. Later in the same year Brian and William fitzOsbern were sent to relieve sieges at Shrewsbury and Exeter by English forces rebelling against Norman lordship. They were too late to save the former but a sally by the defenders of Exeter drove the English into the path of Brian and William who "punished their audacity with great slaughter".

After defeating Harold's sons, Brian's forces went north to counter the rebellion by Eadric the Wild, while William the Conqueror's army travelled west; the two armies joined and won the Battle of Stafford.

Brian received grants of land in Suffolk and Cornwall, although the first mention of him as Earl of Cornwall was not made until 1140, by his nephew Alan, 1st Earl of Richmond who had been given the same title by King Stephen and may have been trying to improve the legitimacy of his new rank. Brian's name is often associated with the construction of Launceston Castle.

Brian may have left England soon after the battles of 1069, or perhaps following the rebellion of Ralph de Gael in 1075. In any case, his estates became part of the grants made by King William to Robert of Mortain. This, and the expulsion of Ralph de Gael, caused indignation among the Bretons in England, who William attempted to placate by giving Ralph's lands in East Anglia to Brian's brother Alan.

Brian may have lived the rest of his life as a semi-invalid in and near Brittany, staying with his wife. However, The Complete Peerage states that he was among the invaders of southern Italy, and E. A. Freeman has him holding Kastoria in Thessaly for Bohemond I of Antioch until 1083, identifying him with the 'Bryennius' of Books V and VI of Anna Komnene's the Alexiad. In 1084 he witnessed a charter of his eldest brother Geoffrey Boterel in Brittany and another donating property to the abbey of Saint-Florent, Saumur in Anjou in that year. He may have died before 1086.
