= Harold Godwinson =

King of England in 1066

Harold II
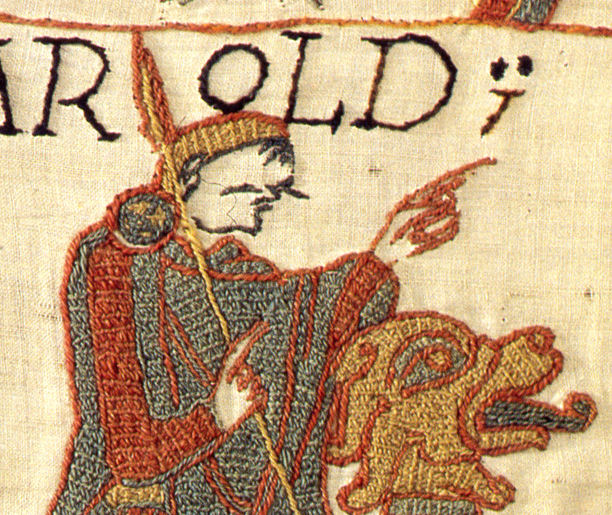
- Harold Godwinson, from the Bayeux Tapestry

King of the English
- Reign: 5 January – 14 October 1066
- Coronation: 6 January 1066
- Predecessor: Edward the Confessor
- Successor: William I
- Born: c. 1022/23; Wessex, England
- Died: 14 October 1066 near Senlac Hill, Sussex, England
- Burial: Waltham Abbey, Essex, or Bosham, Sussex (disputed)
- Spouses: Edith the Fair; Ealdgyth of Mercia
- Issue: Godwin; Edmund; Magnus; Gunhild; Gytha; Harold; Ulf
- House: Godwin
- Father: Godwin, Earl of Wessex
- Mother: Gytha Thorkelsdóttir

Harold Godwinson (c. 1022/23 – 14 October 1066), also called Harold II, was the last crowned Anglo-Saxon king of England. Harold reigned from 6 January 1066 until his death at the Battle of Hastings on 14 October 1066, the decisive battle of the Norman Conquest. He was succeeded by William the Conqueror, the victor at Hastings.

Harold Godwinson was a member of one of the most powerful noble families in England, his father Godwin having been made Earl of Wessex by King Cnut the Great. Harold, who served previously as Earl of East Anglia, was appointed to his father's earldom on Godwin's death. After his brother-in-law, King Edward the Confessor, died childless on 5 January 1066, the Witenagemot convened and chose Harold to succeed him; he was probably the first English monarch to be crowned in Westminster Abbey. In late September, he defeated an invasion by rival claimant Harald Hardrada of Norway in the Battle of Stamford Bridge near York before marching his army back south to meet William at Hastings two weeks later, where he was killed in battle.

== Family background ==
Harold was a son of Godwin (died 1053), the powerful Earl of Wessex, and of Gytha Thorkelsdóttir (c.1010 to after 1068), whose brother Ulf the Earl was married to Estrid Svendsdatter (c. 1015/1016), the daughter of King Sweyn Forkbeard (died 1014) and sister of King Cnut the Great of England and Denmark. Ulf and Estrid's son would become King Sweyn II of Denmark in 1047. Godwin was the son of Wulfnoth, probably a thegn and a native of Sussex. Godwin began his political career by supporting King Edmund Ironside (reigned April to November 1016), but switched to supporting King Cnut by 1018, when Cnut named him Earl of Wessex.

Godwin remained an earl throughout the remainder of Cnut's reign, one of only two earls to survive to the end of that reign. On Cnut's death in 1035, Godwin originally supported Harthacnut instead of Cnut's initial successor Harold Harefoot, but managed to switch sides in 1037 – although not without becoming involved in the 1036 murder of Alfred Aetheling, half-brother of Harthacnut and younger brother of the later King Edward the Confessor.

When Harold Harefoot died in 1040, Harthacnut ascended the English throne and Godwin's power was imperiled by his earlier involvement in Alfred's murder, but an oath and large gift secured the new king's favour for Godwin. Harthacnut's death in 1042 probably involved Godwin in a role as kingmaker, helping to secure the English throne for Edward the Confessor. In 1045, Godwin reached the height of his power when the new king married Godwin's daughter Edith.

Godwin and Gytha had several children – six sons: Sweyn, Harold, Tostig, Gyrth, Leofwine and Wulfnoth (in that order); and three daughters: Edith of Wessex (originally named Gytha but renamed Ealdgyth or Edith when she married King Edward the Confessor), Gunhild and Ælfgifu. The birthdates of the children are unknown. Harold was aged about 25 in 1045, which makes his birth year around 1020.

The manor of Bosham on the South coast of England had been acquired, originally from the Archbishop of Canterbury (Note: Eadsige was Archbishop of Canterbury at the time of Earl Godwine. Eadsige's relations with Christ Church, Canterbury may have been strained, as he seems to have been responsible for the disposal of Canterbury lands to Earl Godwine and his family.) as the family seat by Earl Godwin, and was inherited by Harold. The Bayeux Tapestry has two representations of Harold's family residence. (Note: A team of archaeologists from Newcastle University, and the University of Exeter, claim to have uncovered evidence that a house in Bosham was Harold's family residence as represented on the Bayeux Tapestry.) The manor of Bosham is just one of four places, in England, named on the tapestry.

== Powerful nobleman ==
Edith married Edward on 23 January 1045 and, around that time, Harold became Earl of East Anglia. Harold is called "earl" when he appears as a witness in a will that may date to 1044; but, by 1045, Harold regularly appears as an earl in documents. One reason for his appointment to East Anglia may have been a need to defend against the threat from King Magnus the Good of Norway. It is possible that Harold led some of the ships from his earldom that were sent to Sandwich in 1045 against Magnus. Sweyn, Harold's elder brother, had been named an earl in 1043. It was also around the time that Harold was named an earl that he began a relationship with Edith the Fair, who appears to have been the heiress to lands in Cambridgeshire, Suffolk and Essex, lands in Harold's new earldom. The relationship was a form of marriage that was not blessed or sanctioned by the Church, known as More danico, or "in the Danish manner", and was accepted by most laypeople in England at the time. Any children of such a union were considered legitimate. Harold probably entered the relationship in part to secure support in his new earldom.

Harold's elder brother Sweyn was exiled in 1047 after abducting the abbess of Leominster. Sweyn's lands were divided between Harold and a cousin, Beorn. In 1049, Harold was in command of a ship or ships that were sent with a fleet to aid Henry III, Holy Roman Emperor against Baldwin V, Count of Flanders, who was in revolt against Henry. During this campaign, Sweyn returned to England and attempted to secure a pardon from the king, but Harold and Beorn refused to return any of their lands, and Sweyn, after leaving the royal court, took Beorn hostage and later killed him.

In 1051, Edward appointed an enemy of the Godwins as Archbishop of Canterbury and soon afterwards drove them into exile, but they raised an army which forced the king to restore them to their positions a year later. Earl Godwin died in 1053, and Harold succeeded him as Earl of Wessex, which made him the most powerful lay figure in England after the king.

In 1055, Harold drove back the Welsh, who had burned Hereford. Harold also became Earl of Hereford in 1058, and replaced his late father as the focus of opposition to growing Norman influence in England under the restored monarchy (1042–1066) of Edward the Confessor, who had spent more than 25 years in exile in Normandy. He led a series of successful campaigns (1062–1063) against Gruffudd ap Llywelyn of Gwynedd, king of Wales. This conflict ended following the death of Gruffudd in 1063.

=== In northern France ===
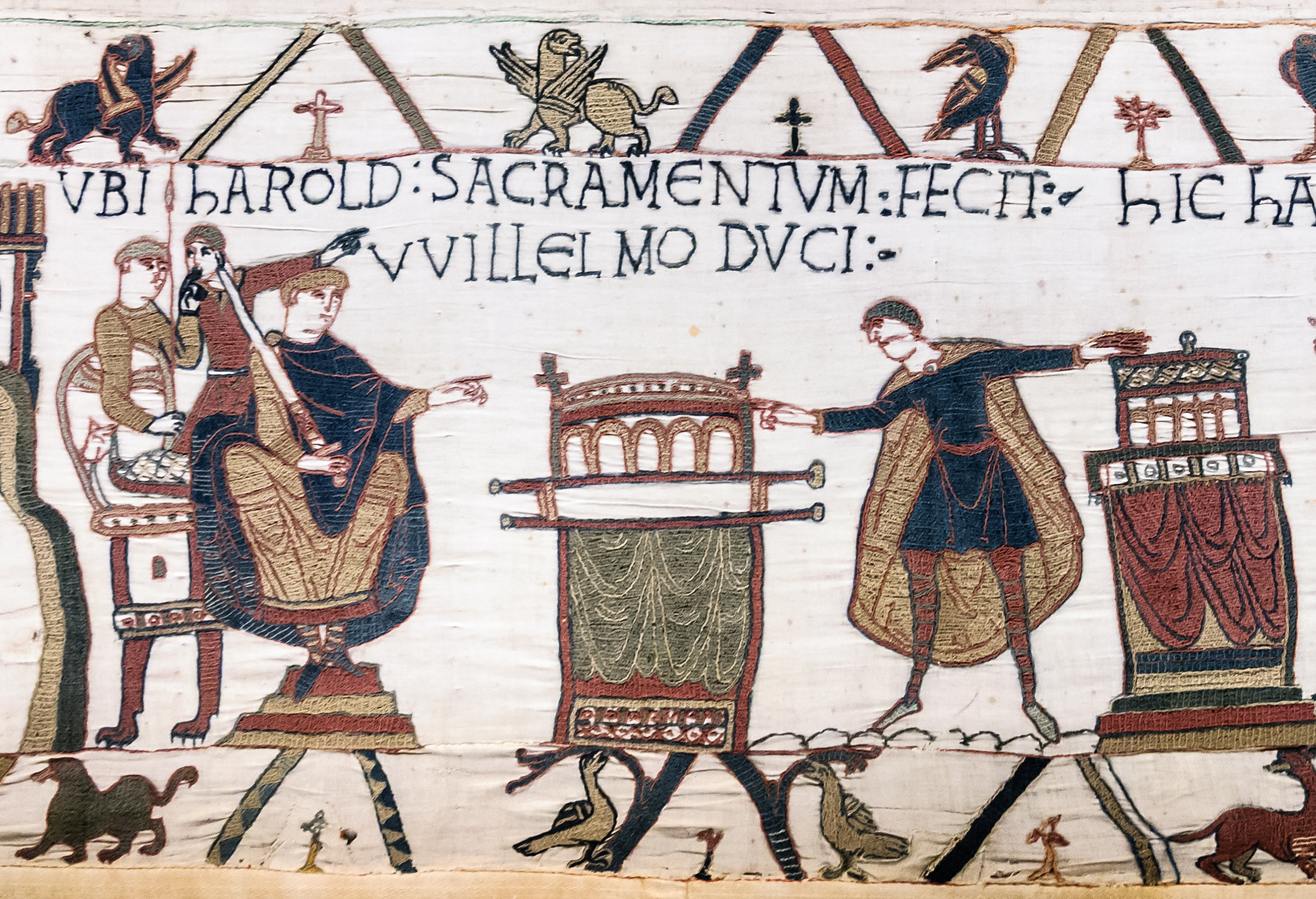
HAROLD SACRAMENTUM FECIT VVILLELMO DUCI ("Harold made an oath to Duke William"): the Bayeux Tapestry shows Harold touching two altars at Bayeux as the duke watches.

In 1064, Harold was apparently shipwrecked at Ponthieu. There is much speculation about this voyage. The earliest post-conquest Norman chroniclers state that King Edward had previously sent Robert of Jumièges, the archbishop of Canterbury, to appoint as his heir Edward's maternal kinsman, Duke William II of Normandy, and that at this later date, Harold was sent to swear fealty. Scholars disagree as to the reliability of this story. William, at least, seems to have believed he had been offered the succession, but some acts of Edward are inconsistent with his having made such a promise, such as his efforts to return his nephew Edward the Exile, son of King Edmund Ironside, from Hungary in 1057. (Note: Edward may not have been blameless in this situation, as at least one other man, Sweyn II of Denmark, also thought Edward had promised him the succession.)

Later Norman chroniclers suggest alternative explanations for Harold's journey: that he was seeking the release of members of his family who had been held hostage since Godwin's exile in 1051, or even that he had simply been travelling along the English coast on a hunting and fishing expedition and had been driven across the English Channel by an unexpected storm. There is general agreement that he left from Bosham, and was blown off course, landing at Ponthieu. He was captured by Count Guy I of Ponthieu, and was then taken as a hostage to the count's castle at Beaurain, (Note: Bayeux Tapestry, in which the place is called in Latin Belrem) 24.5 km (15 1/4 mi) up the River Canche from its mouth at what is now Le Touquet. William arrived soon afterward and ordered Guy to turn Harold over to him.

Harold then apparently accompanied William to battle against William's enemy, Conan II, Duke of Brittany. While crossing into Brittany past the fortified abbey of Mont Saint-Michel, Harold is recorded as rescuing two of William's soldiers from quicksand. They pursued Conan from Dol castle to Rennes, and finally to Dinan, where he surrendered the fortress's keys at the point of a lance. William presented Harold with weapons and arms, knighting him. The Bayeux Tapestry, and other Norman sources, state that Harold then swore an oath on sacred relics to William to support his claim to the English throne. After Edward's death, the Normans were quick to claim that in accepting the crown of England, Harold had broken this alleged oath.

The chronicler Orderic Vitalis wrote of Harold that he "was distinguished by his great size and strength of body, his polished manners, his firmness of mind and command of words, by a ready wit and a variety of excellent qualities. But what availed so many valuable gifts, when good faith, the foundation of all virtues, was wanting?"

Due to a doubling of taxation by Tostig in 1065 that threatened to plunge England into civil war, Harold supported Northumbrian rebels against his brother, and replaced him with Morcar. This led to Harold's marriage alliance with the northern earls but fatally split his own family, driving Tostig into alliance with King Harald Hardrada ("Hard Ruler") of Norway.

== Reign ==
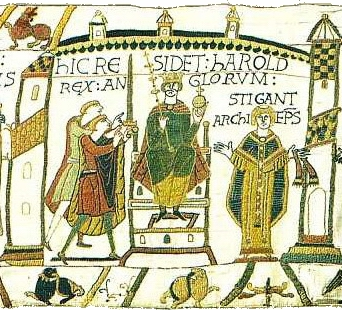
HIC RESIDET HAROLD REX ANGLORUM. STIGANT ARCHIEP[ISCOPU]S. "Here sits Harold King of the English. Archbishop Stigand". Scene immediately after crowning of Harold by (according to the Norman tradition) Archbishop of Canterbury Stigand (d. 1072). Detail from the Bayeux Tapestry.

At the end of 1065, King Edward the Confessor fell into a coma without clarifying his preference for the succession. He died on 5 January 1066, according to the Vita Ædwardi Regis, but not before briefly regaining consciousness and commending his widow and the kingdom to Harold's "protection". The intent of this charge remains ambiguous, as is the Bayeux Tapestry, which simply depicts Edward pointing at a man thought to represent Harold. (Note: Frank Barlow points out that the author of the Vita, who appears to have looked favourably on Harold, was writing after the Conquest and may have been intentionally vague.) When the Witan convened the next day they selected Harold to succeed, (Note: This was in preference to Edward's great-nephew, Edgar the Ætheling, who had yet to reach maturity.) and his coronation followed on 6 January, most likely held in Westminster Abbey, though limited but persuasive evidence from the time survives to confirm this, in the form of its depiction in the Bayeux Tapestry (shown above left). Although later Norman sources point to the suddenness of this coronation, the reason may have been that all the nobles of the land were present at Westminster for the feast of Epiphany, and not because of any usurpation of the throne on Harold's part.

In early January 1066, upon hearing of Harold's coronation, William began plans to invade England, building approximately 700 warships and transports at Dives-sur-Mer on the coast of Normandy. Initially, William struggled to gain support for his cause; however, after claiming that Harold had broken an oath sworn on sacred relics, Pope Alexander II formally declared William the rightful heir of the throne of England and nobles flocked to his cause. In preparation of the invasion, Harold assembled his troops on the Isle of Wight, but the invasion fleet remained in port for almost seven months, perhaps due to unfavourable winds. On 8 September, with provisions running out, Harold disbanded his army and returned to London. On the same day, the invasion force of Harald Hardrada, (Note: Who also claimed the English crown through a succession pact concluded between Harthacnut, king of England and Denmark, and Magnus I of Norway, whereby the kingdoms of the first to die were to pass to the survivor. Magnus had thus gained a claim to Denmark on Harthacnut's death but had not pursued this other crown. Hardrada, uncle and heir of Magnus, now claimed England on this basis.) accompanied by Tostig, landed at the mouth of the Tyne.

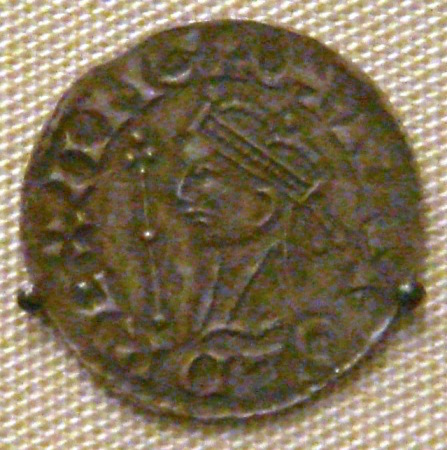
Coin of King Harold Godwinson

The invading forces of Hardrada and Tostig defeated the English earls Edwin of Mercia and Morcar of Northumbria at the Battle of Fulford near York on 20 September 1066. Harold led his army north on a forced march from London, reached Yorkshire in four days, and caught Hardrada by surprise. On 25 September, in the Battle of Stamford Bridge, Harold defeated Hardrada and Tostig, who were both killed.

According to Snorri Sturluson, in a story described by Edward Freeman as "plainly mythical", before the battle a single man rode up alone to Harald Hardrada and Tostig. He gave no name, but spoke to Tostig, offering the return of his earldom if he would turn against Hardrada. Tostig asked what his brother Harold would be willing to give Hardrada for his trouble. The rider replied "Seven feet of English ground, as he is taller than other men." Then he rode back to the English host. Hardrada was impressed by the rider's boldness, and asked Tostig who he was. Tostig replied that the rider was Harold Godwinson himself.

== Battle of Hastings ==
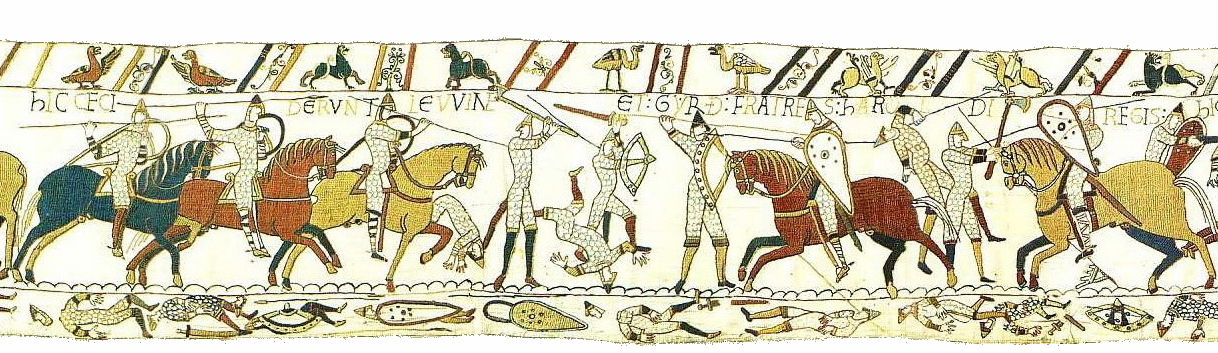
Gyrth and his brother's death at the Battle of Hastings, scene 52 of the Bayeux Tapestry. HIC CECIDERUNT LEVVINE ET GYRÐ FRATRES HAROLDI REGIS (Here have fallen dead Leofwine and Gyrth, brothers of King Harold)

On 12 September 1066, William's fleet sailed from Normandy. Several ships sank in storms, which forced the fleet to take shelter at Saint-Valery-sur-Somme and to wait for the wind to change. On 27 September, the Norman fleet set sail for England, arriving the following day at Pevensey on the coast of East Sussex. Harold's army marched 240 miles (390 kilometres) to intercept William, who had landed perhaps 7,000 men in Sussex, southern England. Harold established his army in hastily built earthworks near Hastings. The two armies clashed at the Battle of Hastings, at Senlac Hill (near the present town of Battle) close by Hastings on 14 October, where after nine hours of hard fighting, Harold was killed and his forces defeated. His brothers Gyrth and Leofwine were also killed in the battle.

=== Death ===
The widely held belief that Harold died by an arrow to the eye is a subject of much scholarly debate. A Norman account of the battle, Carmen de Hastingae Proelio ("Song of the Battle of Hastings"), said to have been written shortly after the battle by Guy, Bishop of Amiens, says that Harold was lanced and his body dismembered by four knights, probably including Duke William. Twelfth-century Anglo-Norman histories, such as William of Malmesbury's Gesta Regum Anglorum and Henry of Huntingdon's Historia Anglorum, recount that Harold died by an arrow wound to his head. An earlier source, Amatus of Montecassino's L'Ystoire de li Normant ("History of the Normans"), written only twenty years after the battle of Hastings, contains a report of Harold being shot in the eye with an arrow, but this may be an early fourteenth-century addition. The sources for how Harold met his death are contradictory, thus modern historians have not been able to produce a definitive story without finding something that will compromise any hypothesis.

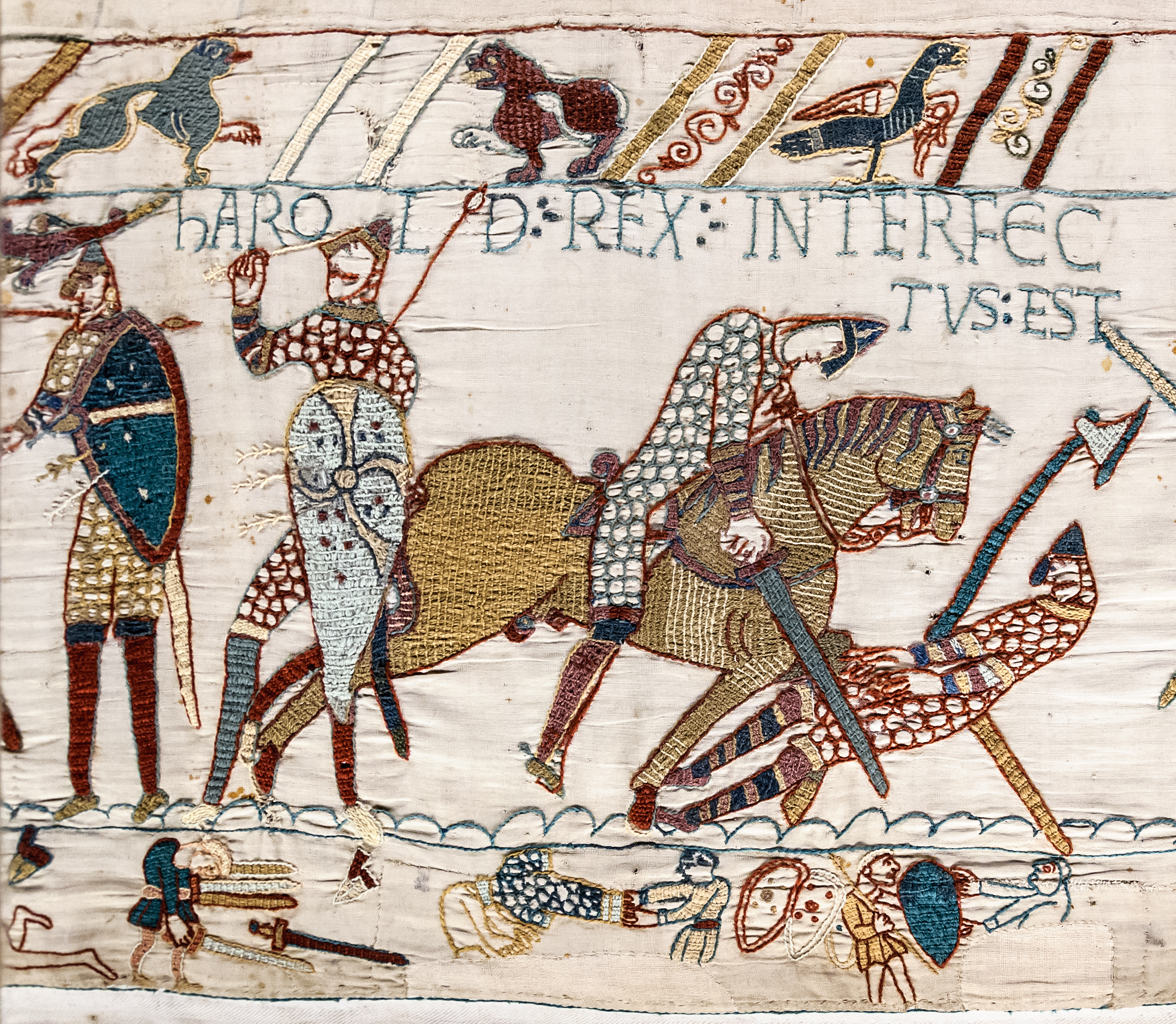
Harold's death depicted in the Bayeux Tapestry, reflecting the tradition that Harold was killed by an arrow in the eye. The annotation above states [Hic] Harold Rex interfectus est, "[Here] King Harold has been killed".

In the panel of the Bayeux Tapestry with the inscription "Hic Harold Rex Interfectus Est" ("Here King Harold is killed") a figure standing below the inscription is currently depicted gripping an arrow that has struck his eye. This, however, may have been a late 18th- or early 19th-century modification to the Tapestry. Some historians have questioned whether this man is intended to be Harold or if the panel shows two instances of Harold in sequence of his death: the figure standing to the left of the central figure commonly thought to be Harold, and then lying to the right, almost supine, being mutilated beneath a horse's hooves. Etchings made of the Tapestry in the 1730s show the standing figure with differing objects. Benoît's 1729 sketch shows only a dotted line indicating stitch marks which is longer than the currently shown arrow and without any indication of fletching, whereas all other arrows in the Tapestry are fletched. Bernard de Montfaucon's 1730 engraving has a solid line resembling a spear being held overhand matching the manner of the standing figure currently depicted with an arrow to the eye; while stitch marks for where such a spear may have been removed can be seen in the Tapestry. In 1816, Charles Stothard was commissioned by the Society of Antiquaries of London to make a copy of the Bayeux Tapestry. He included in his reproduction previously damaged or missing parts of the work with his own hypothesised depictions. This is when the arrow first appears. Stothard's is the first record of the Bayeux Tapestry after it was damaged during the French Revolution and before repairs were carried out in the 19th century. It has been proposed that the supine figure once had an arrow added by over-enthusiastic 19th-century restorers that was later unstitched. Many believe the figure with an arrow in his eye to be Harold as the name "Harold" is above him. This has been disputed by examining other examples from the Tapestry where the visual centre of a scene, not the location of the inscription, identifies named figures. A further suggestion is that both accounts are accurate, and that Harold suffered first the eye wound, then the mutilation, and the Tapestry is depicting both in sequence.

=== Burial ===
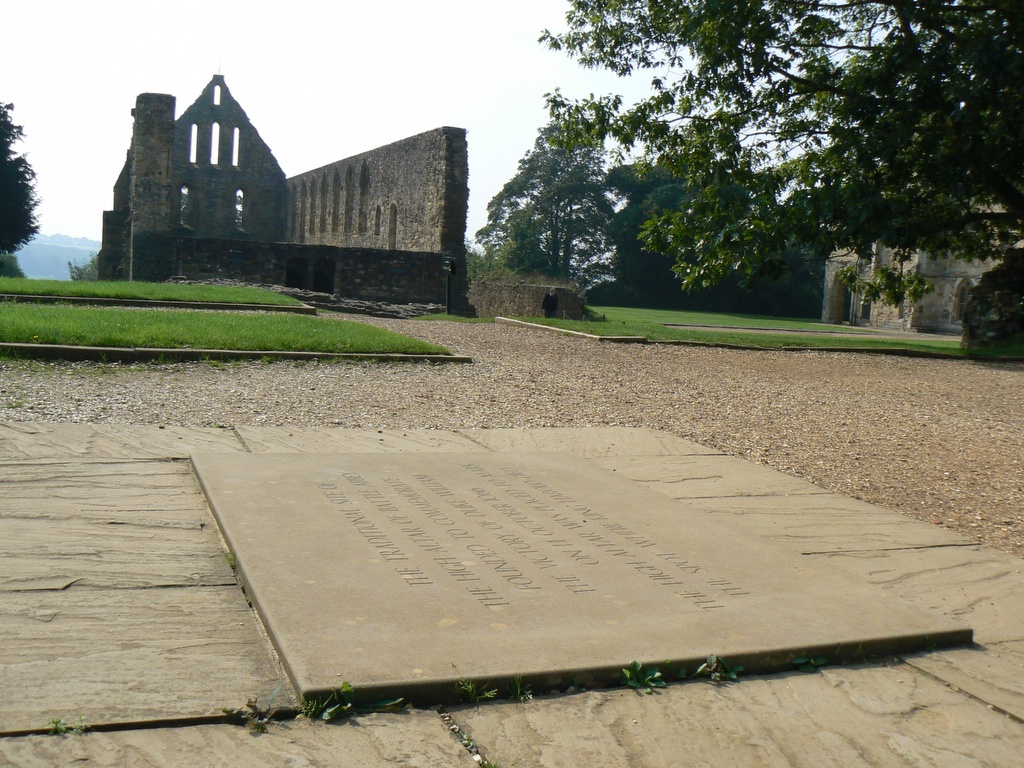
The spot where Harold reportedly died, which became the site of Battle Abbey in East Sussex

The account of the contemporary chronicler William of Poitiers states that the body of Harold was given to William Malet for burial:

The two brothers of the King were found near him and Harold himself, stripped of all badges of honour, could not be identified by his face but only by certain marks on his body. His corpse was brought into the Duke's camp, and William gave it for burial to William, surnamed Malet, and not to Harold's mother, who offered for the body of her beloved son its weight in gold. For the Duke thought it unseemly to receive money for such merchandise, and equally he considered it wrong that Harold should be buried as his mother wished, since so many men lay unburied because of his avarice. They said in jest that he who had guarded the coast with such insensate zeal should be buried by the seashore.

— William of Poitiers, Gesta Guillelmi II Ducis Normannorum, William of Poitiers 1953, p. 229

Another source states that Harold's widow, Edith the Fair, (Note: also known as Edyth Swannesha (Edith Swanneck)) was called to identify the body, which she did by some private mark known only to her. Harold's strong association with Bosham, his birthplace, and the discovery in 1954 of an Anglo-Saxon coffin in the church there, has led some to suggest it as the place of King Harold's burial. A request to exhume a grave in Bosham Church was refused by the Diocese of Chichester in December 2003, the Chancellor having ruled that the chances of establishing the identity of the body as Harold's were too slim to justify disturbing a burial place. The exhumation in 1954 had revealed the remains of a man in a coffin. "[It] was made of Horsham stone, magnificently finished, and contained the thigh and pelvic bones of a powerfully built man of about 5ft 6in (Note: 5.5 feet (1.7 m)) in height, aged over 60 years (Note: Harold was thought to have been in his 40s at his death) and with traces of arthritis." It was suggested that the contents of the coffin had been opened at a much earlier date and vandalised, as the skull was missing and the remaining bones damaged in a way that was inconsistent with decomposition post mortem. The description of the remains is not unlike the fate of the king, recorded in the Carmen de Hastingae Proelio, that says Harold was buried by the sea. The location of the grave, at Bosham Church, is also consistent with William of Poitiers' description as it is only a small distance from Chichester Harbour and in sight of the English Channel. There were legends of Harold's body being given a proper funeral years later in Waltham Abbey Church in Essex, which he had refounded in 1060.

== Legacy ==
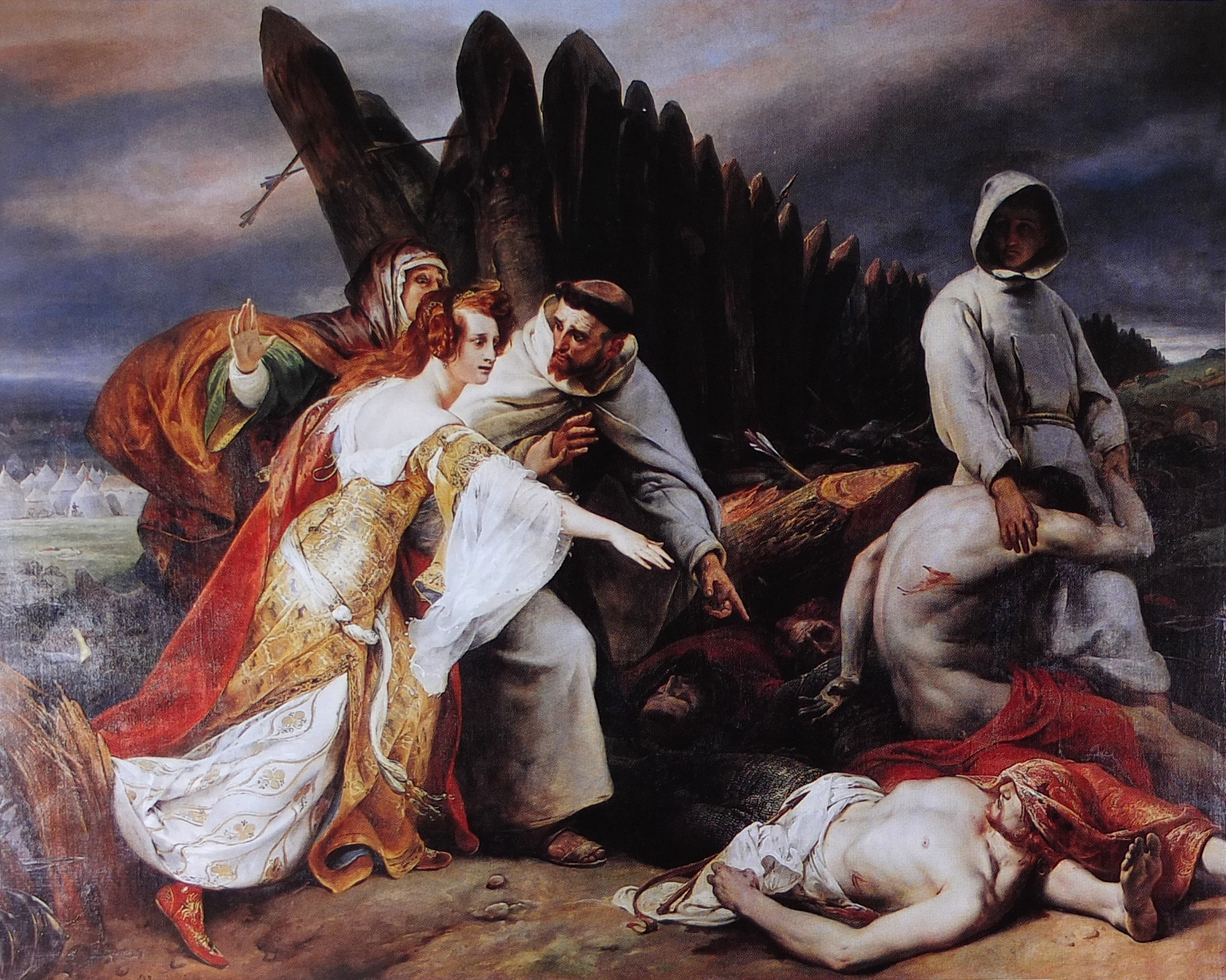
Edith Recovering Harold's Body after the Battle of Hastings (Horace Vernet, 1827)

Several stories, including the Vita Haroldi, suggested that Harold had not died at Hastings, but instead fled England or that he later ended his life as a hermit at Chester or Canterbury.

Harold's son Ulf, along with Morcar and two others, were released from prison by King William as he lay dying in 1087. Ulf threw his lot in with Robert Curthose, who knighted him, and then disappeared from history. Two of Harold's other sons, Godwine and Edmund, invaded England in 1068 and 1069 with the aid of Diarmait mac Máel na mBó (High King of Ireland) but were defeated at the Battle of Northam in Devon in 1069. (Note: At midsummer in 1069, Brian of Brittany and Alan the Black led a force that defeated a raid by Godwine and Edmund, sons of Harold Godwinson, who had sailed from Ireland with a fleet of 64 ships to the mouth of the River Taw in Devon. They had escaped to Leinster after the Battle of Hastings in 1066 where they were hosted by Diarmait. In 1068 and 1069, Diarmait lent them the fleet of Dublin for their attempted invasions of England.) In 1068, Diarmait presented another Irish king with Harold's battle standard.

== Relationships, marriages and children ==
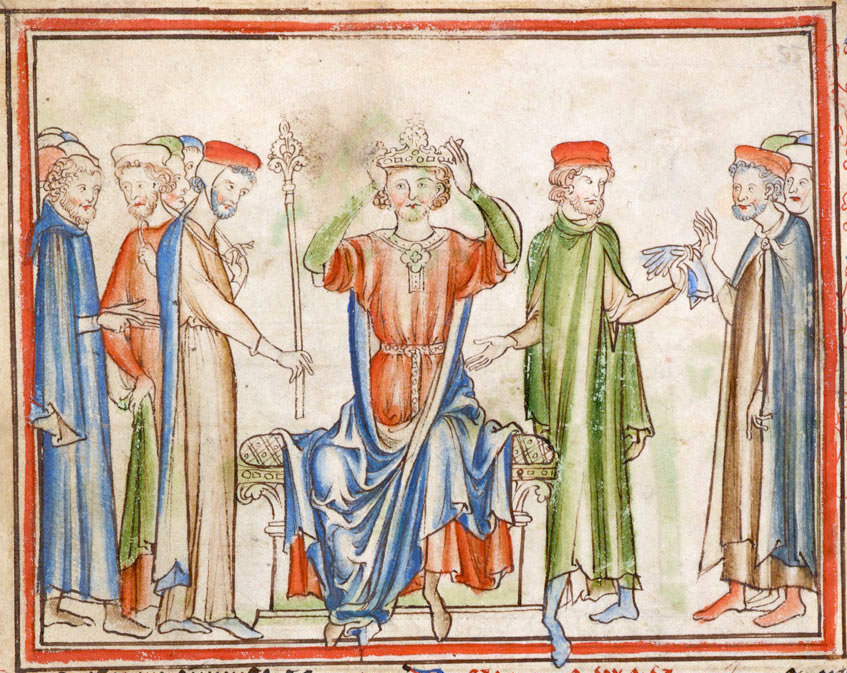
13th-century version of Harold's crowning, from an anonymous Life of King Edward the Confessor in Cambridge University Library

Harold was in a more danico marriage (Note: The pagan English had been polygynous. When the English were evangelised, although by church law concubinage would not have been legally ratified, it was largely acknowledged by custom. Edith's marriage was described as more danico (in the Danish fashion) which means unblessed by the church.) with Edith the Fair for approximately twenty years and had at least five children with her.

There is a tradition that Edith the Fair took the broken body of her husband Harold Godwinson to the Church at Waltham Holy Cross to be buried. What happened to her after 1066 is not known. Also, after their defeat at the Battle of Northam the fate of the sons is unclear although some later sources suggest they took refuge at the Danish court with their grandmother, aunt and sister.

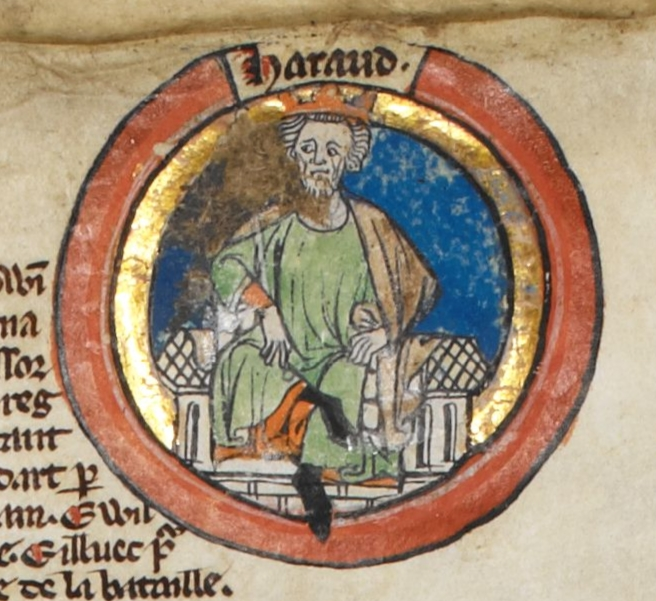
Harold II Godwinson depicted in a 14th century genealogy of monarchs.

In about January 1066, Harold married Ealdgyth, daughter of Earl Ælfgar, and widow of the Welsh prince Gruffydd ap Llywelyn. After her husband's death at the Battle of Hastings, the pregnant Ealdgyth had been collected from London by her brothers, the Northern earls Edwin of Mercia and Morcar of Northumbria, and taken to Chester for safety. It is not known what happened to her thereafter.

Some historians have suggested that Harold and Ealdgyth's union was childless, others ascribe two children to Ealdgyth, named Harold and Wulf/Ulf. Because of the chronology it is likely that the boys would have been twins and born after the demise of their father. Another possibility is that Ulf was the son of Edith the Fair.

Family of Harold Godwinson

Godwin of Wessex	Gytha; Thorkelsdóttir	Earl Ulf	Estrid	Cnut the Great
Sweyn	Edyth; Swannesha	Harold; Godwinson	Ealdgyth of Mercia	Gruffydd ap Llywelyn	Tostig	Gyrth	Leofwine	Wulfnoth	Edith	Edward the Confessor
Godwin	Edmund	Magnus	Gytha	Gunhild	Ulf	Harold

According to Orderic Vitalis, Harold was at some time betrothed to Adeliza, a daughter of William the Conqueror; if so, the betrothal never led to marriage.

Harold Godwinson House of Godwin Died: 14 October 1066
Regnal titles
Preceded by Edward the Confessor	King of the English; 1066	Succeeded by William I
Peerage of England
Preceded by Ælfgār	Earl of East Anglia; 1052–1053	Succeeded by Ælfgār
Preceded by Godwin	Earl of Wessex; 1st creation 1053–1066	Merged in Crown
