= Eadnoth the Constable =

Anglo-Saxon landowner and steward

- Staller
- Born: Unknown; Unknown
- Died: 1068; Bleadon
- Issue: Harding (son); Robert Fitzharding (grandson)
- Occupation: landowner, steward

Eadnoth the Constable (died 1068) also known as Eadnoth the Staller, was an Anglo-Saxon landowner and steward to kings Edward the Confessor and Harold Godwinson. He is mentioned in the Domesday Book as holding thirty manors in Devon, Dorset, Somerset, and Wiltshire, before the Norman conquest. He may have been the same man as Eadnoth of Ugford, also known as Alnoth. Eadnoth was killed at Bleadon in 1068, leading a force against the two sons of Harold II, who had invaded Somerset. His son Harding became Sheriff of Bristol, and one of his grandsons was Robert Fitzharding, the ancestor of the Berkeley family of Berkeley Castle.
