= Edith the Fair =

11th-century consort of King Harold Godwinson

Edith the Fair (Old English: Ealdgȳð Swann hnesce, "Edyth the Gentle Swan"; c. 1025 – c. 1086), also known as Edith Swanneck, (Note: Her first name is also spelled Ealdgyth, Aldgyth, Edeva or Eddeva, and sometimes appears as Ēadgȳð and Ēadgifu. (Compare Godgifu which was modified to Godiva in Latin texts.)) was one of the wealthiest magnates in England on the eve of the Norman Conquest and may also have been the first wife of King Harold Godwinson. "Swanneck" (or Swan-Neck) comes from the folk etymology that made of her name, Swann Hnecca in Old English, "Swan Neck". The formula was actually most likely a corrupted form of Swann Hnesce, "Gentle Swan".

== Early life ==
Edith was born circa 1025, and is thought by some to have been a daughter of Thorkell the Tall and his wife, a daughter of Ethelred the Unready.

== Marriage ==
Edith may have been the mother of Harold's daughter Gunhild of Wessex, who became the mistress of Alan Rufus, and Gytha of Wessex, who was taken by her grandmother to Denmark in 1068. Gytha was addressed as "princess" and married Grand Prince of Kiev Vladimir II Monomakh.

Though Harold is said to have lawfully married Ealdgyth, who was the daughter of Earl Ælfgar and the widow of the Welsh ruler Gruffydd ap Llywelyn, the marriage in spring 1066 is seen by most modern scholars as one of political convenience. Mercia and Wales were allies against England, and the marriage gave the English claims in two very troublesome areas, also gave Harold Godwinson a marriage deemed "legitimate" by the clergy, unlike his long-time common-law marriage with Edith the Fair.

== Folklore ==
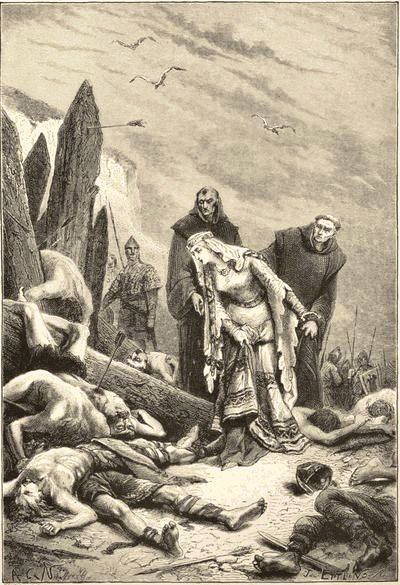
Edith identifies Harold's body (from François Guizot's History of France)

According to folklore, Edith identified Harold's mutilated body after his loss to William the Conqueror at the Battle of Hastings. Despite pleas by Harold's mother, Gytha Thorkelsdóttir, for William to surrender Harold's body for burial, the Norman army refused even though Gytha offered Harold's weight in gold. It was then that Edith the Fair walked through the carnage of the battle so that she might identify Harold by markings on his chest, known only to her. It was because of Edith the Fair's identification of the body that Harold was given a Christian burial by the monks at Waltham Abbey.

== Sources ==
- A History of Britain: At the Edge of the World, 3500 BC - 1603 AD by Simon Schama, BBC/Miramax, 2000 ISBN 0-7868-6675-6
- The German Classics of the Nineteenth and Twentieth Centuries, Volume 06: Masterpieces of German Literature Translated into English in Twenty Volumes by Kuno Francke www.gutenberg.org/ebooks/12473
- Great Tales from English History: The Truth About King Arthur, Lady Godiva, Richard the Lionheart, and More by Robert Lacey, 2004 ISBN 0-316-10910-X
- House of Godwine: The History of Dynasty by Emma Mason, 2004 ISBN 1-85285-389-1
- Ancestral Roots of Certain American Colonists Who Came to America Before 1700 by Frederick Lewis Weis, Lines: 176–2, 176A-4, 177–1
- 'Who Was Eddeva?' by J.R. Boyle, F.S.A.; Transactions of East Riding Antiquarian Society, Volume 4 (1896); pages 11–22
