= Edmund Ætheling =

Son of King Edmund Ironside (died before 1057)

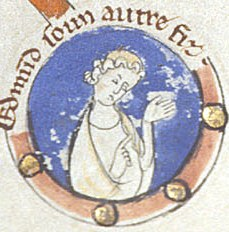
- Edmund in the late 13th century Genealogical chronicle of the English Kings
- Born: 1016 or 1017; England
- Died: Before 1057; Hungary
- House: Wessex
- Father: Edmund Ironside
- Mother: Ealdgyth

Edmund Ætheling (Note: This article is about the son of Edmund Ironside, but "ætheling" means son of a king and other Edmunds were called "Ætheling", or occasionally "the Ætheling", including Æthelred the Unready's brother Edmund, who died young. Edmund Ironside and his great-grandfather Edmund I were æthelings before they became kings.) (born 1016 or 1017, died before 1057) was a son of Edmund Ironside and his wife Ealdgyth. Edmund Ironside briefly ruled as king of England following the death of his father Æthelred the Unready in April 1016. Edmund Ironside died in late 1016 after a hard-fought war with Danish invader Cnut, who became king of all England shortly after.

The following year, Cnut sent Edmund Ironside's two infant sons, Edmund Ætheling and Edward the Exile, to the Continent, probably to King Olof Skötkonung of Sweden, to be murdered. Instead, the princes were spared and sent to Hungary, possibly after a sojourn at the court of Grand Prince Yaroslav I of Kiev. Edmund may have married a daughter of the Hungarian king, and died in Hungary on 10 January in an unknown year before 1057.

== Background ==
England suffered from Viking attacks from the late eighth century, but they ceased for around twenty-five years from the mid-950s. Raids in the 980s were followed by large-scale Danish invasions from the 990s, and English resistance under King Æthelred the Unready was ineffectual, resulting in the conquest of England by Swein Forkbeard in December 1013. He died the following February, and Æthelred drove Swein's son Cnut out of England. In 1015 Æthelred's favourite, Eadric Streona, the ealdorman of Mercia, murdered two leading thegns of the northern Danelaw, (Note: Thegns were the third level of the aristocracy below kings and ealdormen (later called earls). The Danelaw was the area in eastern and northern England formerly ruled by Danish Vikings and which was allowed by Anglo-Saxon kings to keep its customary Scandinavian laws.) Morcar and his brother Sigeferth. Æthelred then took possession of their lands and had Sigeferth's widow, who was almost certainly called Ealdgyth, (Note: She is almost always named by historians as Ealdgyth, but her name is first recorded by John of Worcester in the twelfth century. The historian Ann Williams points out that Morcar's wife was also called Ealdgyth. Williams argues that while it is possible that the brothers both married a woman called Ealdgyth, which was a common name, it is also possible that John mistakenly gave Sigeferth's wife (who married Edmund after her first husband's death) the name of her sister-in-law.) imprisoned at Malmesbury. Morcar and Sigeferth had been important allies of Æthelred's son and heir, Edmund Ironside, and he responded by seizing their lands, marrying Ealdgyth in defiance of his father, and receiving the submission of the people of the Five Boroughs of the Danelaw. At the same time Cnut returned to England with an army, aiming at conquest. Æthelred died in April 1016 and was succeeded by Edmund, who carried on the fight. Following a defeat in October he agreed to divide the kingdom with Cnut, but he died on 30 November and Cnut became undisputed king of England.

== Birth ==
Edmund and his brother Edward were the sons of Edmund Ironside by Ealdgyth. Their marriage took place in the late summer of 1015, so their sons were born in 1016 or 1017. As the marriage lasted no more than fifteen months, either the boys were twins or one of them was born after his father's death. They were æthelings, an Old English word meaning "king's son" or "prince", but their father's death and Cnut's seizure of the throne deprived them of a realistic prospect of succeeding to the kingship. The twelfth-century historian William of Malmesbury states that Edmund, who he misnamed Eadwig, was the elder brother.

== Life in exile ==
In his article on Edward in the Oxford Dictionary of National Biography, M. K. Lawson described the sources as "thoroughly unsatisfactory". It is known that the brothers were sent to the Continent as infants and remained there all their lives, apart from Edward's return to England a few days before his death in 1057. He is commonly known as 'Edward the Exile'. According to the twelfth-century chronicler John of Worcester, in 1017 Eadric Streona urged Cnut:

to kill the little æthelings, Edward and Edmund, sons of King Edmund, but because it would seem as a great disgrace to him if they perished in England, when a short time had passed, he sent them to the king of Sweden to be killed. He, although there was a treaty between them, would in no wise comply with his entreaties, but sent them to the king of Hungary ... to be reared and kept alive. One of them, namely Edmund, with the passage of time, ended his life there.

A late eleventh-century entry in manuscript D of the Anglo-Saxon Chronicle says that Cnut sent Edward to Hungary "to betray". The historian Nicholas Hooper regards the statement that he went directly from England to Hungary as "oversimplified", and the entry does not mention Edmund. Other sources suggest that they spent part of their exile at the court of Yaroslav I, prince in Kiev (then the capital of Kievan Rus'). The historian and genealogist Szabolcs de Vajay argues that later writers such as John of Worcester, who say that the brothers were sent directly to Hungary from Sweden, are wrong. He cites the Leges Edwardi Confessoris, which states that they were received by Yaroslav, and the late eleventh-century German chronicler Adam of Bremen, who says that they were "condemned to exile in Russia", as early sources which say that they first went to Russia. However, the Leges is not an early source; it dates to the 1140s, contemporary with John of Worcester's Chronicle. De Vajay suggests that the brothers stayed in Sweden until 1028. In that year, King Olaf of Norway fled to Sweden and then Kiev after being defeated by Cnut and losing his kingdom, and de Vajay thinks that Edmund and Edward accompanied him. A claimant to the Hungarian kingship, Andrew, fled to Russia after being expelled from his home country, and in 1046 he returned and seized the throne. De Vajay further suggests that Edmund and Edward ended up in Hungary because they joined Andrew's expedition.

Geffrei Gaimar, writing in the 1130s, blames Emma, who was wife successively to Æthelred and Cnut, for the princes' exile. Gaimar claims that Emma urged Cnut to send the infants away because they were the true heirs to the kingdom, and might therefore cause unrest. They were sent to a powerful man called Walgar in Denmark, and when they reached twelve years old the English wanted them as rulers, and so Emma urged Cnut to have them maimed. She claimed that they were a threat to Cnut, but her real purpose was to secure the succession for her children by Æthelred. Walgar was not willing to harm the boys, so he fled with them to Gardimbre (perhaps Russia (Note: Gardimbre may be a corruption of the Scandinavian term for Russia, Garðaríki, the land of towns.)) and then on to Hungary. Gaimar's account is described by the historian Simon Keynes as "elaborate, confused and (one suspects) largely fanciful", while Frank Barlow comments that "because of the twelfth-century Gaimar's inventions in his Lestoire des Engleis, some very strange accounts of Æthelred's descendants are in circulation". (Note: Barlow cites Gabriel Ronay's 1989 book, The Lost King of England: The East European Adventures of Edward the Exile (Woodbridge, UK: Boydell and Brewer ISBN 978-0-85115-785-6) as an example of the "strange accounts", and the scholars Rodney Thomson and Michael Winterbottom describe The Lost King as "utterly unreliable".) Keynes concludes "by the admittedly dangerous process of conflation", that Edmund and Edward probably went first to Sweden, then Russia and finally to the Hungarian court.

According to the twelfth-century writer Aelred of Rievaulx, Edmund married a daughter of the king of Hungary. Keynes comments that Aelred is a credible source as he spent several years at the court of King David I of Scotland, who was a grandson of Edward the Exile.

== Death ==
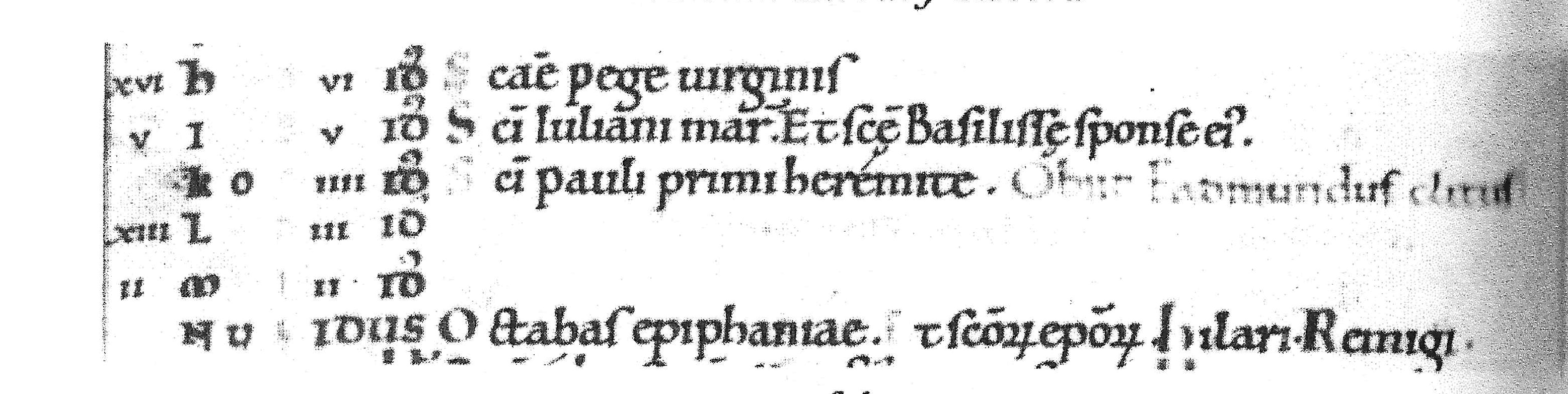
Obit for Edmund Ætheling in Bodleian Manuscript Douce 296

Aelred states that Edmund died soon after his marriage, and John of Worcester writes that he died in Hungary. Bodleian MS Douce 296, a psalter which dates to the middle of the eleventh century, provides further information. It includes a calendar of saints' feast days, and later in the century obits (death dates) of Edmund and Edward were added to the calendar. Edmund's reads "10 January: Obiit Edmundus clitus". Clitus is the Latin for ætheling. The date of Edmund's death is thus known, but not the year. He was probably dead by 1054, when Edward the Confessor despatched Ealdred, Bishop of Worcester, to the Continent to seek the return of Edward the Exile to England, and certainly by 1057, when his brother Edward died a few days after his return.

== Bibliography ==
- Barlow, Frank (1997). Edward the Confessor (New ed.). New Haven, Connecticut: Yale University Press. ISBN 978-0-300-07208-2.
- Barlow, Frank (2002). The Godwins:The Rise and Fall of a Noble Dynasty. London, UK: Pearson Longman. ISBN 978-0-582-78440-6.
- Darlington, Reginald; McGurk, Patrick, eds. (1995). The Chronicle of John of Worcester (in Latin and English). Vol. 2. Oxford, UK: Clarendon Press. ISBN 978-0-19-822261-3.
- de Vajay, Szabolcs (1962). "Agatha, mother of Saint Margaret Queen of Scotland". Duquesne Review. viii (2): 71–87. ISSN 0012-7205.
- Higham, Nicholas (2014). "Danelaw". In Lapidge, Michael; Blair, John; Keynes, Simon; Scragg, Donald (eds.). The Wiley Blackwell Encyclopedia of Anglo-Saxon England (2nd ed.). Chichester, West Sussex: Wiley Blackwell. pp. 139–140. ISBN 978-0-470-65632-7.
- Hooper, Nicholas (1985). "Edgar the Ætheling: Anglo-Saxon Prince, Rebel and Crusader". Anglo-Saxon England. 14: 197–213. doi:10.1017/S0263675100001344. ISSN 0263-6751.
- Keynes, Simon (1985). "The Crowland Psalter and the Sons of King Edmund Ironside". Bodleian Library Record. 11 (1): 359–370. doi:10.3828/blr.1985.11.6.359. ISSN 0067-9488.
- Keynes, Simon (2004). "Æthelred II [Ethelred; known as Ethelred the Unready] (c. 966x8–1016)". Oxford Dictionary of National Biography. Oxford University Press. doi:10.1093/ref:odnb/8915. ISBN 978-0-19-861412-8. (subscription, Wikipedia Library access or UK public library membership required)
- Keynes, Simon (2014a). "Edmund Ironside". In Lapidge, Michael; Blair, John; Keynes, Simon; Scragg, Donald (eds.). The Wiley Blackwell Encyclopedia of Anglo-Saxon England (2nd ed.). Chichester, West Sussex: Wiley Blackwell. p. 165. ISBN 978-0-470-65632-7.
- Keynes, Simon (2014b). "Thegn". In Lapidge, Michael; Blair, John; Keynes, Simon; Scragg, Donald (eds.). The Wiley Blackwell Encyclopedia of Anglo-Saxon England (2nd ed.). Chichester, West Sussex: Wiley Blackwell. pp. 459–461. ISBN 978-0-470-65632-7.
- Lawson, M. K. (2004a). "Edmund II [known as Edmund Ironside] (d. 1016), king of England". Oxford Dictionary of National Biography. Oxford University Press. doi:10.1093/ref:odnb/8502. (subscription, Wikipedia Library access or UK public library membership required)
- Lawson, M.K. (2004b). "Edward Ætheling [called Edward the Exile] (d. 1057)". Oxford Dictionary of National Biography. Oxford University Press. doi:10.1093/ref:odnb/37387. (subscription, Wikipedia Library access or UK public library membership required)
- Mason, Emma (2004). The House of Godwine: The History of a Dynasty. London, UK: Hambledon and London. ISBN 978-1-85285-389-1.
- Mynors, R. A. B.; Thomson, R. M.; Winterbottom, M., eds. (1998). William of Malmesbury: Gesta Regum Anglorum, The History of the English Kings (in Latin and English). Vol. I. Oxford, UK: Clarendon Press. ISBN 978-0-19-820678-1.
- Ronay, Gabriel (1984). "Edward Aetheling: Anglo-Saxon England's Last Hope". History Today. 34 (1): 43–51. ISSN 0018-2753.
- Stenton, Frank (1971). Anglo-Saxon England (3rd ed.). Oxford, UK: Oxford University Press. ISBN 978-0-19-280139-5.
- Swanton, Michael, ed. (2000). The Anglo-Saxon Chronicles (revised paperback ed.). London, UK: Phoenix. ISBN 978-1-84212-003-3.
- Thomson, Rodney; Winterbottom, Michael (1999). William of Malmesbury: Gesta Regum Anglorum, The History of the English Kings. General Introduction and Commentary. Vol. II. Oxford, UK: Clarendon Press. ISBN 978-0-19-820682-8.
- Williams, Ann (2003). Æthelred the Unready: The Ill-Counselled King. London, UK: Hambledon and London. ISBN 978-1-85285-382-2.
- Wormald, Patrick (1999). The Making of English Law: King Alfred to the Twelfth Century. Vol. 1. Oxford, UK: Blackwell. ISBN 978-0-631-13496-1.
