= Battle of Brentford (1016) =

Battle fought in 1016 between the English and the Danes

Coordinates: 51°28′43″N 0°18′25″W

- Part of Cnut's invasion of England
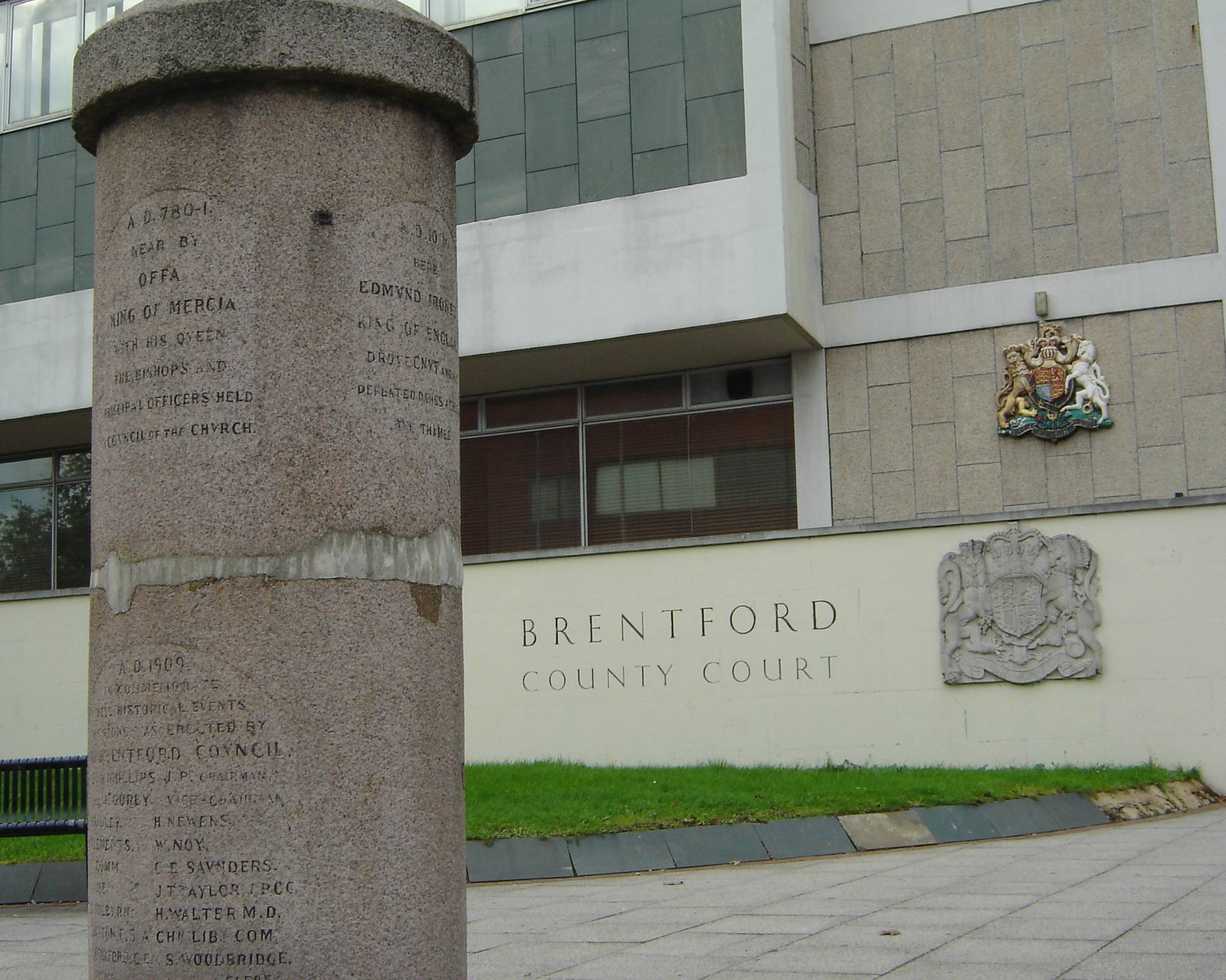
- A monument commemorating this and other battles in Brentford
Date	1016
Location	Brentford, Middlesex
Result	Anglo-Saxon victory

Belligerents
Kingdom of England	Kingdom of Denmark

Commanders and leaders
Edmund Ironside	Cnut the Great; Thorkell the Tall; Eadric Streona; Eiríkr Hákonarson

Strength
Unknown	8,000–12,000

Casualties and losses
Heavy losses	Unknown

The Battle of Brentford was fought in 1016 between invading forces of the Kingdom of Denmark under Cnut and the defending forces of the Kingdom of England led by Edmund Ironside. The battle was fought as part of a campaign by Cnut to conquer England. The battle was a victory for the English, who nevertheless lost a large number of men.

Cnut's invasion continued after the battle and a peace was made after Edmund lost the Battle of Assandun (in Essex) later in the year. Under these terms Cnut gained Mercia and payment for his army, while Edmund held Wessex. Cnut would gain the whole of England after Edmund's death on 30 November 1016.

== Background ==
=== Situation in England ===
After a respite from raids that lasted for about the years 900-980, the Vikings began raiding England again. The Danish king Svein raided England in 994, unsuccessfully attempting to besiege London. He returned in 1003 after the St Brice's Day massacre in 1002, when Æthelred, king of England, had many Danes living outside the Danelaw killed. The Viking presence in England continued and in 1013 Svein, accompanied by his younger son Cnut, was accepted as king. Æthelred was forced to flee to Normandy. When Svein died in 1014 he was succeeded by his son Harald as king of Denmark, but his army in England accepted Cnut as king. Æthelred was invited by the English to return and Cnut was driven out of his base at Gainsborough after an English attack found him unprepared.

During this time Eadric Streona, the ealdorman of Mercia, is recorded in the Anglo-Saxon Chronicle as having hindered the efforts of the English to resist the Danish invaders. In 1015 Eadric killed Sigeferth and Morcar, the chief thanes of the Five Boroughs, for unknown reasons, but it would seem that this prompted Edmund Ironside, Æthelred's eldest surviving son, to act to counter Eadric's growing influence. In 1015 Edmund married Sigeferth's widow against the king's wishes, and took possession of the estates of Sigeferth and Morcar in the east midlands.

=== Cnut's invasion ===
Cnut, possibly now claiming the title king of Denmark, appeared at Sandwich in September 1015 and ravaged Dorset, Wiltshire and Somerset. With Æthelred sick, and Edmund at loggerheads with Eadric, Cnut faced little opposition, and by Christmas the people of Wessex had recognised Cnut as king and given him hostages. Edmund had raised an army late in 1015 but withdrew after learning Eadric intended to betray him to the invaders. According to the Anglo-Saxon Chronicle Eadric took 40 ships from the king and defected to Cnut. The first army raised by Edmund in 1016 disbanded after Æthelred did not appear to lead it and the second army failed to achieve much of note. Edmund was then joined by his brother in law, Earl Uhtred of Northumbria, and attacked towns which according to Anglo-Norman chronicler William of Malmesbury, had sided with Cnut. Uhtred was forced to return north when Cnut began raiding his lands around Bamburgh, and was killed after submitting to Cnut. Edmund returned to London where Æthelred died on 23 April. The citizens and the national councillors present chose Edmund as their king, but a larger number of nobles present at Southampton declared support for Cnut. Edmund would then travel to Wessex where the people submitted to him. While the Danes were besieging London, they learned of the army being levied in Wessex and quickly marched south. The two armies met at Penselwood and then at the two day Battle of Sherston. Edmund stayed in Wessex to raise further troops while the Danes returned to besiege London, only for the siege to be raised by Edmund.

== Battle ==
After relieving London, Edmund pursued the Danes and the battle of Brentford was fought two days later. The battle was a victory for Edmund, who lost enough men that he returned to Wessex to raise another army. The Anglo-Saxon Chronicle records the loss of men was caused by them drowning in the Thames, while historians Frank Stenton and Russel Poole have independently argued the men were lost in the battle.

The wording of the Anglo-Saxon Chronicle suggests the battle was fought to the south of the river crossing at Brentford, while other sources, including the Knútsdrápa suggest the battle was fought on both sides of the river.

== Aftermath ==
While Edmund was in Wessex raising a new army Cnut renewed the siege of London, but was again unsuccessful. The Anglo-Saxon Chronicle describes Edmund as raising an army from "the entire English nation". This army pursued Cnut into Kent where Eadric forsook Cnut, and from where Cnut crossed the Thames into Essex and began raiding Mercia. Edmund would overtake Cnut at the battle of Assandun on 18 October 1016, which was a victory for Cnut. Edmund and Cnut made peace at Alney in Gloucestershire with Cnut taking control of the area north of the Thames and the promise of a payment to his army, while Edmund held Wessex. London also came to a settlement with Cnut, providing payment and winter quarters. When Edmund died on 30 November 1016 Cnut gained the whole kingdom.

In 1017 Cnut married Æthelred's widow, Emma of Normandy. After his death in 1035 Emma tried to make her son, Harthacnut, king of England, and he would rule jointly with Harold Harefoot, Cnut's son by his first wife, until 1037 when Emma and Harthacnut were exiled from England.

A monument to historical events in Brentford, including the 1016 battle, stands outside the County court in Brentford.

== Sources ==
- Britannica. "Edmund II". www.britannica.com. Britannica.
- British Library. "Emma of Normandy". www.bl.uk. British Library Board. Archived from the original on 24 September 2022.
- Cavendish, Richard (February 2014). "Death of Svein Forkbeard". History Today. 64 (2).
- Clegg, Gillian (15 February 2011). Brentford Through Time. Amberley Publishing Limited. ISBN 978-1-4456-2708-3.
- Keynes, Simon (2007). "Eadric [Edric] Streona". Oxford Dictionary of National Biography (online ed.). Oxford University Press. doi:10.1093/ref:odnb/8511. (Subscription, Wikipedia Library access or UK public library membership required.)
- Lawson, M. K. (2004). "Edmund II [known as Edmund Ironside]". Oxford Dictionary of National Biography (online ed.). Oxford University Press. doi:10.1093/ref:odnb/8502. (Subscription, Wikipedia Library access or UK public library membership required.)
- Lawson, M. K. (2013). "Cnut [Canute]". Oxford Dictionary of National Biography (online ed.). Oxford University Press. doi:10.1093/ref:odnb/4579. (Subscription, Wikipedia Library access or UK public library membership required.)
- McDermott, David (March 2016). "The Brief but Brilliant Reign of Edmund Ironside". History Today. 66 (3): 41–45.
- McDermott, David (16 March 2020). "Wessex and the Reign of Edmund II Ironside". The land of the English King. Brill. ISBN 978-90-04-42189-9.
- North, Richard; Goeres, Erin; Finlay, Alison (21 June 2022). Anglo-Danish Empire: A Companion to the Reign of King Cnut the Great. Walter de Gruyter GmbH & Co KG. ISBN 978-1-5015-1333-6.
