= Ealdgyth (wife of Edmund Ironside) =

Queen of England from April–November 1016

Ealdgyth (c. 992 – after 1016), modern English Edith, may have been the name of the wife of Sigeferth son of Earngrim, thegn of the Seven Burghs, and later of King Edmund Ironside. She was probably the mother of Edmund's sons Edward the Exile and Edmund Ætheling.

The Anglo-Saxon Chronicle records that Sigeferth and his brother Morcar, described as "foremost thegns of the Seven Burghs" were killed at an assembly of the English nobility at Oxford. Ealdorman Eadric Streona is said to have killed them "dishonourably" after having invited them to his rooms. The Seven Burghs, otherwise unknown, are presumed to have been the Five Burghs and Torksey and York. Following the killings, King Æthelred the Unready had the property of Sigeferth and Morcar seized and ordered that Sigeferth's widow, whose name the Chronicle does not record, should be detained at Malmesbury Abbey. The chronicle of John of Worcester calls her Ealdgyth.

In the late summer of 1015, at some time between 15 August and 8 September, Edmund Ironside raised a revolt against his father King Æthelred. Either then, or perhaps even earlier, he removed Sigeferth's widow from Malmesbury, against his father's wishes, and married her. Sigeferth and Morcar's friends and allies supported Edmund after this. While two charters issued by Edmund which mention his wife survive from about this time, neither of them contain her name in the surviving texts.

It is generally, but not universally, supposed that Ealdgyth, if that was her name, was the mother of Edmund Ironside's sons. These were Edmund, who died young in exile, and Edward the Exile, who returned to England late in the reign of his uncle King Edward the Confessor and died soon afterwards. Whether she went into exile with her children following Edmund's death in 1016 is unknown.

One reason advanced for supposing that John of Worcester may have been mistaken in naming this woman Ealdgyth is that Sigeferth's brother Morcar had also been married to a woman named Ealdgyth. This Ealdgyth was the daughter of Ælfthryth, and niece of Ælfhelm, Ealdorman of York and Wulfric Spot. While Ealdgyth is a common female name in the period, this coincidence has raised the suspicion that the Worcester chronicler has confused Sigeferth's widow with his sister-in-law.

== Notes ==
Preceded by Emma of Normandy	Queen consort of England; 1016	Succeeded by Emma of Normandy
