= Edmund Ironside =

King of England in 1016

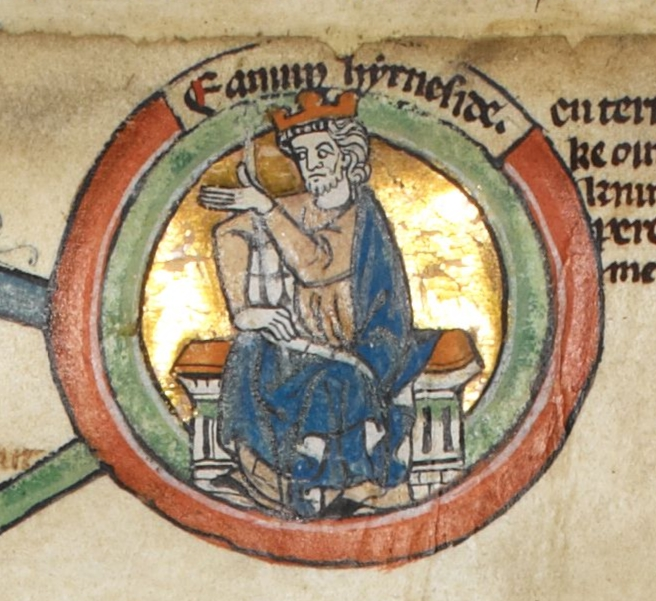
- Edmund in the early 14th century Genealogical Roll of the Kings of England

King of the English
- Reign: 23 April – 30 November 1016
- Predecessor: Æthelred II
- Successor: Cnut
- Born: c. 991; England
- Died: 30 November 1016 (aged 24–25); Oxford or London, England
- Burial: Glastonbury Abbey
- Spouse: Ealdgyth
- Issue: Edward the Exile; Edmund Ætheling
- House: Wessex
- Father: Æthelred II
- Mother: Ælfgifu of York

Edmund Ironside (c. 991 – 30 November 1016; Old English: Ēadmund, Old Norse: Játmundr, Latin: Edmundus; sometimes also known as Edmund II (Note: Numbers were not used to identify kings until well after the Norman Conquest of 1066, so their use to identify Anglo-Saxon kings is anachronistic. However, since Edmund I is usually identified as such, Edmund Ironside is sometimes referred to in the same manner.)) was King of the English from 23 April to 30 November 1016. Edmund's reign was spent fighting against a Danish invasion led by Cnut.

Edmund was born sometime between 990 and 993 to King Æthelred the Unready. Little is known about Edmund's life before 1015; the first concrete evidence of his agency was from the late 1000s and he seems to have been close with his brother Æthelstan. Although Edmund possibly fought alongside his father in the campaigns of 1009 to 1011 and the campaign of 1013, when the royal family was forced to flee to Normandy due to Sweyn Forkbeard's invasion that year, Edmund stayed in England with Æthelstan. Æthelstan died in June 1014 and in his will Edmund was the main beneficiary, receiving the sword of Offa and estates in the Danelaw. Edmund inherited Æthelstan's connections in the Five Boroughs. When his close allies Sigeferth and Morcar were executed with the permission of King Æthelred, he revolted, illegally marrying Sigeferth's widow and occupying the Five Boroughs. Edmund issued two charters, on one of which he called himself king.

Edmund's revolt was suddenly ended by the invasion of Sweyn's son Cnut in the summer of 1015. To contest Cnut's occupation in Wessex, he attempted to raise armies alongside his father and Eadric Streona, Ealdorman of Mercia, but they all collapsed due to mistrust. A third force raised with Uhtred of Bamburgh unravelled as Uhtred submitted to Cnut when the latter threatened Bamburgh. Æthelred died on 23 April 1016 and Edmund soon claimed the throne. He fought in four battles with Cnut at Penselwood, Sherston, Brentford, and possibly Otford, and gained military success. By the time he faced Cnut at the Battle of Assandun, he was backed by the "whole English nation" but Eadric Streona fled, causing a decisive English defeat. After a possible sixth battle, Edmund was forced to partition the kingdom at Alney, with Cnut receiving everything except for Wessex, held by Edmund.

Edmund died on 30 November after ruling for 222 days, allowing Cnut to consolidate the rest of England. Afterwards, Cnut exiled or executed Edmund's family and supporters. The Danish line founded by Cnut would end in 1042 and the House of Wessex was restored temporarily under Edmund's much younger half-brother, Edward the Confessor. Edgar the Ætheling, Edmund's grandson, was a claimant to the English throne for some time. Edmund's reputation was praised in medieval sources, and he is generally seen as a brave and capable king who fought Cnut to a standstill, forcing compromise.

== Background ==
English military leaders in Edmund Ironside's lifetime had with them a corps of household followers known variously as their Hirédmenn, Hearthweru, or other names. These warbands were strongly dependant on loyalty. The relationship between a lord and his house-men was strong, and in battle they acted as an elite, fighting alongside a lord personally. By the later Anglo-Saxon period, just about every major political leader would have had their own. This group could not be expected to handle major operations on their own, and was supplemented by the fyrd raised by local magnates; although a wider troop-base it was not usually summoned from commoners, but rather landowners, many of whom were aristocratic. The shire was used as a tactical and administrative unit, where armies could muster and be raised by the leading local figure. When necessary, military service may have been expanded to the lower classes.

Beginning in the 9th century, Scandinavian raids on English soil had steadily escalated, and they conquered East Anglia, as well as much of Northumbria. This came during a period of state formation in Scandinavia, with Norway, Sweden, and Denmark consolidating into kingdoms at about the same time as England was in the 10th century. Although many foreign writers referred to kings of Denmark, there were in fact many petty kings and princes. The Scandinavians were nowhere near uniform in their loyalties, clashing with each other and occasionally being recruited by Christian rulers.

Alfred the Great pushed back the threat and declared himself King of the Anglo-Saxons by the 890s. By the time of his son Edward the Elder's death in 924, the remaining Danish polities south of the Humber were in English hands. Edward's son Æthelstan conquered Northumbria to become the first King of England in 927. Edmund and his brother Eadred, who succeeded him as king because Edmund's own sons were too young, both lost and had to reconquer the north during their reigns. In 959, Edmund's second son Edgar was crowned as King of England, after the difficult reign of his elder brother Eadwig. He enjoyed a peaceful reign, which Frank Stenton called "singularly devoid of incident."

Edgar would die in 975, which caused a succession dispute between the faction of his elder son, Edward, and his younger son, Æthelred, in which Edward was successful. Edward was murdered in March 978 and was succeeded by Æthelred. (Note: Simon Keynes argues that Æthelred's reign saw the Viking armies that threatened England expand drastically in professionalism and size., However Abels disagrees, suggesting that the available sources don't point to such a difference.) Alfred had established a network of 30 burhs and a standing army year-round which proved effective against Viking armies during his reign, and during the conquests of his successors' reigns. Richard Abels tracks a lulling of English defences as the kings became more secure which reached its peak during Edward's reign, leaving the English dangerously vulnerable. Further, despite great efforts, the West Saxon dynasty could hardly rely on the support of its subjects within the former Danelaw. Æthelred's own character did not seem capable of addressing these issues. He is frequently compared to Alfred the Great in their contrasting success in dealing with invasion, although Keynes attempted to contextualise their differences. Stenton attributed "spasmodic violence" to Æthelred but this is also contested more recently. In the 1000s Æthelred would begin a programme of rearmament among the English warrior class.

== Primary sources ==
The Anglo-Saxon Chronicle (also known as ASC or Chronicle) as we know it likely has its origins in the late ninth century, under the rule of Alfred the Great. The annals of manuscripts (MSS) C, D, and E covering the period of 983 to 1022 are known as the Æthelredian Chronicle by some scholars, and display a tendency to praise Edmund for his vigor and effectiveness, but are strongly opposed to the policies of Æthelred and his advisors. Ian Howard divides Edmund's character as depicted in the ASC into two phases: the first phase begins in 1015 and ends by Æthelred's death in April 1016, and the second begins with Æthelred's death and ends with Edmund's own death in November. Although Howard calls the ASC "largely factual and also credible," the chronicler's recollection of events was colored by hindsight towards the events in question. Levi Roach comments in his biography of Æthelred that "foreknowledge of the eventual English defeat haunts his writing at every turn."

The anonymous author of the Encomium Emmae Reginae, often simply referred to as "The Encomiast," identifies himself in the text as a monk of the Abbey of Saint Bertin. He mentions that he wrote the work at the specific request of his patroness Emma, to whom he shows some gratitude, and that he had witnessed Cnut when the king visited the abbey on his journey homeward. He probably began his work during the reign of Harthacnut at the insistence of his patron, Emma of Normandy, and the Encomium was meant to signify the legitimacy of Emma and her children. Thus, he was more willing to manipulate factual history to serve political purpose than the chronicler. There are three contemporary sources on the period that are in the form of Norse poetry, the Knútsdrapa, the Víkingarvísur, and the Liðsmannaflokkr, the last of which being even more vague in place names than the former two. All three serve to promote the reputation of Cnut the Great.

== Early life ==
=== Childhood ===
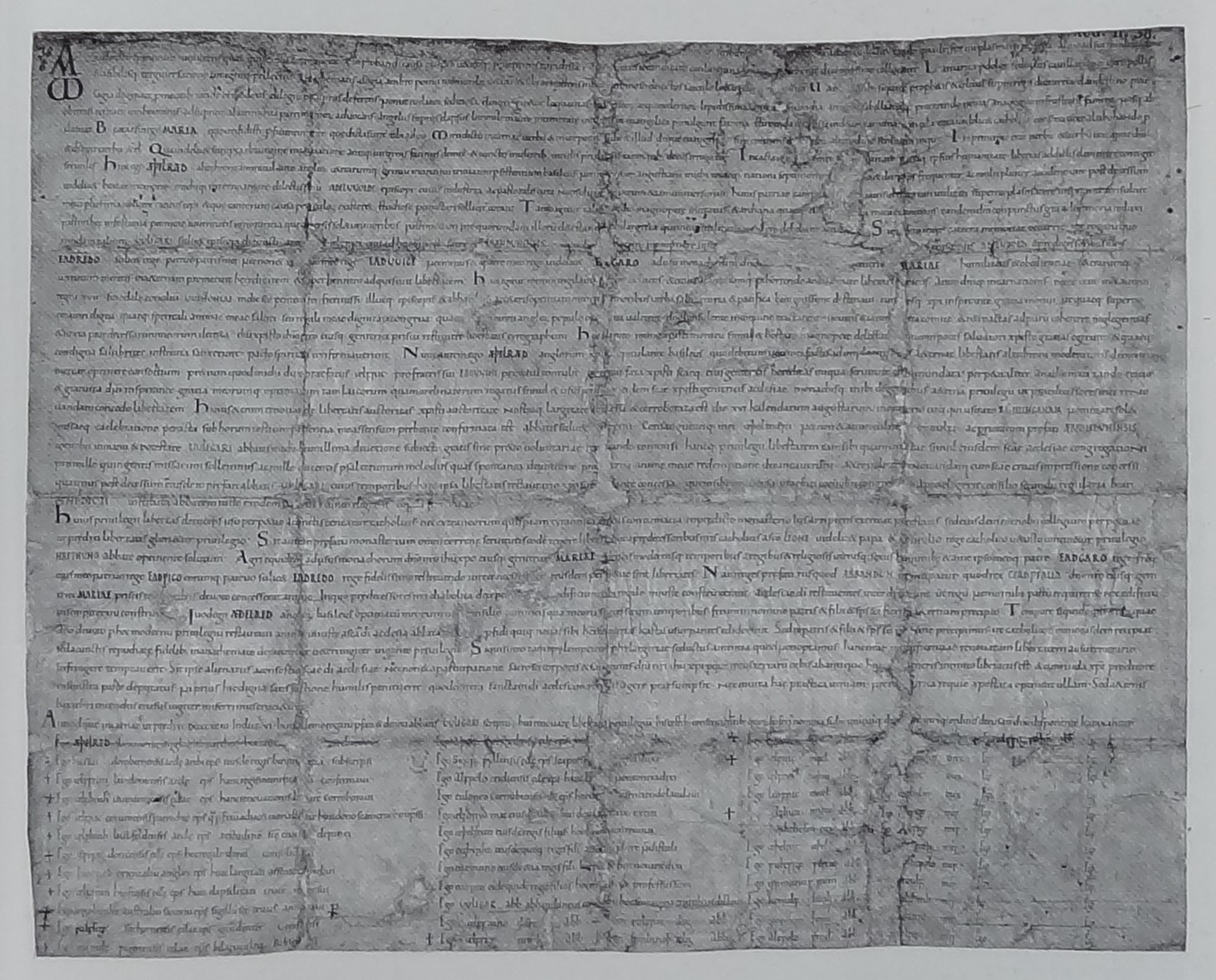
Charter S 876 of 4 June 993 in favour of Abingdon Abbey, issued by Edmund's father Æthelred.

The exact date of Edmund's birth is unclear, but it could have been no later than 993 when he was a signatory to charters along with his two elder brothers. Historian David McDermott suggests a birth year of 991. He was named after his great-grandfather, Edmund I. He was the third of the six sons of King Æthelred and his first wife, possibly called Ælfgifu, who was probably the daughter of Earl Thored of Northumbria. His elder brothers were Æthelstan and Egbert (died c. 1005). His younger brothers were Eadred, Eadwig and Edgar. He had four sisters, Eadgyth (or Edith), Ælfgifu, Wulfhilda, and the Abbess of Wherwell Abbey.

There is significant evidence that he was born in Wessex, possibly at Æthelingadene (modern-day Singleton), and raised by his grandmother, Ælfthryth. This gave him ties with the sons of Ordgar, who were powerful in the West Country. (Note: Ordgar was Edmund's great-grandfather through Ælfthryth) Ordwulf, Ordgar's son, was called "first among the men of Devon." Given his later career, Edmund was probably taught in the use of arms, religion, and virtues, though this is speculation. He was possibly taught at Wherwell Abbey, and likely in his mother's company.

Edmund's birth was preceded by disorder in England, caused by a famine in 986, and escalating raids in the 980s that culminated in the decisive English defeat at the Battle of Maldon and tribute payment to Vikings. Beyond the tribute of 10,000 pounds, the battle also saw the death of Ealdorman Byrhtnoth of Essex. As a result, Æthelred's attitude changed significantly. In 993, at Pentecost, he summoned a council at Winchester admitting to wrongdoing and setting out to correct his supposed errors. Æthelred promoted the cult of Edward the Martyr, and reconciled with the reform movement in England.

From 997, there had been constant raids in England. Despite a pause in 1000, they made their way to Edmund's place of upbringing at Æthelingadene in 1001. In 1002, Æthelred ordered the St Brice's Day Massacre. The Danes were seen as a moral threat, and furthermore Æthelred may have doubted their loyalty, although they were unlikely to form a fifth column. Scandinavian raids continued, led by Sweyn Forkbeard of Denmark from 1003 to 1004, and again in 1006, forcing the English into another tribute payment in 1007. (Note: Historin Levi Roach gives several arguments against completely discrediting Æthelred's use of the practice.) A large coalition led by the powerful Thorkell the Tall ravaged Southern England from 1009 to 1011, and found Æthelred's military response largely ineffective. After his men sacked Canterbury and killed Archbishop Ælfheah, Thorkell defected to Æthelred as a mercenary. Though unrecorded, Edmund may have gained some early military experience fighting in the campaigns of 1009–1011, and later in 1013. (Note: The martial footing of his elder brother Æthelstan's household, whom he was close with (see below), and that Edmund had just reached military age, suggest they could have been campaigning against the Norsemen. The chronicler may have wished to save Edmund of embarrassment by omitting unsuccessful campaigns he engaged in. He may have also fought with his father in 1013.) From 1005, Eadric Streona began to monopolise control at the king's court, forcing out many of Æthelred's former courtiers. Both Eadric and Uhtred of Bamburgh would marry daughters of Æthelred.

=== Second ætheling ===
Edmund's mother died around 1000, or alternatively may have been repudiated. Afterwards his father remarried, this time to Emma of Normandy. They had three children; Edward the Confessor, Alfred, and a daughter Godgifu. Æthelstan and Edmund seem to have been personally close and political allies, and they probably felt threatened by Emma's ambitions for her sons. Edward may have been born to Emma around 1004–1005, Godgifu 1007–1008, and Alfred 1011–1012. Sometime between 1007 and 1014, the church of Sherborne leased Edmund land at Holcombe Rogus. Edmund's lease, witnessed by his household servants, and his brother's will later on allows for a partial understanding of the æthelings' households. The lease elaborates on how Edmund came into possession of the property:

Here it is declared in this document that Edmund the Ætheling asked the community at Sherborne for permission to hold the estate at Holcombe. The community did not dare refuse him this [request], but said that they would certainly grant it, if the king and the bishop who was their superior gave their consent. Then they came to an agreement, and the Ætheling and the prior and the chief monks came to the king and informed him of the matter, and asked his consent, and Archbishop Wulfstan acted as spokesman. Then the king said that he did not wish the estate to be given away completely, but that on the contrary they should make such an arrangement that it should be given back to the holy foundation at a time agreed upon by all of them. Then it was agreed that the Ætheling should give the community 20 pounds for the estate as it stood with its produce and its men and everything, and should enjoy it during his lifetime, and after his death it should revert to the holy foundation with its produce and its men and everything as it then was.

It witnessed by Bishop Lyfing of Wells (later Archbishop of Canterbury), Bishop Æthelric of Sherborne, Bishop Æthelsige of Cornwall, and Æthelmær the Stout, suggesting a connection with these men. Other signatories included Archbishop Wulfstan of York and Eadric Streona, who acted as the king's representatives in the grant.

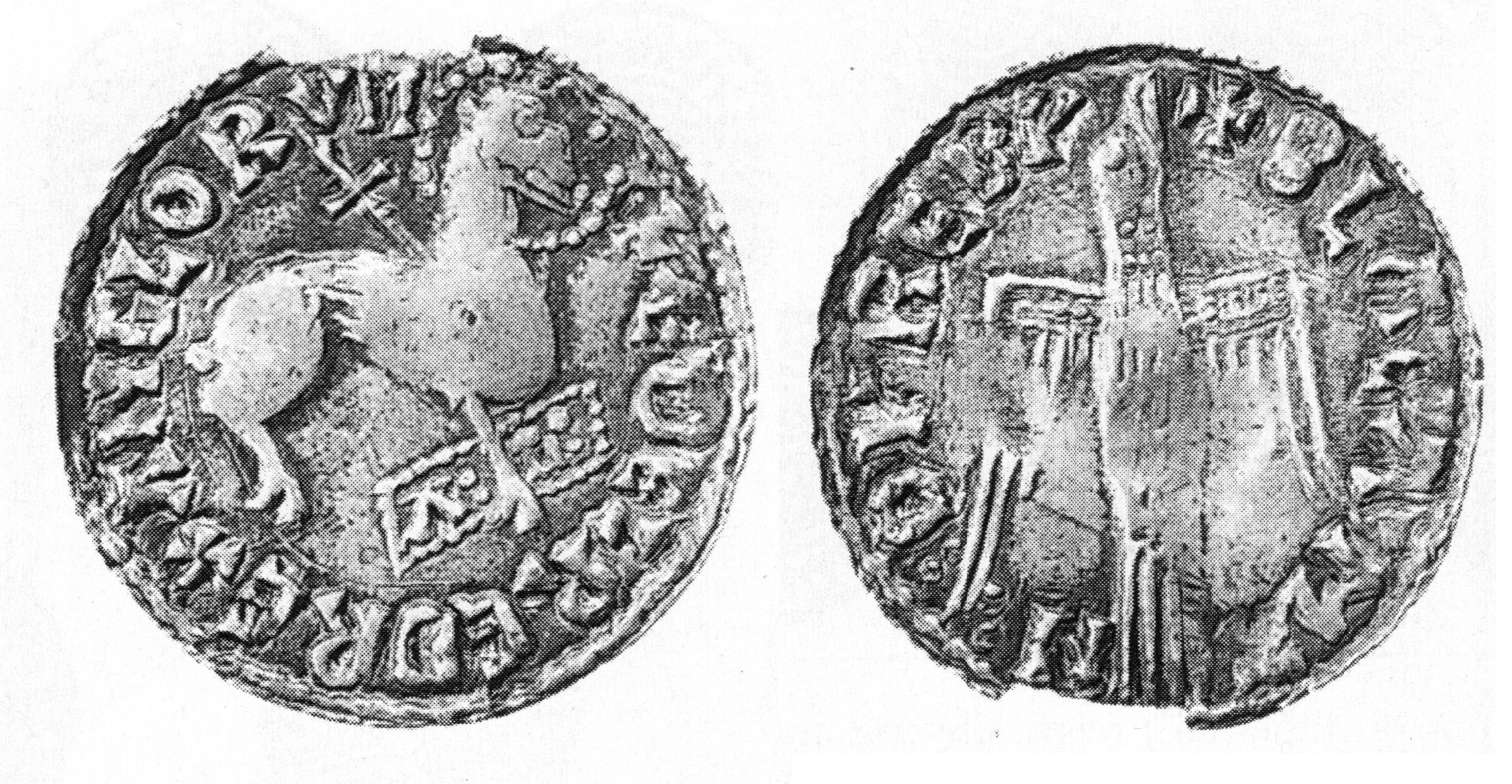
Silver penny, Agnus Dei type, minted by King Æthelred.

Sweyn launched an invasion of England in 1013 alongside his son Cnut. After landing at Sandwich in August, he routed some initial resistance before heading northwards, receiving the submission of the English north of Watling Street. He then made his way south of Watling Street, at which point his men "did the greatest damage that any army could do," according to the ASC C. Sweyn first attacked London, but lacking success he secured the rest of Wessex, receiving Ealdorman Æthelmær's submission. Isolated, London surrendered, forcing Æthelred to flee for Normandy with his family, except for his two eldest living sons, Edmund and Æthelstan. It seems that those two had chosen to stay in England rather than fleeing with their father. (Note: Alternatively, the sons may have found a separate hiding spot in Ireland. Abels even expresses doubt that Æthelstan was still alive at this point.) Sweyn died in February 1014, and his supporters, concentrated at Lindsey, and the Danish army, accepted Cnut as king. However, Cnut was untested militarily, and Sweyn's death had weakened the Danish cause in England. Meanwhile Æthelred returned to England around Lent and raised an army from London, with which he attacked Cnut in April. Cnut was quickly defeated and fled to Denmark.

Æthelstan "almost certainly" died in June of 1014. Edmund was the main beneficiary in his brother's will; he received three swords (one from Offa), a silver trumpet, land in East Anglia and Derbyshire, and the responsibility of fulfilling a number of bequests. Æthelstan's will also reflected the close relationship between the brothers and the nobility of the East Midlands. Edmund maintained Æthelstan's alliance with the Danelaw brothers Sigeferth and Morcar against Eadric Streona. One possible reason for their enmity was that Eadric was sympathetic to the claim of Emma's children, but there is no definite evidence. Edmund became the heir presumptive for the throne, and headed the princes on the king's charters.

== Marriage and revolt ==
In early 1015, at an assembly in Oxford, Sigeferth and Morcar were tricked and executed by Eadric Streona. Æthelred, who was complicit, took over their lands and forced Sigeferth's wife, usually called Ealdgyth, to retire to a monastery at Malmesbury. He may have chosen Malmesbury because it was a defensible royal burh, and also to drag her away from unrest in the midlands over the brothers' execution. (Note: Most historians accept that she was forced to and detained at Malmesbury. However, David McDermott cautiously suggests that she could have been held for her own protection at Malmesbury, as the abuse of widows for their wealth was recognized in Anglo-Saxon society.) (Note: While not justifying Æthelred's action, which she called a "gross infraction of the laws of hospitality," Williams does provide possible explanations for Æthelred's decision, including suspicion of renewed disloyalty. By contrast, Roach attributes it to the domineering influence of Eadric: "they suggest that Æthelred was increasingly a pawn in Eadric's powerful and grasping hands." McDermott, echoing historians including Simon Keynes and Pauline Stafford, offers both their submission to Sweyn and potential scheming with Edmund to depose Æthelred.)

Edmund reacted by rescuing Ealdgyth from Malmesbury and marrying her against the king's will. (Note: In a law code of Æthelred's, it is established that widows must stay unmarried for at least a year, after which point they could marry as they wished. Edmund's decision to marry Ealdgyth was thus illegal.) Aside from the killing of his political allies, Edmund may have been provoked by the promotion of Emma of Normandy, her son Edward, and Eadric Streona at court. There were many incidents at the time of noblewomen being taken and married, although some of these women probably colluded in their own abduction. William of Malmesbury had access to the monastery's records on the topic, and he claims that upon seeing the widow, Edmund was taken with her. More practically, by marrying her, he could reinforce his prestige and consolidate his support in Mercia. Given his willingness to disobey the king, Edmund may have lost respect for his father Æthelred's commands.

Edmund probably used Malmesbury as a base to summon supporters before, with his new bride marching northwards along the Fosse Way–an old Roman road–to the Five Boroughs, possibly with the addition of Torksey (or Derby) and York. He then received the submission of the people of the Five Boroughs, and seized Sigeferth and Morcar's lands. This would have been significant property. The ASC C calls the brothers "the chief thegns belonging to the Seven Boroughs," and Morcar's lands were concentrated in Derbyshire. To gain support, Edmund issued at least two charters, granting land in Northamptonshire and Suffolk, and may have issued more. On his diplomas, he went so far as to call himself King Edmund Ætheling, which may have exacerbated the situation, but changed to simply calling himself the son of the king. Edmund's actions in the year were near-treasonous in nature. (Note: It's possible Edmund had attempted to claim the throne between Sweyn's death and Æthelred's return to England, but that would have been recorded in no annals or histories, and has little evidence either way. If Sigeferth and Morcar colluded with Edmund in this endeavor, this may explain their executions.) The events probably took place between August and September, based on the accounts of the chronicle and John of Worcester, which date them to between the Assumption and Nativity of Mary.

== King at war ==
=== Initial defence ===
After being ejected from England, Cnut was at Denmark, where his brother Harald ruled. Possibly taking advantage of the upheaval created in England, he launched his invasion and landed at Sandwich. From here, rather than heading northward, where he would face Edmund, Cnut travelled deeper into Wessex to sack Dorset, Somerset, and Wiltshire. Both Edmund and Cnut had influence with the midlands, and Edmund now directly controlled much of it, but Edmund's first few attempts to bring armies against Cnut were unsuccessful. The situation was confused; Æthelred lay bedridden at Cosham and Edmund was formally in revolt. Still, Edmund raised an army from the Five Boroughs and joined with Eadric's own force by late September or early October. This force also disintegrated, allegedly due to betrayal on Eadric's part, who then quickly surrendered to Cnut.

Eadric was followed by the West Saxons, who gave Cnut hostages and supplies. By the end of 1015, Æthelred's control over his kingdom was collapsing, while Edmund controlled the Danelaw and Eastern Mercia, and Cnut held central Wessex. In January of 1016, Cnut and Eadric advanced into Hwicce and Warwickshire where his men "ravaged and burnt, and killed all they came across" according to the ASC C. In response, Edmund raised an army amongst the Mercians, however they demanded that King Æthelred join them alongside the Londoners. It has been suggested that this was due to Edmund's lack of distinction as king, however there are other examples of powerful noblemen raising armies in Anglo-Saxon England, even in the campaign of 1015–1016. The Mercians probably lacked confidence of victory without the London garrison, and were outnumbered by Cnut and Eadric.

Æthelred sent out orders for another general summons which Edmund carried out, threatening penalties on those who did not comply. On the pleading of his son, Æthelred agreed to travel north from London, where he had fled after Wessex, with as many men he could muster, possibly meeting Edmund at St Albans. However this force collapsed too as Æthelred fled due to perceived treachery. The ASC C claims that "those who should support him" were the perpetrators. (Note: The identity of the perpetrator is not known, however possibilities include Danish mercenaries, relatives of Sigeferth and Morcar, or even Edmund himself.) At this point Edmund travelled northwards where he met Uhtred, his brother-in-law, either at Bamburgh or York. Together, they attacked Staffordshire, Shrewsbury, and Cheshire, which had defected to Cnut. He may have intended to attack Eadric’s support base and may have consciously refused battle with Cnut. Cnut attacked the regions loyal to Edmund and headed to Northumbria along the Great North Road. His lands threatened, Uhtred rushed north and surrendered to Cnut upon hearing of this, but was executed. Soon afterwards, Edmund returned to his weakening father at London, possibly with the additional intention of raising troops. Æthelred would die on 23 April 1016 with Edmund by his side, who quickly arranged his burial at Old St Paul's Cathedral, London. Father and son had made peace.

=== First battles against Cnut ===
Map of the 1015–1016 campaign in England

The citizens and councillors in London chose Edmund as king and probably crowned him. The coronation would have been done by Lyfing of Canterbury, who held ties with Edmund since at least witnessing his lease at Holcombe. The majority of the English magnates, in a Witan meeting at Southampton, elected Cnut. In McDermott's view, factors working in Edmund's favor for the election included his presence at London, the destabilising effect of Streona's switching sides, and Cnut's campaign in the country. There was another claimant to the throne by Æthelred's death, Emma's son Edward, but his claim lacked support in England.

In Pauline Stafford's view, there was "properly no English resistance" before the death of Æthelred. After his election, Edmund marched into Wessex and John of Worcester claims that the West Saxons enthusiastically submitted to him. However the more likely option was that Edmund had to use force and faced some resistance, as the West Saxon aristocracy was sharply divided in supporting Edmund. Welsh support of Edmund is attested contemporaneously in Thietmar's Chronicle and the Liðsmannaflokkr. Given Eadric Streona's prior raids into Wales, they were probably motivated by opposition to the ealdorman. Beyond this, Edmund probably also relied on "deep wells of loyalty" to the royal family in Wessex, and may plausibly have had access to Scandinavian mercenaries left over from Æthelred. With his new base, he began raising an army, possibly from the shires of Somerset, Wiltshire, and Dorset.

After Edmund had left for Wessex, Cnut arrived at Greenwich around the Rogation days on 7–9 May and promptly besieged London. Unable to capture the city, Cnut campaigned into Wessex and faced Edmund at Penselwood. Generations later, Anglo-Norman narratives give the victory to Edmund, and this is accepted by multiple modern historians. However, Florence of Worcester claimed that Edmund was unable to raise enough troops in time, which James uses to suggest that Edmund would not have initiated fighting and that Cnut was victorious. Alternatively, the result of Penselwood may have been inconclusive or even embarrassing for Edmund, causing reticence in the ASC. By this argument, the Anglo-Normans declared Edmund the victor for ideological reasons.

If the English were in fact defeated, then according to James, Edmund may have broken off from fighting and made his way towards Bath, in Somerset, while being pursued by Cnut. In any case, the subsequent Battle of Sherston took place in the last week of June, and the Danish army was probably led by Cnut himself. (Note: While the Encomiast claims that the Danes were led by Thorkell the Tall, this is contradicted by the earlier Knútsdrapa, and is itself suspect.) According to the ASC C, "a great number on both sides fell there." Although Sherston was exhausting for both sides, Edmund, who is reputed to have fought bravely, seems to have won a marginal victory, maintaining the field. Sherston strengthened Edmund's position in Wessex, and Malmesbury claimed that the remaining West Saxons submitted to Edmund, which is supported by repeated mentions of him raising troops from the region. As a result, Sherston was a watershed moment, which gave Edmund the support base to maintain his resistance to Cnut. (Note: Bolton argues that Sherston was part of a general defection against Edmund for Cnut, though his argument is specifically referring to a group of noble English defectors.)

=== Road to Assandun ===
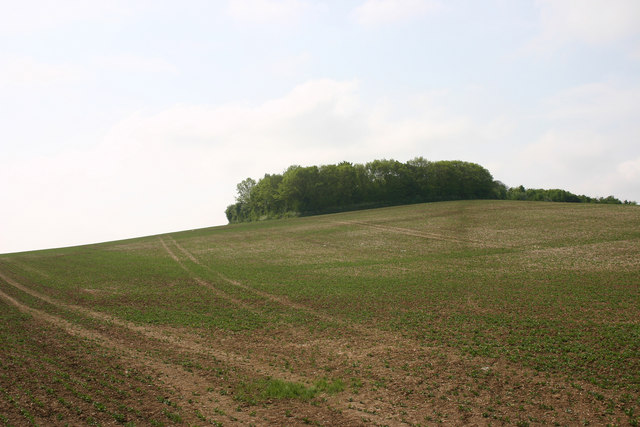
Ashingdon hill in Essex, the more likely location of the Battle of Assandun

Cnut returned to besiege London, and Edmund raised a third army from Wessex before travelling to the town's relief. As he marched, Edmund kept north of the Thames and launched a surprise attack from Tottenham, causing the Danes to flee to their ships. (Note: The ASC uses the term "Clayhanger," now identified with Clayhill Farm in Tottenham.) Edmund stayed in London for two days before renewing the pursuit, crossing the Thames around Brentford and attacking Cnut, who had used the time to establish himself elsewhere, possibly at Brentford. Edmund defeated Cnut and the Danes were forced to flee, however many of Edmund's men drowned in the river Thames, and he returned to Wessex to raise troops. In the English king's absence, Cnut renewed the siege, and from the perspective of the Londoners this may have made Brentford a hollow victory.

Cnut made little progress, and possibly around September, went on a plundering detour into Mercia. Cnut's army returned to Kent by the River Medway, but Edmund quickly rallied another army and pursued the Danes to the Isle of Sheppey, likely having routed them in battle at Otford. However, he ceased his pursuit when Eadric Streona came over to him at Aylesford. It is clear that by this point Edmund was increasingly gaining influence over a wide area, even beyond his support bases in the Five Boroughs and Wessex, and the war was turning in his favour. But his decision to allow Eadric back into his ranks was criticised heavily by the ASC, of which the C manuscript says that "no greater folly was ever agreed to." Afterwards, Edmund returned to Wessex for a short time.

Possibly in retaliation to Eadric's betrayal, Cnut's army raided into Essex and then Mercia. According to the ASC C, Edmund raised an army from "the whole English nation," which likely refers to a wide base of support more than a nation in arms, and pursued the Danes as they returned into Essex, whereupon he overtook Cnut. The East Anglians, led by Ulfcytel, took up a significant portion of Edmund's army alongside his supporters in the Five Boroughs. The king was also joined by Bishop Eadnoth of Dorchester, and possibly his younger brother Eadwig. The Battle of Assandun is unusual in how precisely it can be dated, taking place on 18 October, lasting from just after noon to just before midnight, which itself is exceptional for its length. Although he had claimed the high ground, Edmund charged downhill onto Cnut's army, and the Danish line appeared to buckle. Either due to prior planning or fear in battle, Eadric fled from the battle, which opened the door to a decisive Danish victory. The battle is recounted in the ASC C:

When the king learnt that the army had gone inland, for the fifth time he collected all the English nation; and pursued them and overtook them in Essex at the hill which is called Ashingdon, and they stoutly joined battle there. Then Ealdorman Eadric did as he had often done before: he was the first to start the flight with the Magonsæte, and thus betrayed his liege lord and all the people of England. There Cnut had the victory and won for himself all the English people. There was Bishop Eadnoth killed, and Abbot Wulfsige, and Ealdorman Ælfric, and Godwine, the ealdorman of Lindsey, and Ulfcetel of East Anglia, and Æthelweard, son of Ealdorman Æthelwine, and all the nobility of England was there destroyed.

=== Treaty and death ===
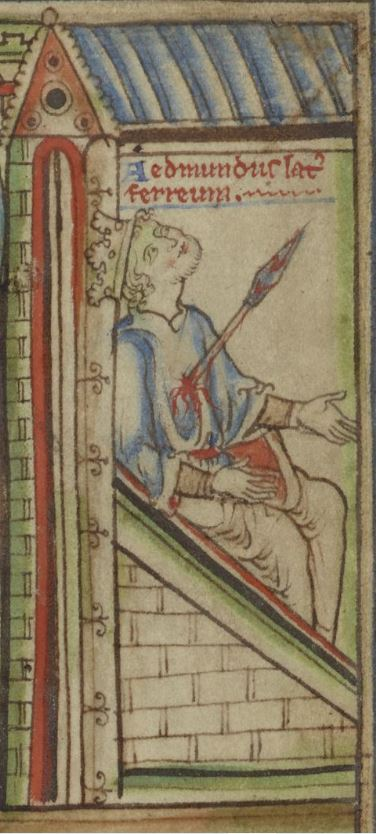
Death of Edmund Ironside (Cambridge University Library)

According to the Encomiast, the English, "familiar with the locality," were able to withdraw shielded by the night. Edmund suffered significant losses at Assandun including the deaths of many of his allies, as listed by the ASC. Despite this great loss, Edmund was evidently eager to keep fighting. The Encomiast claims that Edmund wished to "assemble a more powerful force." Possibly in an effort to raise this army from a fresh source of troops, Edmund travelled to Gloucestershire. The Knútsdrapa attests to another battle at a place called Danaskógar – likely referring to the Forest of Dean – and that the English were massacred, though its reliability is questionable.

Edmund and Cnut had reached a standstill after heavy fighting, and the English magnates, supposedly led by Eadric, were increasingly pushing him to make peace. Edmund ultimately met with Cnut at Alney, near Deerhurst, at which point hostages were exchanged. The two leaders encamped their armies on opposite sides of the Severn, and sailed to an island within the Severn, where talks were held. Edmund and Cnut declared their friendship and paid off Cnut's army. The ASC C records the agreement as follows:

And the kings met at Alney and established their friendship there both with pledge and with oath, and fixed the payment for the Danish army. And with this reconciliation they separated, and Edmund succeeded to Wessex and Cnut to Mercia.

The D Manuscript records the event differently:

And the kings met by Deerhurst, and became parters and sworn brothers and established that both with pledge and also with oaths, and fixed the payment for the Danish army. And with this reconciliation they separated, and Edmund succeeded to Wessex and Cnut to the north part.

Cnut and his allies received all of England north of Wessex. Possibly suggested by Edmund's messengers, this agreement left Edmund with the political heartland of the kingdom. Edmund died on 30 November 1016 after ruling for 222 days, possibly at London or Oxford. The cause is unknown, but he could have died from disease or injuries. Contemporary accounts do not suggest that he was murdered, but soon after the Norman Conquest, Adam of Bremen wrote that he had been poisoned. Cnut had a proven record for assassinating his opponents, and McDermott attributes some merit to Adam's claim. Various twelfth-century writers stated that he was stabbed or shot with an arrow while sitting on a toilet, however it's unlikely these are true. McDermott argues that Edmund probably died due to exhaustion from campaigning, and there is no evidence he was murdered. (Note: To M.K. Lawson, these stories "doubtless owe more to folklore than history." Timothy Bolton says that it is equally possible he died due to campaign fatigue and injuries as to assassination. McDermott summarises some of the arguments either way, but concludes that Edmund more probably died from a mix of exhaustion, wounds, and illness.)

== Aftermath ==
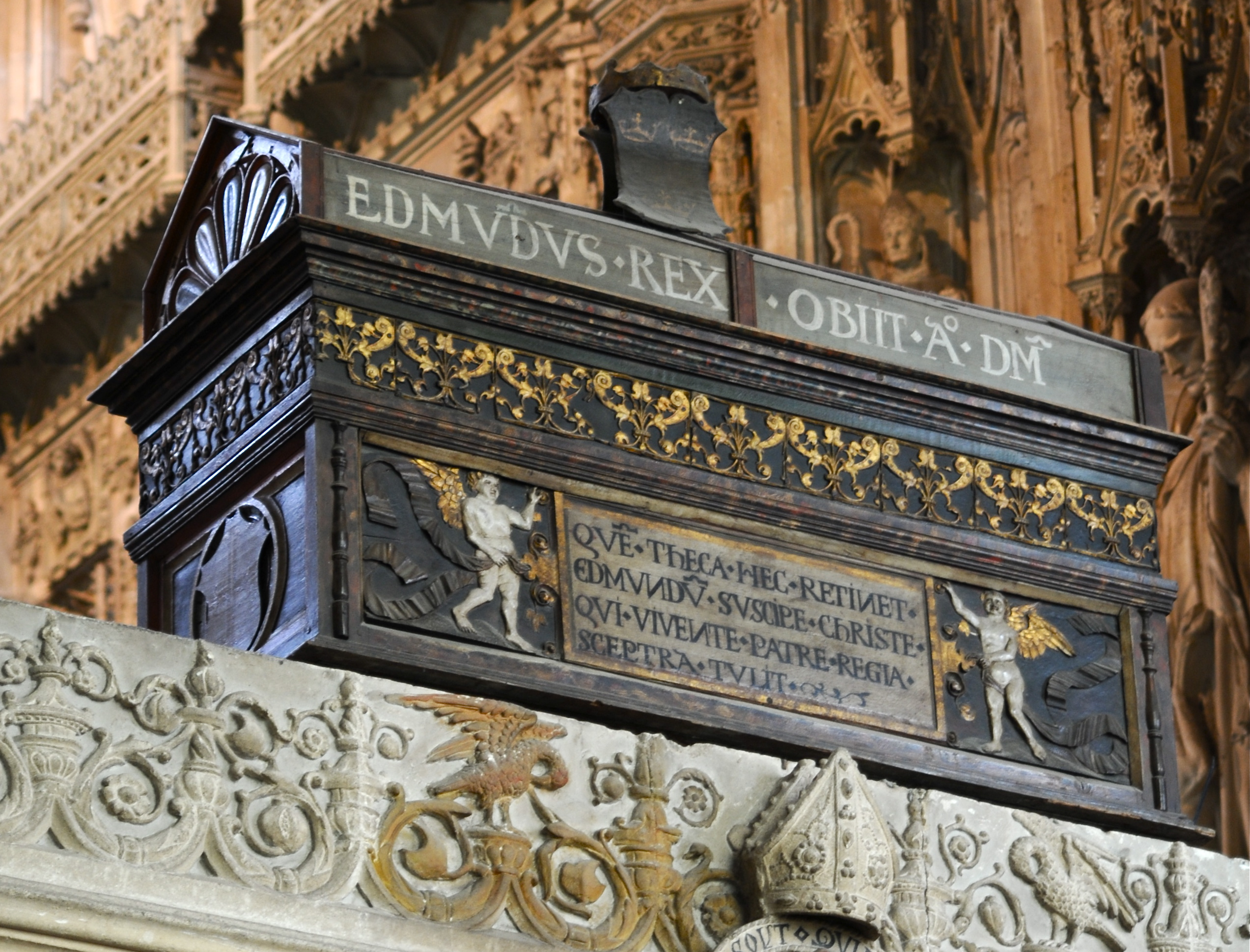
Mortuary chest of King Edmund, possibly Edmund Ironside

Edmund was buried near his grandfather Edgar at Glastonbury Abbey in Somerset. On the 15th anniversary of Edmund's death, Cnut would visit his tomb, laying a cloak of peacocks over it symbolising salvation and resurrection of the flesh. Glastonbury Abbey was destroyed during the Dissolution of the Monasteries in the 16th century, and any remains of a monument or crypt may have been plundered; hence the location of his remains is unclear. They may have been moved to the mortuary chest of a "King Edmund" at Winchester Cathedral.

Cnut would secure the whole of England soon after Edmund's death. He executed Eadric Streona in 1017, and implanted his own followers in Mercia. In dealing with Edmund's old supporters and family, he faced a potential usurpation attempt, and responded with expulsions and executions. He also shored up his political support by marrying Emma of Normandy, which had the benefit of continuity and ensuring that Normandy would not back any usurpation attempts from the remaining æthelings. Cnut's dynasty lasted until 1042 with the death of his son Harthacnut and restoration of Wessex in Edward the Confessor, the last uncontested Anglo-Saxon king of England. He would be succeeded by William the Conqueror in the wake of the Norman Conquest.

== Historiography ==
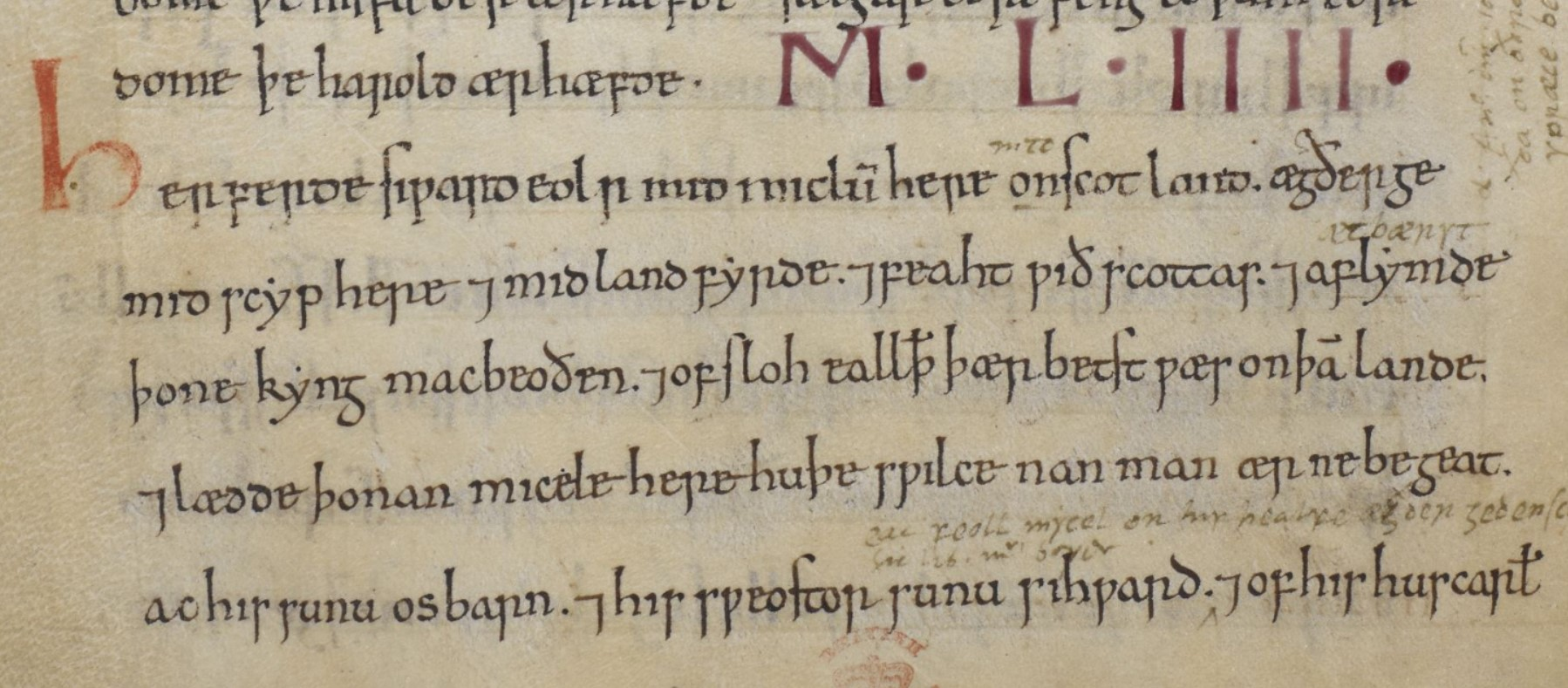
An 11th-century (1054) entry of the Anglo-Saxon Chronicle, MS D

A lost source derived from the ASC, which Howard refers to as the Life of King Edmund Ironside for simplicity, introduced the by-names of Ironside around 1057 for Edmund and Streona for Eadric, and also informed John of Worcester's history. By the mid-11th century, the by-name Ironside must have already been known. Indeed, it may even have been contemporary to Edmund. By the 12th century, the perception of Edmund had only improved. The Anglo-Norman chroniclers often inserted new information not present in 11th-century sources. Consistently, they characterised Edmund as an indefatigable and capable warrior, contrasted strongly with Æthelred, whom William of Malmesbury was the harshest in criticising. Literary invention was common, as was borrowing from classical and folkloric traditions to craft and augment narratives.

Edmund's short reign led to academic neglect. However, there is a positive historical consensus on the quality of Edmund's leadership. In Lawson's view, he was "probably a highly determined, skilled and indeed inspiring leader of men," whose efforts against Cnut were only matched in intensity by Alfred the Great. Stenton, although he believed that England's fate had already been decided in 1009–1012, remarked that Edmund "had a reputation of the kind which made a king formidable in disaster." Levi Roach, at the end of his biography of Æthelred the Unready, called Edmund a "worthy successor." McDermott's assessment of Edmund is as such:

The brevity of Edmund's reign has led to him being overlooked, but he should be accorded the recognition that is rightfully his. In the space of six months he proved himself to be a talented military leader, possessed of an indomitable will. He summoned five armies, relieved the siege of London and won all but one of his engagements against the Danes. His single defeat was the result not of incompetence but betrayal. Edmund did not live long enough to enact any laws, reform the Church or transform the country's military structures, but his brief reign saw the reappearance of something that had been absent in Anglo-Saxon England for several generations: a dynamic, resolute and successful warrior-king.

Some historians have been less charitable towards Edmund. Timothy Bolton characterises him in contrast to Cnut as the straightforward warrior facing off against a more cunning and underhanded rival. He does not conclude that the conflict was a one-sided affair, rather one that rested on the shifting resolve of the English aristocracy. According to Howard, Edmund's rebellious actions in 1015 became so severe that Æthelred ultimately "feared for his life when in [Edmund's] company." Edmund's short reign to Howard was "no more than a postscript" to Æthelred's. Where Lawson felt that Edmund's successes, contrasted with his father's misfortunes, showed proof that the late Anglo-Saxon state was still effective under good leadership, Simon Keynes has argued many of Æthelred's failures were due to factors beyond his reach. (Note: Æthelred's culpability in the Danish conquest of England is a topic of debate among historians. See Background section.)

== Issue ==
In 1015, Edmund married the widow of Sigeferth, who is supposedly named Ealdgyth. With her, he had two known children, both of whom were sent away by Cnut to secure his own position:

1. Edward the Exile (b. 1016) – Travelled back to England in 1057 as a potential heir but died on the way. With his wife Agatha, a kinsman of either Henry II or Henry III of Germany, he had three children:
  1. Edgar the Ætheling (born c. 1052) – Edgar was thus the grandson of Edmund. He was elected as King of the English after the Battle of Hastings, and in 1069 he led a revolt in Northumbria for his claim. Edgar never successfully claimed the English throne and by 1125 he had retired.
  2. Saint Margaret – married Malcolm Canmore, King of Scotland, and was canonised shortly after her death. Her daughter Edith, renamed Matilda, married the Anglo-Norman King Henry I of England. As Matilda and Henry's own grandson, Henry Curtmantle, became King of England after 1154, Edmund is an ancestor to all the English kings after Stephen.
  3. Cristina
2. Edmund Ætheling (b. 1016 or 1017) – died in Hungary.

== See also ==
- List of monarchs of Wessex
- Cnut's invasion of England
- Anglo-Saxon warfare

== Sources ==
- Abels, Richard (2022). Aethelred the Unready (Penguin Monarchs): The Failed King. Penguin Books. ISBN 9780141999371. Archived from the original on 24 April 2026.
- Abels, Richard (1988). Lordship and Military Obligation in Anglo-Saxon England. University of California Press. ISBN 0520057945.
- Abels, Richard (2001). "From Alfred to Harold II: The Military Failure of the Late Anglo- Saxon State". In Abels, Richard; Bachrach, Bernard (eds.). The Normans and their Adversaries at War. The Boydell Press. pp. 15–30. ISBN 9780851158471. Archived from the original on 12 April 2026.
- Bolton, Timothy (2017). Cnut the Great. Yale University Press. ISBN 978-0-300-22625-6. Archived from the original on 13 April 2026.
- Campbell, Alistair, ed. (1949). Encomium Emmae Reginae. Cambridge University Press.
- Foot, Sarah (2011). "Æthelstan [Athelstan]". Oxford Dictionary of National Biography (online ed.). Oxford University Press. doi:10.1093/ref:odnb/833. (Subscription, Wikipedia Library access or UK public library membership required.)
- Harrison, Mark (1993). Anglo-Saxon Thegn AD 449–1066. Illustrated by Garry Embleton. Osprey Publishing. ISBN 9781855323490.
- Higham, Nicholas J. (1997). The Death of Anglo-Saxon England. Sutton Publishing. ISBN 9780750908856.
- Hollister, Charles Warren (1962). Anglo-Saxon Military Institutions on the Eve of the Norman Conquest. Clarendon Press.
- Hooper, Nicholas (2004). "Edgar Ætheling". Oxford Dictionary of National Biography (online ed.). Oxford University Press. doi:10.1093/ref:odnb/8465. (Subscription, Wikipedia Library access or UK public library membership required.)
- Howard, Ian (2013). "Promoting Royal Authority in England: the Making of Edmund Ironside". In Owen-Crocker, Gale; Schneider, Brian (eds.). Royal Authority in Anglo-Saxon England. Oxford, UK: BAR Publishing. pp. 29–35. ISBN 978-1-4073-1158-6.
- Howard, Ian (2003). Swein Forkbeard’s Invasions and the Danish Conquest of England, 991-1017. Bowdell Press. ISBN 9780851159287.
- James, Jeffrey (2013). An Onslaught of Spears: The Danish Conquest of England. The History Press. ISBN 978-0-7509-5198-2. Archived from the original on 20 April 2026.
- Keynes, Simon (2009). "A Tale of Two Kings: Alfred the Great and Æthelred the Unready". Transactions of the Royal Historical Society. 36: 195–217. doi:10.2307/3679065. ISSN 1474-0648. Archived from the original on 30 September 2025.
- Lavelle, Ryan (2008). Aethelred II: King of the English. The History Press.
- Lavelle, Ryan (2017). Cnut: The North Sea King. Penguin Books. ISBN 9780141979885.
- Lawson, M. K. (2004). "Edmund II". Oxford Dictionary of National Biography (online ed.). Oxford University Press. doi:10.1093/ref:odnb/8502. (Subscription, Wikipedia Library access or UK public library membership required.)
- Lund, Niels (2020). "Why Did Cnut Conquer England?". In Ward, Emily Joan; Ashe, Laura (eds.). Conquests in Eleventh-Century England: 1016, 1066. The Boydell Press. pp. 23–40. ISBN 9781787448360.
- Mason, Emma (2004). "Lyfing (d. 1020)". Oxford Dictionary of National Biography (online ed.). Oxford University Press. doi:10.1093/ref:odnb/16798. (Subscription, Wikipedia Library access or UK public library membership required.)
- McDermott, David (2020). "Wessex and the Reign of Edmund II Ironside". In Langlands, Alexander; Lavelle, Ryan (eds.). The Land of the English Kin: Studies in Wessex and Anglo-Saxon England in Honour of Professor Barbara Yorke. Brill. pp. 336–352. ISBN 978-90-04-34949-0. Archived from the original on 8 March 2024.
- McDermott, David (1 March 2016). "The Brief but Brilliant Reign of Edmund Ironside. EBSCOhost". openurl.ebsco.com.
- McDermott, David (2018). Æthelinghood, Succession and Kingship in Late Anglo-Saxon England, with Specific Reference to Edmund II Ironside (phd thesis). The University of Winchester (United Kingdom). Archived from the original on 12 September 2024.
- Miller, Sean (2011). "Edward [called Edward the Elder]". Oxford Dictionary of National Biography (online ed.). Oxford University Press. doi:10.1093/ref:odnb/8514. (Subscription, Wikipedia Library access or UK public library membership required.)
- Mynors, R. A. B.; Thomson, R. M.; Winterbottom, M., eds. (1998). William of Malmesbury: Gesta Regum Anglorum, The History of the English Kings (in Latin and English). Vol. I. Oxford, UK: Clarendon Press. ISBN 978-0-19-820678-1.
- Parker, Eleanor (2022). Conquered: The Last Children of Anglo-Saxon England. Bloomsbury Publishing. ISBN 9781350287075.
- Pollington, Stephen (2001). The English Warrior: From Earliest Times to 1066. Anglo-Saxon Books. ISBN 1898281106.
- Poole, Russell (1987). "Skaldic Verse and Anglo-Saxon History: Some Aspects of the Period 1009-1016". Speculum. 62 (2): 265–298. doi:10.2307/2855227. ISSN 0038-7134. Archived from the original on 12 December 2025.
- Robertson, A. J. (1956). Anglo-Saxon Charters (2nd ed.). Cambridge University Press.
- Roach, Levi (2016). Æthelred: The Unready. Yale University Press. ISBN 978-0-300-22520-4. Archived from the original on 25 April 2026.
- Stafford, Pauline (1989). Unification and Conquest: A Political and Social History of England in the Tenth and Eleventh Centuries. Edward Arnold. ISBN 9780713165326.
- Stenton, F. M. (Frank Merry) (1971). Anglo-Saxon England. Oxford [England] Clarendon Press. ISBN 978-0-19-821716-9.
- Swanton, Michael J. (1998). The Anglo-Saxon Chronicles. London. ISBN 978-0415921299.
- Whitelock, Dorothy; Douglas, David; Tucker, Susie, eds. (1961). The Anglo-Saxon Chronicle. London, UK: Eyre and Spottiswoode. OCLC 317315404.
- Williams, Ann (1999). Kingship and Government in Pre-Conquest England. Bloomsbury Publishing. ISBN 9781349274543.
- Williams, Ann (2008). The World Before Domesday: The English Aristocracy 871-1066. A&C Black. ISBN 978-1-84725-239-5. Archived from the original on 16 April 2026.
- Williams, Ann (2003). Athelred the Unready: The Ill-Counselled King. A&C Black. ISBN 978-1-85285-382-2.
- Williams, Ann (2004). "Edmund I". Oxford Dictionary of National Biography (online ed.). Oxford University Press. doi:10.1093/ref:odnb/8514. (Subscription, Wikipedia Library access or UK public library membership required.)

Regnal titles
Preceded by Æthelred the Unready	King of the English; 1016	Succeeded by Cnut
