= Morcar (thegn) =

Thane of King Æthelred the Unready

Morcar was given land in Derbyshire in 1009

Morcar (or Morkere) (Old English: Mōrcǣr) (died 1015) was a thane (minister) of King Æthelred the Unready. He was given lands in Derbyshire in 1009, including Weston-on-Trent, Crich, and Smalley by King Æthelred in 1011 and 1012. He was also given the freedom from the three common burdens. He and his brother Sigeferth were murdered in 1015 by Eadric Streona and their lands seized by the king. Sigeferth's widow was sent to Malmesbury Abbey, but the future King Edmund Ironside rescued her from her confinement and married her.

== Biography ==
Morcar was the son of Earngrim, according to John of Worcester, and his brother was Sigeferth. He was mentioned in the will of Wulfric Spot, brother of Ælfhelm and son of Wulfrun. In 1004, when Wulfric died, he made Morcar a major beneficiary, along with Burton Abbey and Ælfhelm.

Morcar was a king's thegn (Latin minister) in 1009 when King Æthelred the Unready issued a charter, in which he gave lands to his minister Morcar. The charter shows that he would control the crossings of the River Trent at Weston-on-Trent, Wilne, and King's Mills in Leicestershire. Although not mentioned explicitly, the land described at Weston on Trent included ownership of what is now the villages of Shardlow and Aston-on-Trent.

The river crossings at Weston, King's Mill, and Wilne control one of the main routes for travelers moving up or down England, as this river was a boundary within Mercia. The Domesday Book also used the river as a boundary between counties later that century.

The land that Morcar received was listed as eight hides at Weston upon Trent and a hide each at Morley, Smalley, Ingleby, Crich, and Kidsley. This land was given to Morcar, the King's chief minister, and he was given rights that were normally reserved for the King alone. He was given the responsibility for all types of justice and exemption from the Trinoda necessitas. The threefold tax of Trinoda necessitas usually required an obligation on the land to surrender soldiers, to repair fortifications, and to repair bridges. Morcar alone could decide a fate of life or death without the need of the authority of the King or his sheriff. Morcar was given further lands in Derbyshire. In 1011, he was given five hides at what was possibly Mickleover and in 1012, two more at Eckington.

== Death ==
These land grants again came under the control of King Æthelred when Morcar and his brother, Sigeferth, were murdered by Eadric in 1015. Williams speculates that Morcar may have been involved in swinging support in Northumbria behind Sweyn Forkbeard, who was King of Denmark.

King Æthelred seized both Morcar's and Sigeferth's lands and imprisoned Sigeferth's widow, who was called Ealdgyth. King Edmund Ironside then freed the widow and married her. Edmund redistributed some of the lands that had previously belonged to Sigeferth.

== Primary sources ==
- Anglo-Saxon Charters
  - S 922 (AD 1009). Archive: Burton Abbey. Available from anglo-saxons.net and The British Academy.
  - S 924 (AD 1011). Archive: Burton Abbey.
  - S 1536 (AD 1002 x 1004), will of Wulfric. Archive: Burton Abbey.
  - S 1503 (AD 1014), will of Æthelstan, the ætheling. Archive: Christ Church, Canterbury, and Old Minster, Winchester.

== Secondary sources ==
- Williams, Ann. 2003. Æthelred the Unready: The Ill-Counselled King. London. ISBN 1-85285-382-4
- Faith, Rosamund J. 1997. The English Peasantry and the Growth of Lordship. London.
