= Godwine Porthund =

Godwine Porthund was listed in the Anglo-Saxon Chronicle as a butcher ("carnifex") of Shrewsbury in 1006. Ælfhelm, Ealdorman of York had been invited to a feast with Eadric Streona, who took him hunting in the forest where he was ambushed by Godwine Porthund and assassinated. Subsequently, King Æthelred the Unready had the eyes of Ælfhelm's sons Wulfheah and Ufegeat gouged out at Cookham. In 1017 Eadric was executed by King Canute (Ælfhelm's son in law).
