= Wulfrun =

Mercian noblewoman (c. 935-c. 1005)

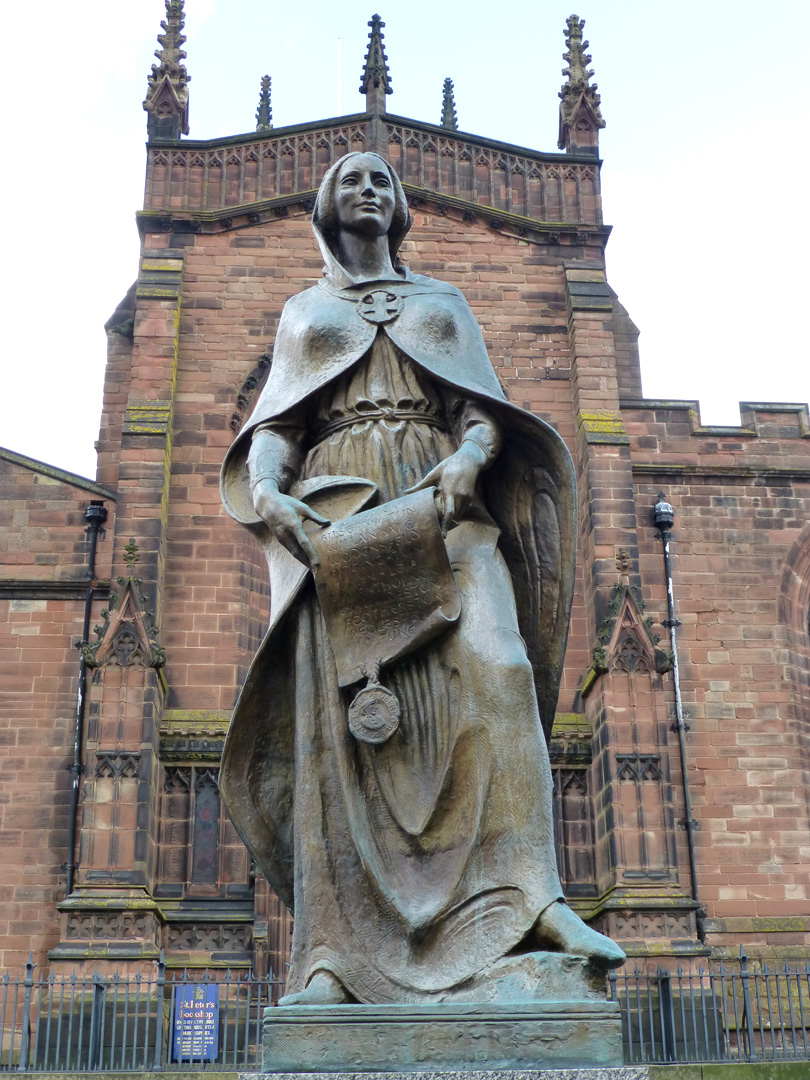
- Charles Wheeler's statue of Lady Wulfrun at St Peter's Church, Wolverhampton
- Born: c. 935; Mercia
- Died: c. 1005 (aged roughly 70) possibly Tamworth, Mercia (now Staffordshire)
- Burial place: possibly Tamworth
- Other name: Wulfruna
- Occupations: Landowner, noblewoman
- Years active: before 990s-1005
- Known for: The person who endowed St Peter's Collegiate Church and having a close connection to the founding of the city of Wolverhampton
- Children: 2 sons (Wulfric Spot & Ælfhelm of York)

Wulfrun(a) (c. 935-c. 1005) was a Mercian noblewoman and landowner who held estates in Staffordshire.

Today she is particularly remembered for her association with Hēatūn, Anglo-Saxon for "high or principal farm or enclosure", which she was granted in a charter by King Æthelred II (Æthelred the Unready) in 985, and where she endowed a collegiate church by 994. By 1070 this had become known as Wolvrenehamptonia – Wolfrun's heaton – now the city of Wolverhampton, the sixth largest district by population in the West Midlands.

== Biography ==
She was born around 935 in Mercia and she seems to have also had a close connection with Tamworth, the main centre of royal power in Mercia at the time. It was from here that according to the Anglo-Saxon Chronicle she was abducted by Danes in 943. Later her son Wulfric Spot left to his daughter the lordship of an estate there that was "not to be subject to any service nor to any man born", that he may have inherited from Wulfrun; and it is believed that she was buried with the religious community there, to which Wulfric also left land.

Her son Wulfric "Spot" became one of the king's principal thegns in the 990s and an even more extensive landowner than his mother, with holdings in Derbyshire, western Warwickshire, the territories "between the Ribble and the Mersey", Northumbria, and seven other English counties as well as his inheritance in Staffordshire by the time of his death circa 1002-1004. In his will, which survives, he endowed much of his land to re-found Burton Abbey. Another son, Ælfhelm, was made ealdorman of Northumbria, in practice southern Northumbria (the area around York), from about 994 until his death in 1006. His daughter Ælfgifu would go on to be married to Cnut, future king of England, in the wake of his father Sweyn Forkbeard's invasion of England in 1013. Ælfgifu later played a key role in securing the throne for her son Harold Harefoot in 1036. Wulfrun is known to have also had at least one other child: Wulfric's will contains bequests to the daughter of a sister, Ælfthryth, who had apparently died before the will was written in 1002.

Her exact death date is unknown, but a reference however can be found in a charter to Ensham Monastery dating to 1005 which states that Wulfrun bequested land at Ramsey (now located in Cambridgeshire), being "at her last breath", indicating that she died shortly after the charter was written, sometime in 1005, although a now outdated source states that she died in Tamworth in 995 or 996, although she was probably alive until 1005.

Her lands may have been inherited from Wulfsige the Black, who was granted lands by King Edmund in 942, some of which correspond with lands later endowed by Wulfrun, and some with lands described in the will of her son Wulfric. Wulfsige may thus have been her father.

== Sources ==
Contemporary knowledge of her comes from several text sources:

- Year 943 entry in the Anglo-Saxon Chronicle says that Vikings seized her when they took the fort at Tamworth. [It was in all probability to obtain a ransom.]
- Listed as a witness in an Anglo-Saxon charter dated 985, which is listed as no. 650 in Kemble's Codex Diplomaticus Ævi . In it King Ethelred II ('Ethelred the Unready'), granted to Wulfrun ten hides of land at Hēatūn, which means "high or principal farm or enclosure".
- It is recorded that in 994 Wulfrun gave ten hides of land to endow a church at a place called Heantune (dative case). This may be the same land as in the previous entry. The church had previously been founded as an abbey by Wulfere.
- The West Midlands placename Wolverhampton seems to have come from Anglo-Saxon Wulfrūnehēantūn = "Wulfrūn's high or principal enclosure or farm", though a local tradition says that King Wulfhere of Mercia was involved in the founding of the town, the church, or both. Older forms of the town's name run against this hypothesis. Many buildings and firms in Wolverhampton are named after Wulfrun, for example, The Wulfrun Centre, Lady Wulfrun (formerly "The Goose in the city" pub), Wulfrun Hall and the Wulfrun Hotel.

It is thought probable that these references all refer to the same woman, Lady Wulfrun. The "a" commonly seen at the end of her name is a Latinisation.

=== Description of Wulfrun's abduction (943) ===
The relevant Anglo-Saxon Chronicle entries are (from the Worcester manuscript):-

- 941: Her Norðhymbra alugon hira getreowaða ⁊ Anlaf of Yrlande him to cinge gecuron.
- 943: Her Anlaf abræc Tamewurþe, ⁊ micel wæl gefeol on ægþra hand, ⁊ þa Denan sige ahton, ⁊ micele herehuþe mid him aweglæddon, þær wæs Wulfrun genumen on þære hergunge. Her Eadmund cyning ymbsæt Anlaf cyning ⁊ Wulfstan arcebiscop on Legraceastre, ⁊ he hy gewyldan meahte, nære þæt hi on niht ut ne ætburston of þære byrig, ⁊ æfter þæm begeat Anlaf Eadmundes cynges freondscipe, ⁊ se cyning Eadmund onfeng þa Anlafe cyninge æt fulwihte, ⁊ he him cynelice gyfode. ⁊ ðy ilcan geare ymbe tæla mycelne fyrst he onfeng Regnalde cyninge æt bisceopes handa.
- 941: Here the Northumbrians belied their promises and chose Olaf from Ireland as king.
- 943: Here Olaf broke down Tamworth and great slaughter fell on either side, and the Danes had the victory and led away great war-booty with them. There Wulfrun was taken in that raid. Here king Edmund besieged Olaf and archbishop Wulfstan in Leicester, and he might have controlled them, except that they broke out of the fort in the night, and after that Olaf had king Edmund's friendship, and king Edmund received king Olaf at baptism, and gave to him royally. And in the same year after a fairly long time he received Rægnald at a bishop's hands.
