= Wulfric Spot =

Anglo-Saxon nobleman (died c. 1004)

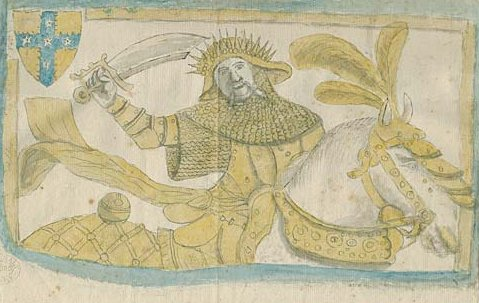
- An 18th-century pencil sketch of a stained glass window in Abbots Bromley depicting Wulfric, the original held by the William Salt Library, Stafford
- Died: c. 1004 (on 22 October, according to later tradition) possibly in the battle of Ringmere
- Resting place: cloister of Burton Abbey
- Years active: floruit 980s until death
- Known for: landed wealth, patronage of Burton Abbey, Anglo-Saxon will
- Title: thegn (minister, charters), consul and comes (Burton Abbey Chronicle)
- Children: daughter of unknown name
- Parent: Wulfrun (mother)
- Relatives: Ælfhelm of York (brother); Ælfthryth (sister); Wulfric the Black; Ælfgifu of Northampton (niece), Morcar (nephew)

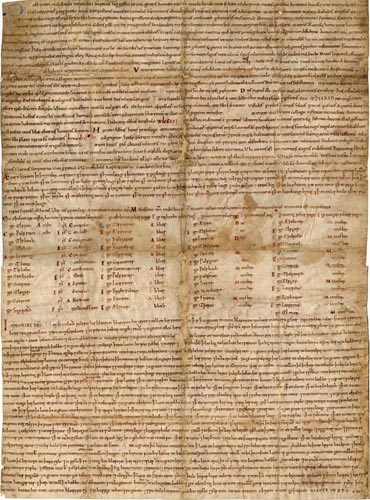
Confirmation of the will of Wulfric Spot, charter of Æthelred the Unready to Burton Abbey, AD 1004

Wulfric (died c. 1004), called Wulfric Spot or Spott, was an Anglo-Saxon nobleman. His will is an important document from the reign of King Æthelred the Unready. Wulfric was a patron of the Burton Abbey, around which the modern town of Burton on Trent later grew up, and may have refounded the Benedictine monastery there.

== Family ==
He was one of the three known children of the noblewoman Wulfrun, after whom Wolverhampton is named. Wulfric's family was linked with the Wulfsige the Black to whom King Edmund I granted land in Staffordshire. As much of Wulfric the Black's estate was granted to Wolverhampton by Wulfrun, and other parts, including lands around modern Abbots Bromley passed to Wulfric, it is possible that Wulfric the Black was this Wulfric's maternal grandfather. The family was related to the Wulfgeat who is a witness to charters in the reign of King Edgar and received lands in Staffordshire and Gloucestershire from the king. Of Wulfric's father and his paternal kin nothing is known.

Wulfric's brother was Ælfhelm, Ealdorman of York or Northumbria from 993 until he was killed in 1006. Ælfhelm was the father of King Cnut's first wife Ælfgifu of Northampton, mother of King Svein of Norway and King Harold Harefoot of England. Ælfhelm also had two sons, Wulfheah and Ufegeat, who were blinded when he was killed. Their sister was Ælfthryth whose daughter Ealdgyth married Morcar, killed in 1015 along with his brother Sigeferth on the orders of King Æthelred. Ælfthryth appears to have died before Wulfric's will was written.

Wulfric's byname, Spot, while it may have the same sense as in modern English, that is that it referred to some form of mark on his face, could also indicate a short, fat person. He is not called 'Spot' before the 13th century.

== Career ==
The Burton Abbey chronicle describes Wulfric as consul ac comes Merciorum, that is consul and 'count' of the Mercians, perhaps suggesting that he was an ealdorman. More contemporary sources disagree and he is generally described as a minister, that is a thegn, although his position may have been more like that of a hold in more Scandinavianised districts of England, somewhere between that of a thegn and an ealdorman.

Little is known of Wulfric's life, but his will, approved while he was still living or shortly after his death by King Æthelred, shows him to have been exceptionally wealthy. He owned lands in ten counties of the English midlands, as well as further lands in the unshired lands between the River Ribble and the River Mersey. The lands which he had owned "between Ribble and Mersey" alone were assessed as having been worth 145 pounds in 1066 by the compilers of the Domesday Book.

== Offspring and patronage ==
Wulfric appears to have had no sons, or none who survived him, as his will does not name any. His daughter, whose name is unknown, was left lands around Tamworth. Sawyer notes that Wulfric had special rights over these lands, "not to be subject to any service nor to any man born", rights which his daughter inherited. His god-daughter, his brother, nephews and niece were also beneficiaries of his will. King Æthelred, in line with custom, received lands, monies, weapons and horses. Large sums of money were given to the archbishops, bishops, abbots and abbesses of England. A monastery at Tamworth received land. The principal beneficiary of Wulfric's will, however, was the abbey of Byrtun, modern Burton on Trent.

There was said to have been a monastic foundation at Burton in earlier times, with which the 7th-century Saint Modwenna is associated. This appears, along with many others, to have disappeared in the Viking Age, and the monastery there was probably reestablished by Wulfric. The new abbey was dedicated to Saint Benedict of Nursia and followed the Rule of Saint Benedict. According to the cartulary of Burton, which may not be reliable, Wulfric left the abbey all of the lands he inherited from his father. As well as the substantial lands he left to Burton in his will, Wulfric, like many noble founders of monasteries, had written into it other clauses to ensure that the new abbey, which was to pray for his soul and for that of his mother, would be provided with powerful friends. He left additional lands to Ælfric of Abingdon, the Archbishop of Canterbury, with the understanding that Ælfric would be a friend and ally to the monks. Wulfric also sought to involve the king in his new foundation, giving over his proprietarial rights to Æthelred, who in turn agreed that he would be lord and protector of Burton Abbey.

== Death ==
Although some late sources places Wulfric's death as late as 1010, and John of Worcester's chronicle has been read as suggesting that he died at the battle of Ringmere in that year, he probably died between 1002, when his will was begun, and 1004, when King Æthelred issued his charter approving it. He was buried in the cloister of Burton alongside his wife. In later times Burton Abbey marked the occasion of his death on 22 October.
