= Cnut's invasion of England =

1016 Danish conquest of England

Coordinates: 51°28′43″N 0°18′25″W

Cnut the Great's Invasion of England
- Part of the Viking Invasions of England
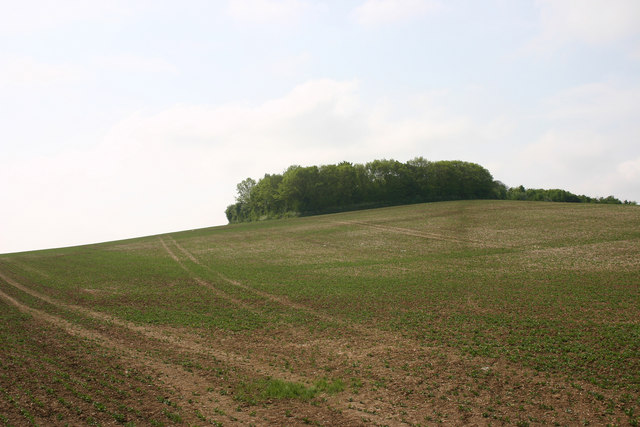
- Ashingdon hill, possible location of the battle of Assandun
Date	September 1015 - November 1016 (One year and two months)
Location	England
Result	Cnut's victory
Territorial changes	Edmund Ironside cedes all of England, save Wessex, to Cnut.; Following Edmund's death on 30 November, Cnut ascends to the throne as the sole king of England.

Belligerents
Kingdom of Denmark	Kingdom of England

Commanders and leaders
Cnut the Great; Thorkell the Tall; Eadric Streona; Eiríkr Hákonarson	Edmund II (surrendered); Ælfric of Hampshire †; Ulfcytel Snillingr †

Strength
160 ships according to the Anglo-Saxon chronicle 10,000 men and 200 ships-according to the sagas	Unknown

Casualties and losses
Unknown	Heavy

In the autumn of 1016, the Danish prince Cnut the Great (Canute), supported by Eiríkr Hákonarson, and Thorkell the Tall successfully invaded England. Cnut's father, Sweyn Forkbeard, had previously conquered and briefly ruled England for less than five weeks.

== Background ==
Sweyn Forkbeard conquered England by 1013, forcing King Æthelred of England to exile by the end of the year. However, Sweyn died on 2 February 1014, and the Danes proclaimed his son, Cnut, as king. Meanwhile, the English nobility recalled Æthelred, who went on to successfully expel the Danes by the summer of 1014. That same summer Æthelred's eldest son, Æthelstan died, leaving his younger brother, Edmund, as heir to the English throne.

Cnut wasted no time to prepare for the reconquest. Among the allies of Denmark was Bolesław I the Brave the duke of Poland, (later crowned king) a relative to the Danish royal house. He lent some Polish troops, likely to have been a pledge made to Cnut and his brother Harald when, in the winter, they "went amongst the Wends" to fetch their mother back to the Danish court. She had been sent away by their father after the death of the Swedish king Eric the Victorious in 995, and his marriage to Sigrid the Haughty, the Swedish queen mother. This wedlock formed a strong alliance between the successor to the throne of Sweden, Olof Skötkonung, and the rulers of Denmark, his in-laws. Swedes were certainly among the allies in the English conquest. Another in-law to the Danish royal house, Eiríkr Hákonarson, was the earl of Lade and the co-ruler of Norway with his brother Sweyn Haakonsson – Norway having been under Danish sovereignty since the Battle of Svolder, in 999. Eiríkr's participation in the invasion left his son Hakon to rule Norway. Thorkell the Tall, despite aiding the English in resisting Sweyn's invasion in 1013, swore to aid Cnut in Reconquering England.

In 1015, a great council convened in Oxford. During which, Eadric Streona, Æthelred's son-in-law and Ealdorman of Mercia, assassinated Sigeferth and Morcar, described as two of the most powerful thegns in England who ruled over the Five Boroughs. Following their deaths, Æthelred imprisoned Sigeferth's widow, Ealdgyth, in Malmesbury. In response, Edmund openly rebelled against his father. He freed Ealdgyth from imprisonment, married her, seized the lands of Sigeferth and Morcar, and by August launched a campaign in the Five Boroughs against his father.

== Invasion ==
In September 1015, Cnut's fleet set sail for England with a Scandinavian army of 10,000 in 200 longships Cnut was at the head of an array of warriors from all over Scandinavia. The invading army was composed primarily of mercenaries.

According to the Peterborough Chronicle manuscript, one of the major witnesses of the Anglo-Saxon Chronicle, early in September 1015 Cnut came into Sandwich, and straightway sailed around Kent to Wessex, until he came to the mouth of the Frome, and harried in Dorset and Wiltshire and Somerset, beginning a campaign of an intensity not seen since the days of Alfred the Great. A passage from Queen Emma's Encomium provides a picture of Cnut's fleet:

[T]here were there so many kinds of shields, that you could have believed that troops of all nations were present. ... Gold shone on the prows, silver also flashed on the variously shaped ships. ... For who could look upon the lions of the foe, terrible with the brightness of gold, who upon the men of metal, menacing with golden face, ... who upon the bulls on the ships threatening death, their horns shining with gold, without feeling any fear for the king of such a force? Furthermore, in this great expedition, there was present no slave, no man freed from slavery, no low-born man, no man weakened by age; for all were noble, all strong with the might of mature age, all sufficiently fit for any type of fighting, all of such great fleetness, that they scorned the speed of horsemen.

— Encomium Emmae Reginae

For the remainder of 1015, the Scandinavian army ravaged southern England. Æthelred, who was gravely ill and staying at Cosham, was unable to lead. Meanwhile, Cnut was gaining hostages and support from many members of the nobility. Eadric Streona and Edmund each raised separate armies to oppose the invading army. Although their forces eventually joined, Eadric unsuccessfully attempted to assassinate Edmund, causing the armies to separate. Following this, Eadric betrayed the English cause, persuading 40 ships from the royal fleet to defect and join Cnut. In late December the war shifted north, with Wessex subdued the Scandinavian army marched across the River Thames at Cricklade into Mercia, pillaging and burning Warwickshire. Edmund had been waiting in the east with his army and had planned to attack the Scandinavians, However, the Mercians under his command refused to engage the Danish host in battle unless they were joined by King Æthelred and the Londoners. As a result, the army was disbanded.

Edmund managed to levy a larger force and sent messengers to London, urging his father to lead it. Æthelred levied an army of his own, and the two forces united. However, fearing betrayal, Æthelred disbanded the combined army once again.

Edmund then traveled with the remnants of his army to Northumbria, where he joined forces with his brother-in-law, Uhtred the bold, the Ealdorman of Northumbria. Together they ravaged lands that belonged to Eadric, including Staffordshire, Shropshire, and Leicestershire. On the other side, Cnut ravaged Buckinghamshire, Bedfordshire, Huntingdonshire, Northamptonshire, Lincolnshire, Nottinghamshire, and afterwards, Northumbria. Uhtred seems to have abandoned Edmund's cause, and hastened north to surrender to Cnut, but at the instigation of Cnut he was murdered by Thurbrand the Hold possibly due to a vendetta.

Edmund returned south to London, where Aethelred died on the 23rd of April. The English nobility present in London, most notable among them being Aelfric of Hampshire and Ulfcytel Snilling, elected Edmund king, while the rest of the nobility meeting in Southampton, declared their allegiance to Cnut. Edmund hastened to Wessex to levy an army while the Danes laid siege to London on the 7th of May.

They dug a broad ditch on the south side of the Thames, and dragged their ships to the west of the bridge. They then surrounded the city with a broad and deep trench so as to cut off all ingress and egress and made frequent assaults on it. But the citizens resisting manfully drove them to a distance from the walls. Therefore raising the siege for the present. - John of Worcester

Upon learning of Edmund's levying of the fyrds in Wessex, they did a forced-march west, where they were intercepted by the English army at the dense woodland of Selwood

== Battle of Penselwood ==
The battle was fought sometime between mid-May and midsummer.

The English army led by Edmund routed Cnut's army near the village of Penselwood. The battle is omitted in Scandinavian sources.

== Battle of Sherston ==
The Battle of Sherston was fought after midsummer between the English led by Edmund Ironside and the Scandinavian army. Sources on the outcome of the battle conflict, John of Worcester records this as a victory for the English while the Encomium Emmae Reginae, citing Thorkell the Tall as heading the Scandinavian army, claims otherwise.

After the battle, The Scandinavians returned to besiege London, while Edmund levied a larger army. The Londoners managed to hold on long enough for Edmund to raise the siege, and two days afterwards the two armies fought again at Brentford.

== Battle of Brentford ==
The Battle of Brentford was fought in 1016 some time between mid June (the approximate date of the battle of sherston) and October (the approximate date of the later Battle of Otford (1016)) between the English and the Scandinavians.

The English were victorious in this battle, but suffered great casualties, for many of them drowned in the Thames.

"Then collected he [Edmund] his force the third time, and went to London, all by north of the Thames, and so out through Clayhanger, and relieved the citizens, driving the enemy to their ships. It was within two nights after that the king went over at Brentford; where he fought with the enemy, and put them to flight: but there many of the English were drowned, from their own carelessness; who went before the main army with a design to plunder.(Anglo-Saxon Chronicle)"

After the battle Edmund returned to Wessex to compensate for his losses, while Cnut took this as an opportunity to yet again besiege London, but he suffered too many casualties and retreated into Mercia to plunder.

== Battle of Otford ==
The battle of Otford was fought near the village of Otford in Kent. The Scandinavians were routed and were chased by the English into the Isle of Sheppey.

According to the Anglo-Saxon Chronicle, this was when Eadric switched his allegiance back to the English, and he allegedly convinced Edmund not to attack the Scandinavians at Aylesford.

== Battle of Assandun ==
The Battle of Assandun (or Essendune) was fought between the two armies on 18 October 1016. There is disagreement whether Assandun may be Ashdon near Saffron Walden in north Essex or, as long supposed, Ashingdon near Rochford in southeast Essex, England.

The battle was victory for the Scandinavians, led by Canute the Great, who triumphed over the English army led by King Edmund Ironside. In the midst of battle, Eadric Streona, whose return to the English side had perhaps only been a ruse, withdrew his forces from the fray, bringing about a decisive English defeat.

The battle is described in the Anglo-Saxon chronicle as follows:

“When the king understood that the army was up, then he collected the fifth time all the English nation, and went behind them, and overtook them in Essex, on the hill called Assingdon; where they fiercely came together. Then did Alderman Edric as he often did before—he first began the flight with the Maisevethians and so betrayed his natural lord and all the people of England. There Knute had the victory, though all England fought against him! There was then slain Bishop Ednoth, and Abbot Wulsy, and Alderman Elfric, and Alderman Godwin of Lindsey, and Ulfkytel of East-Anglia, and Ethelward, the son of Alderman Ethelsy. And all the nobility of the English nation was there undone!” - Anglo-Saxon Chronicle

The battle is mentioned briefly in Knýtlinga saga which quotes a verse of skaldic poetry by Óttarr svarti, one of Cnut's court poets.

King Knut fought the third battle, a major one, against the sons of Æthelred at a place called Ashingdon, north of the Danes' Woods. In the words of Ottar:

At Ashingdon, you worked well
in the shield-war, warrior-king;
brown was the flesh of bodies
served to the blood-bird:
in the slaughter, you won,
sire, with your sword
enough of a name there,
north of the Danes' Woods.

During the course of the battle, Eädnoth the Younger, Bishop of Dorchester, was killed by Cnut's men whilst in the act of saying mass on behalf of Edmund Ironside's men. According to Liber Eliensis, Eadnoth's hand was first cut off for a ring, and then his body cut to pieces. Ulfcytel Snillingr and Aelfric of Hampshire also died in the battle.

== Treaty of Olney ==
After his defeat at Assandun, Edmund fled westwards, and Cnut pursued him into Gloucestershire, with another battle probably fought near the Forest of Dean, for Edmund had an alliance with some of the Welsh. On an island called Olney near Deerhurst, Cnut and Edmund convinced by the nobility, met to negotiate terms of peace. Some sources claim that Edmund challenged Cnut to a Holmgang, but the latter refused.

It was agreed that all of England north of the Thames was to be the domain of the Danish king, while all to the south was kept by the English king, along with London. It was agreed by both kings that accession to the reign of the entire realm was set to pass to whomever outlived the other, although no such agreement is mentioned in contemporary sources. These events are described in the Anglo-Saxon chronicle

“After this fight went King Knute up with his army into Gloucestershire, where he heard that King Edmund was. Then advised Alderman Edric, and the counsellors that were there assembled, that the kings should make peace with each other, and produce hostages. Then both the kings met together at Olney, south of Deerhurst, and became allies and sworn brothers. There they confirmed their friendship both with pledges and with oaths, and settled the pay of the army. With this covenant they parted: King Edmund took to Wessex, and Knute to Mercia and the northern district. The army then went to their ships with the things they had taken; and the people of London made peace with them, and purchased their security, whereupon they brought their ships to London, and provided themselves winter-quarters therein. On the feast of St. Andrew died King Edmund; and he is buried with his grandfather Edgar at Glastonbury”

Edmund died on the 30th of November, within weeks of the arrangement. Contemporary sources do not give a cause of death, some suggest he succumbed to wounds received in battle. Adam of Bremen writing c. 1080 claims Edmund was poisoned, while William of Malmesbury writing c. 1140 claims the cause of his death is unknown, but brings up a “rumor” that he was assassinated while sitting on a toilet.

== Aftermath ==
With the death of Edmund Ironside, Cnut became the sole ruler of England. He exiled Edmund's two baby boys to Sweden, to be killed by King Olöf Skotkonung, but he secretly spared their lives and sent them to the Kiev, where his daughter was queen there.

Cnut rewarded his commanders with lands, Thorkell received East Anglia, Eirikr Northumbria, and Eadric Mercia, however he was later beheaded by orders of Cnut on Christmas Day of 1017.

Cnut built a church, chapel or holy site near the field of assandun to commemorate the soldiers who died in battle. A few years later in 1020 the completion took place of the memorial church known as Ashingdon Minster, on the hill next to the presumed site of the battle in Ashingdon. The church still stands to this day. Cnut attended the dedication of Ashingdon Minster with his bishops and appointed his personal priest, Stigand, to be priest there. The church is now dedicated to Saint Andrew but is believed previously to have been dedicated to Saint Michael, who was considered a military saint: churches dedicated to him are frequently located on a hill.

== Sources ==
- Campbell, Alistair, ed. (1998), Encomium Emmae Reginae, London: Cambridge University
- Lawson, M. K. (2004), Cnut: England's Viking King (2nd ed.), Stroud: Tempus, ISBN 0-7524-2964-7, archived from the original on 14 April 2023
- Trow, M. J. (2005), Cnut – Emperor of the North, Stroud: Sutton, ISBN 0-7509-3387-9
