= Æthelric =

Æthelric (also: Aethelric or Ethelric) is a masculine Anglo-Saxon name that may refer to:

- Æthelric (bishop of Dorchester) (died 1034), Bishop of Dorcester
- Æthelric (bishop of Durham) (fl. 1042–1072), Bishop of Durham, once thought to have been an archbishop of York
- Æthelric (bishop of Sherborne) (fl. c. 1001–c. 1011), Bishop of Sherborne
- Æthelric of Bernicia (fl. 568–572), King of Bernicia
- Æthelric of Deira (fl. c. 589/599–c. 604), King of Deira
- Æthelric of Hwicce (fl. 692–736), King of Hwicce
- Æthelric son of Æthelmund (fl. 804–after 804), Ealdorman of Hwicce
- Æthelric I (fl. c. 1032–1038), Bishop of Selsey
- Æthelric II (fl. c. 1058–c. 1076), Bishop of Selsey
