= Ælfhelm of York =

10th and 11th-century Ealdorman of Northumbria

Ælfhelm (died 1006) was the ealdorman of Northumbria, in practice southern Northumbria (the area around York), from about 994 until his death. An ealdorman (or earl) was a senior nobleman who governed a province—a shire or group of shires—on behalf of the king. Ælfhelm's powerful and wealthy family came from Mercia, a territory and former kingdom incorporating most of central England, and he achieved his position despite being an outsider. Ælfhelm first appears in charters as dux ("ealdorman") in about 994.

Most of Ælfhelm's subsequent historical appearances record him as a witness to charters, although one notable exception is the will of his brother, Wulfric Spot. According to a 12th-century tradition, Ælfhelm was murdered and his sons blinded in 1006, by Eadric Streona with the connivance of King Æthelred II. Ælfhelm's daughter, Ælfgifu, married Cnut the Great, King of England between 1016 and 1035, as a result of which Ælfhelm became the grandfather of future English king Harold Harefoot.

== Origins ==
Ælfhelm was a Mercian, son of Wulfrun, a rich noblewoman who founded Burton Abbey. His father is unknown, but it is thought that he was of lower rank than Wulfrun as Wulfric Spot, Ælfhelm's brother, is called "Wulfric son of Wulfrun", suggesting that his status derived mainly from his mother. Wulfric Spot founded Burton Abbey, but little is known about Ælfhelm's sister, Ælfthryth.

Wulfrun also founded the Minster of St Mary's at Wolverhampton, a settlement which took her name ("Wulfrun's chief settlement"). Her earliest association is with Tamworth, when she is mentioned as the only hostage taken when the place was seized by Olaf Guthfrithson in 940. It is thought that her lands were mostly in Staffordshire, while most of Wulfric Spot's lands were in Staffordshire, Derbyshire, and western Warwickshire.

== Ealdorman of southern Northumbria ==
Ælfhelm begins witnessing charters as dux, i.e. ealdorman, in 994. He was thought by historian Simon Keynes to have been the same as Prosopography of Anglo-Saxon England (PASE) "Ælfhelm 15", who witnesses charters as minister, i.e. thegn, from 982 to 990. Charter appearances earlier, during the reign of Edgar the Peaceable, are possible, but it is impossible to show definitively that earlier thegns with the name Ælfhelm are the same as the future ealdorman of southern Northumbria, the latter only being positively identifiable by his title, dux.

Ælfhelm's apparent promotion in 994 is thought by some historians, for instance Richard Fletcher, to have been due to the Scandinavian attack on Northumbria in 993. Under the year 993, the Anglo-Saxon Chronicle relates that Vikings had invaded Northumbria and sacked Bamburgh, whereupon the southern English raised an army:

Bamburgh was sacked and much booty was captured there, and after that the army came to the mouth of the Humber and did great damage there, both in the Kingdom of Lindsey and in Northumbria. Then a very large English army was collected, and when they should have joined battle, the leaders Fræna, Godwine and Frythegyst, first started the flight.

Fletcher speculated that Ælfhelm's predecessor Thored, who disappeared from the records at this time, was removed from office and replaced by Ælfhelm by King Æthelred II as a result of his failure against the Scandinavians. Another historian, William Kapelle, believed Thored was removed because of his Scandinavian descent, an argument based on the Worcester Chronicle's claim, added to the text borrowed from the Anglo-Saxon Chronicle, that Fræna, Godwine and Frythegyst fled because "they were Danish on their father's side".

== Wulfric Spot's will ==
Ælfhelm's brother, Wulfric Spot, left a will written in Old English, which provides many of the details we know about Ælfhelm. For instance, it gives the names of his two sons, Wulfheah and Ufegeat. It dates to between 1002 and 1004, and survives in a 12th-century manuscript.

Wulfric granted the lands "between the Ribble and the Mersey, and in the Wirral" to Ælfhelm and his son Wulfheah, on condition that they each pay Burton Abbey 3,000 shad at shad season. Wulfric left Ælfhelm Rolleston (Staffordshire), Harlaston (Staffordshire), and Conisbrough (Yorkshire), the last on condition that he gave Burton one third of the fish there. Wulfheah received Barlaston (Staffordshire), Marchington (Staffordshire), and Alvaston (Derbyshire), while Ælfhelm's other son Ufegeat was given Norton (Derbyshire) "in the hope that he may be a better friend and supporter of the monastery [of Burton]". Ælfhelm is asked to protect Burton Abbey and the possessions of Wulfric's daughter.

== Death and legacy ==
Little else is recorded about Ealdorman Ælfhelm's career before his death. Notice of the latter, with the blinding of his two sons, comes in the Anglo-Saxon Chronicle, which related under the year 1006:

In this year Archbishop Ælfric died and Bishop Ælfheah succeeded him to the archiepiscopal see. In the same year Wulfgeat was deprived of all his property, and Wulfheah and Ufegeat were blinded and Ealdorman Ælfhelm killed.

The Worcester Chronicle, which for this period consists of entries taken from the Anglo-Saxon Chronicle supplemented with extra information, gives an expanded saga-like version of this account, attributing Ælfhelm's death to Eadric Streona:

The crafty and treacherous Eadric Streona, plotting to deceive the noble ealdorman Ælfhelm, prepared a great feast for him at Shrewsbury at which, when he came as a guest, Eadric greeted him as if he were an intimate friend. But on the third or fourth day of the feast, when an ambush had been prepared, he took him into the wood to hunt. When all were busy with the hunt, one Godwine Porthund (which means the town dog) a Shrewsbury butcher, whom Eadric had dazzled long before with great gifts and many promises so that he might perpetrate the crime, suddenly leapt out from the ambush, and execrably slew the ealdorman Ælfhelm. After a short space of time his sons, Wulfheah and Ufegeat, were blinded, at King Æthelred’s command, at Cookham, where he himself was then staying.

This material in the Worcester Chronicle seems to have been part of a lost saga about Eadric Streona, not extant but used by various surviving 11th- and 12th-century sources. Kapelle thought Ælfhelm's murder, conducted without King Æthelred's displeasure, was the result of suspect loyalty in the face of Scandinavian invasions.

The sources appear to indicate that Ælfhelm's successor was Uhtred of Bamburgh, the first magnate in decades to govern northern and southern Northumbria together. The text known as De obsessione Dunelmi ("On the siege of Durham"), relates that Uhtred took power after defeating a Scottish invasion.

As well as his two sons Ælfhelm left a daughter, Ælfgifu of Northampton, by a lady named Wulfrun; Ælfgifu's territorial appellation is taken as further evidence that Ælfhelm had territory in the eastern Danelaw. At some time between 1013 and 1016, she married Cnut, son of Sweyn Forkbeard, future King of the English. Her son was Harold Harefoot, King of the English.

== Notes ==
Political offices
Preceded by Thored	Ealdorman of York c. 994–1006	Succeeded by Uhtred of Bamburgh
