= Burton Abbey =

Abbey in Staffordshire, England

Coordinates: 52.8005°N 1.6291°W

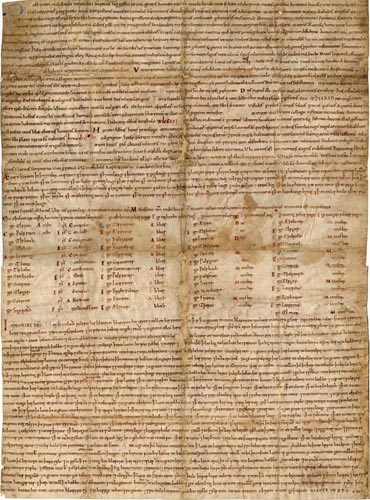
Charter of Æthelred the Unready to Burton Abbey, confirmation of the will of Wulfric Spot, AD 1004

Burton Abbey at Burton upon Trent in Staffordshire, England, was founded in the 7th or 9th century by St Modwen or Modwenna. It was refounded in 1003 as a Benedictine abbey by the thegn Wulfric Spott. He was known to have been buried in the abbey cloister in 1010, alongside the grave of his wife.

== History ==
Burton Abbey was mentioned in the Domesday Book when it was said to control lands in Mickleover, Appleby Magna in Leicestershire, Winshill and Stapenhill in Staffordshire, Coton in the Elms, Caldwell and Ticknall. The abbey itself was neither large nor wealthy and in 1310 its monks claimed it to be the smallest and poorest Benedictine monastery in England. It suffered frequent financial troubles throughout its existence, often due to mismanagement and outright criminal behaviour, although the situation seems to have been resolved by the 16th century.

In the 13th to 14th centuries there were around thirty monks in residence. This had fallen to almost half that number by the 1520s. Despite this, the monastery was nevertheless the most important in Staffordshire and by the 1530s had the highest revenue. The abbot was both a secular lord and, "exercised an independent spiritual jurisdiction. He was a figure of some standing, regularly serving on papal and royal commissions and acting as a collector of clerical taxes within the diocese." At various times between 1295 and 1322, the abbot was summoned to attend the Parliament of England, and again in 1532. It is also known that there were frequent Royal visits to the abbey, including those by William I, Henry II and Edward I.

== Annals ==
The Abbey's annals are an important source for thirteenth century political history, and the Abbey's major intellectual achievement.

== Dissolution and beyond ==
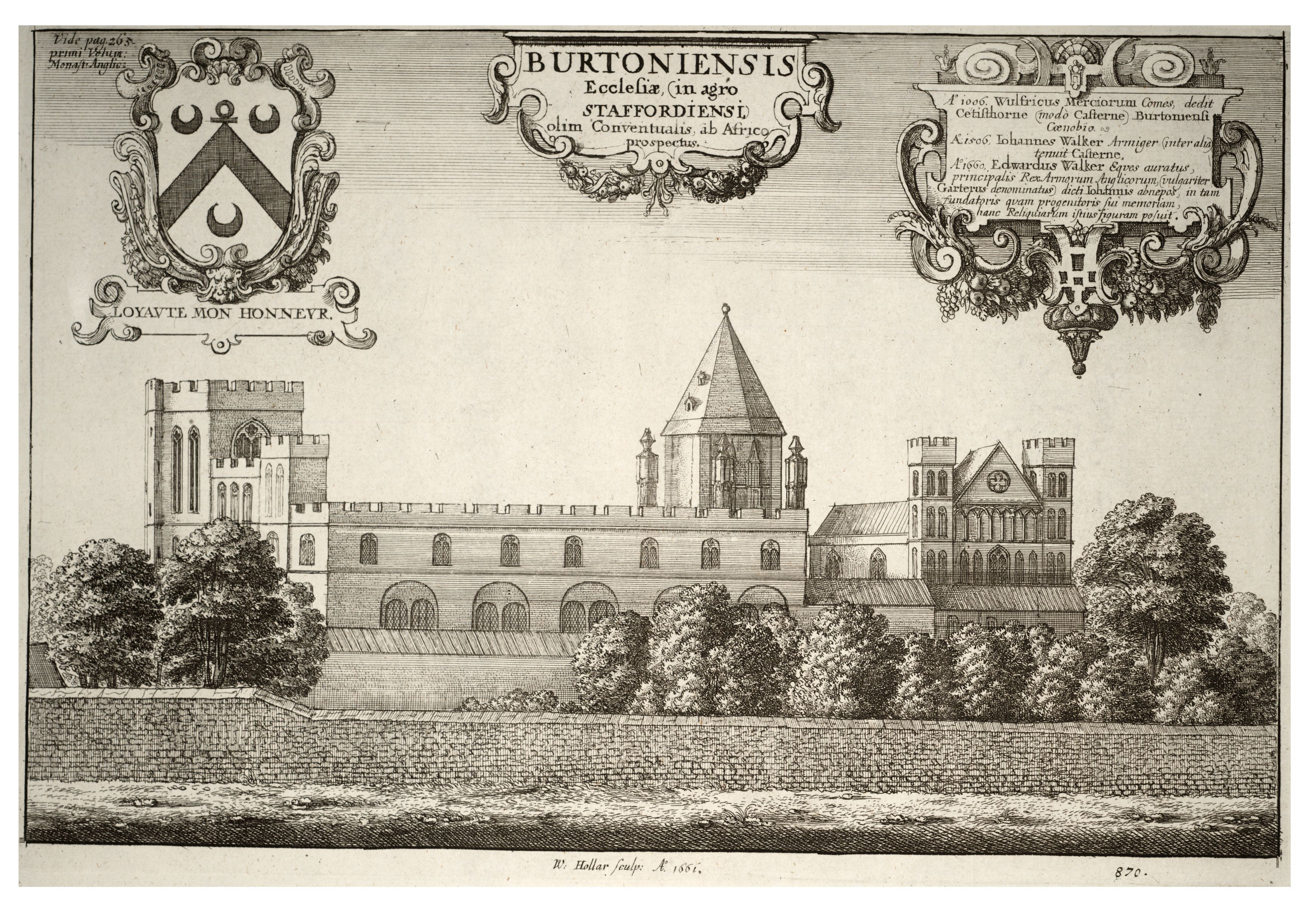
Etching of Burton Abbey church by Wenceslaus Hollar, 1661

The abbey was dissolved in 1539, to be refounded in 1541 as a college for a dean (who had been the last abbot) and four prebendaries. It was again dissolved in 1545 and granted to Sir William Paget.

Parts of the abbey church were retained for parish use. However, these were demolished and replaced by a new church, St Modwen's in 1719–28. Some fragments of the chapter house remain nearby, but little of the rest survives.

Two buildings were converted to residential use – a part known as the Manor House, and the former infirmary. The infirmary became known as The Abbey, and is now an Inn.

In around 1712 George Hayne opened the River Trent Navigation and leased the grounds of Burton Abbey to construct a wharf and other buildings in the precinct. This led to the development of Burton as the major town for brewing and exporting beer.

In 1967, contractors working on extensions to Burton Technical College uncovered two underground vaults which were thought to have been used as wine cellars. The larger of the two chambers was later used to house a student union disco named The Vault.

== Sources ==
=== Primary sources ===
- Dugdale, William (1846). Monasticon Anglicanum Volume III. archive.org.; includes Annals of Burton in Latin

=== Secondary sources ===
- G C Baugh, W L Cowie, J C Dickinson, Duggan A P, A K B Evans, R H Evans, Una C Hannam, P Heath, D A Johnston, Hilda Johnstone, Ann J Kettle, J L Kirby, R Mansfield and A Saltman. "Houses of Benedictine monks: The abbey of Burton," in A History of the County of Stafford: Volume 3, ed. M W Greenslade and R B Pugh (London: Victoria County History, 1970), 199-213. British History Online, accessed June 7, 2018, http://www.british-history.ac.uk/vch/staffs/vol3/pp199-213
- Anthony New. 'A Guide to the Abbeys of England And Wales', p90-92. Constable.
- "Burton-upon-Trent: General history," in A History of the County of Stafford: Volume 9, Burton-Upon-Trent, ed. Nigel J Tringham (London: Victoria County History, 2003), 5-20. British History Online, accessed June 8, 2018, http://www.british-history.ac.uk/vch/staffs/vol9/pp5-20.
