= Eadric Streona =

Anglo-Saxon noble (died 1017)

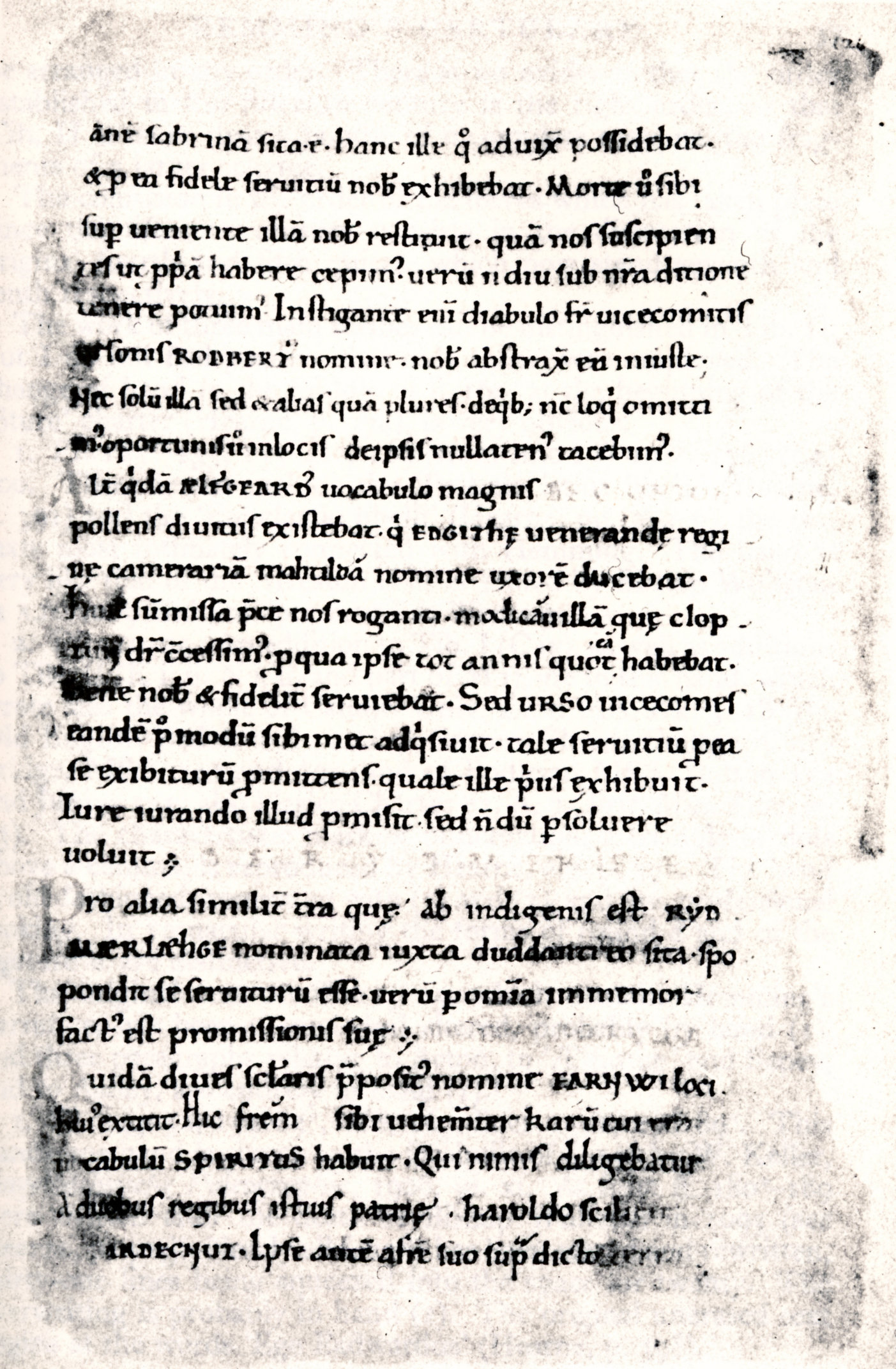
A page from Hemming's Cartulary, an 11th-century manuscript.

Eadric Streona (died 1017) was Ealdorman of Mercia from 1007 until he was killed by King Cnut. Eadric was given the epithet "Streona" (translated as "The Acquisitive”) in Hemming's Cartulary because he appropriated church land and funds for himself. Eadric became infamous in the Middle Ages because of his traitorous actions during the Danish conquest of England.

Eadric was one of at least eight children and had relatively humble beginnings: his father Ethelric attended the court of King Æthelred the Unready, but was of no great significance and is not known to have had any titles. Even before becoming an ealdorman, Eadric seems to have acted as Æthelred's enforcer; in 1006 he instigated the killing of the Ealdorman of York, Elfhelm. Eadric was married to Æthelred's daughter Eadgyth by 1009, thus becoming his son-in-law. Eadric was appointed Ealdorman of Mercia in 1007.

As an ealdorman, Eadric played an important role in the affairs of the kingdom. In 1009 he negotiated unsuccessfully with marauding Vikings to save the life of Archbishop Ælfheah of Canterbury. Eadric also continued to organise the killings of prominent nobles — supposedly upon orders of the king. However, he betrayed his father-in-law in 1015, joining the Dane Cnut, the son of Sweyn Forkbeard, against England.

Accompanying his new liege Cnut, Eadric went on a campaign of plundering throughout England until the summer of 1016, when a series of major battles were fought with Edmund Ironside, the eldest surviving son and successor of the deceased king Æthelred. The decisive battle was fought at Assandun on 18 October 1016. Eadric by that time had returned to his brother-in-law's side, but he fled the field with his men for uncertain reasons. Following a peace between Cnut and Edmund, Eadric was allowed to remain earl. Cnut had Eadric killed during Christmas festivities in London the following year.

== Name ==
Eadric's nickname "Streona" is loosely translated as the "Acquisitive" or the "Grasper" and first appears in Hemming's Cartulary.

== Early life ==
=== Family ===
Eadric's family appears to have had interests in Shropshire and Herefordshire. John of Worcester names Eadric's father as Æthelric, a thegn who attended court from the late 980s onwards, and his siblings as Brihtric, Ælfric, Goda, Æthelwine, Æthelweard, and Æthelmær, of whom the last is said (probably mistakenly) to have been the father of Wulfnoth Cild, who was the father of Earl Godwin. The chronicler also left a blank space between Ælfric and Goda, as if allowing for the name of another brother. Thegns bearing these names occur among the witnesses to the charters issued in the name of King Æthelred II in the late tenth and early eleventh centuries. These thegns occur quite often in groups of two or three, which might be interpreted as evidence that they were members of the same family. Æthelric seems to have been accompanied from the mid-990s onwards by one or more of his sons (not including Ælfric). Judging from the witness lists, it may be that the name of the other brother was Æthelnoth.

At some time before 1009 Eadric married Eadgyth (Edith), the daughter of King Æthelred. This was a political marriage, intended to strengthen alliances. Although instrumental in serving Æthelred for many years, Eadric ultimately ended up changing his allegiance several times, and betraying his wife's family. There is no record of Eadric and Eadgyth having any children, though it has been suggested that they had a daughter who was mother of Siward 'Grossus', a rich thegn of Shropshire.

=== Early career ===
Eadric himself is perhaps first identifiable in the witness lists of charters, along with his father and brother Brihtric, in 1002. Other members of Eadric's family seem to have been present at court in some strength in 1004–5; there are no lists in which Eadric appears in 1006, but Eadric was reported in that year for being involved in the killing of Ealdorman Ælfhelm. According to John of Worcester:

The crafty and treacherous Eadric Streona, plotting to deceive the noble Ealdorman Ælfhelm, prepared a great feast for him at Shrewsbury at which, when he came as a guest, Eadric greeted him as if he were an intimate friend. But on the third or fourth day of the feast, when an ambush had been prepared, he took him into the wood to hunt. When all were busy with the hunt, one Godwine Porthund (which means the town dog) a Shrewsbury butcher, whom Eadric had dazzled long before with great gifts and many promises so that he might perpetrate the crime, suddenly leapt out from the ambush, and execrably slew the ealdorman Ælfhelm. After a short space of time his sons, Wulfheah and Ufegeat, were blinded, at King Æthelred’s command, at Cookham, where he himself was then staying.

Eadric does appear among the thegns in 1007 at St Albans Abbey, in which year he was appointed Ealdorman of Mercia. It might have been in 1007, or thereabouts, that Eadric married Eadgyth, daughter of King Æthelred. This may either reflect or account for his sudden rise to prominence, since John of Worcester implies that the marriage had taken place by 1009.

== Ealdorman of Mercia ==
=== Tribute ===
Eadric was appointed the Ealdorman of Mercia in 1007. The position had been vacant since 985, when his predecessor Ælfric Cild was driven into exile after being accused of treachery. However, Eadric must have been on better terms with king Æthelred as he was soon married to his daughter Eadgyth.

At this time, Æthelred ordered a new fleet of warships to be built, on a national scale, but this was weakened when Wulfnoth, who was accused by Eadric's brother Brihtric of treason, deserted with twenty ships to ravage the south coast. Brihtric chased after him with eighty ships, but they were wrecked in a storm. With England now more vulnerable to seaborne invasion, an army led by Thorkell the Tall arrived in 1009 and ravaged the country for the next three years. According to the Anglo-Saxon Chronicle on the one occasion when Æthelred succeeded in intercepting Thorkell, Eadric dissuaded him from engaging in battle. In 1012 Eadric oversaw the payment of £48,000 to the Danes to leave England.

=== Invasion ===
In 1013, Sweyn Forkbeard arrived in England with the intention of crowning himself King of England. By the end of 1013, English resistance had collapsed and Sweyn had conquered the country. Eadric's position at this time is not clear, but according to Roger of Wendover, Eadric "crossed over" the channel to Normandy with Queen Emma "and a hundred and forty soldiers". Æthelred followed them in January 1014.

However, the situation suddenly changed when Sweyn died on 3 February 1014. The crews of the Danish ships in the Trent, who had previously supported Sweyn, immediately swore their allegiance to his son Cnut; but leading English noblemen sent a proposal to Æthelred to negotiate Æthelred's restoration to the throne. He was required to declare his loyalty to the noblemen, to bring in reforms regarding everything that they previously disliked, and to forgive all that had been said and done against him in his previous reign. Æthelred soon regained his throne with assistance from Olaf Haraldsson; Cnut went back to Denmark, while his allies were punished for their cooperation with him.

In 1015, there was a council held in Oxford, to which Eadric invited the brothers Sigeferth and Morcar, who were two thegns from the Seven Burhs in the East Midlands. Eadric had them killed, probably on Æthelred's orders, and he seized their lands. This infuriated their close ally, Æthelred's oldest surviving son, Edmund Ironside, who married Sigeferth's widow and rebelled against his father.

=== Return of the Danes ===
Cnut arrived from Denmark in August 1015 at Sandwich in Kent with an invasion force of about 200 ships, but immediately went off plundering in Dorset, Wiltshire and Somerset. Eadric collected an army at Cosham, where king Æthelred lay sick. Edmund came to join him from the North, where his new territories lay. It is believed that Eadric had the intention of betraying Edmund, but when their forces came together he could not. The armies separated without incident, and Eadric soon took forty ships from the royal fleet, fled to Cnut, and entered into his service.

Around the New Year, Eadric accompanied Cnut into Warwickshire, where they plundered, burned and slew all they met. Edmund assembled an army to face them, but his Mercian forces refused to fight the Danes and disbanded. Edmund went on to assemble another army and, with the assistance of Earl Uhtred of Northumbria, plundered Eadric's lands in Staffordshire, Shropshire, and Cheshire. Uhtred returned to his occupied Northumbria to submit to Cnut, but he was killed and replaced with Eric Haakonsson. (Note: Manuscript C of the Anglo-Saxon Chronicle asserts that Uhtred was killed "by the advice of Ealdorman Eadric". This claim is, however, unlikely as John of Worcester and Symeon of Durham, both name the agent of Uhtred's death as one Thurbrand the Hold.)

Æthelred died on 23 April in London; his son Edmund was elected king of what was left of his father's kingdom. He fought two inconclusive battles against Cnut and Eadrict at Penselwood in Somerset and Sherston in Wiltshire, and then went on to rescue London, driving Eadric and Cnut away and defeating them after crossing the Thames at Brentford. He then withdrew to Wessex to gather fresh troops, and the Danes again brought London under siege. But after another unsuccessful assault, the Danes withdrew into Kent, under attack by the loyalists. After a final defeat at Otford, Eadric met Edmund at Aylesford and was accepted back into Edmund's good graces. Cnut set sail northwards across the sea to Essex, and went up the River Orwell to ravage Mercia.

=== Battle of Assandun ===
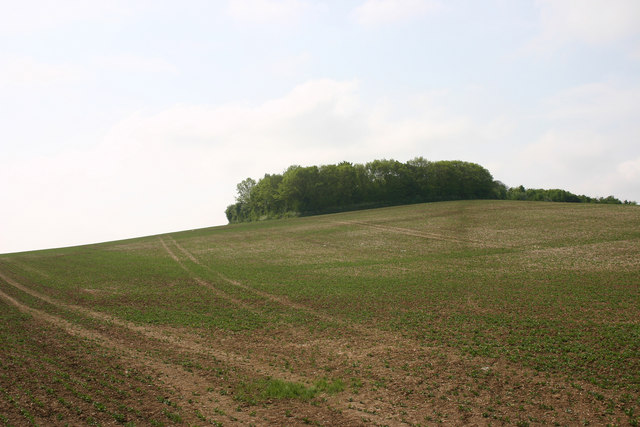
Ashingdon hill in Essex, the more likely location of the Battle of Assandun

On 18 October 1016, the Danes were engaged by Edmund's army as they retired towards their ships, leading to the Battle of Assandun – fought more probably at Ashingdon, in south-east, or Ashdon, in north-west Essex. In the ensuing struggle, Eadric, whose return to the English side was perhaps a ruse, withdrew his forces from the field of battle, and as the Anglo-Saxon Chronicle puts it, he "thus betrayed his liege lord and all the people of England", bringing about a decisive English defeat.

Edmund and Cnut made peace on the advice of Eadric on Ola's island near Deerhurst. It was decided that England would be split in half at the Thames, Cnut in the North and Edmund in the South; however, Edmund died in November 1016 and Cnut became sole ruler of England. In 1017 Cnut confirmed Eadric as Ealdorman of Mercia.

=== Death ===
Later in 1017, while at the royal palace in London, Eric Haakonsson killed Eadric by cutting off his head at the command of King Cnut. John of Worcester and the Encomium Emmae Reginae, commissioned by Cnut's widow Emma of Normandy in the early 1040s, both state that Cnut ordered Eadric's death because he feared that he would be as treacherous to Cnut as he had been Æthelred and Edmund. According to the Encomium, Cnut had Eadric killed "so that soldiers may learn from this example to be faithful, not faithless, to their kings".

The exact date of Eadric's death is not given by any source, but John of Worcester states that it was at Christmas, and Cnut ordered his body to be thrown over the city wall, and left unburied. Henry of Huntingdon says that Eadric's head was "placed upon a pole on the highest battlement of the tower of London". Eadric is not known to have had any children. His position was at some point filled by Leofric, the brother of Eadric's knight Northman, the family of whom held Mercia until after the Norman conquest.

== Character ==
According to John of Worcester, Eadric "was indeed a man of low birth but his tongue had won for him riches and rank; ready of wit, smooth of speech, he surpassed all men of that time, both in malice and treachery, and in arrogance and cruelty. William of Malmesbury was equally damning, describing him as "the dregs of mankind and a disgrace to his countrymen, a criminal debauchee and a cunning rascal, whose wealth owed its origin to his rank and had been increased by his skill in speech and his effrontery. A skilful deceiver with a ready invention, he sought out the king's intentions as his faithful servant, and spread them around as a common traitor. Often, when sent on a mission to the enemy to secure peace, he rekindled the war."

The historian Simon Keynes comments that Eadric acquired "a notoriety unmatched in Anglo-Saxon history for his complicity in an assortment of murders, base strategems and acts of treachery". In 2005, Eadric Streona was selected by historians for a poll conducted by the BBC History Magazine as the 11th century's worst Briton.

== Sources ==
- Campbell, Alistair, ed. (1949). Encomium Emmae Reginae. London, UK: Royal Historical Society. OCLC 1067634827.
- "Charter S 901". The Electronic Sawyer: Online Catalogue of Anglo-Saxon Charters. London, UK: King's College London.
- "Charter S 916". The Electronic Sawyer: Online Catalogue of Anglo-Saxon Charters. London, UK: King's College London.
- Darlington, Reginald; McGurk, Patrick, eds. (1995). The Chronicle of John of Worcester (in Latin and English). Vol. 2. Oxford, UK: Clarendon Press. ISBN 978-0-19-822261-3.
- Jones, Gwyn (1984). A History of the Vikings (2nd ed.). Oxford, UK: Oxford University Press. ISBN 978-0-19-280134-0.
- Keynes, Simon (1980). The Diplomas of King Æthelred the Unready 978-1016. Cambridge, UK: Cambridge University Press. ISBN 978-0-521-02308-5.
- Keynes, Simon (2007). "Eadric [Edric] Streona (d. 1017)". Oxford Dictionary of National Biography. Oxford University Press. doi:10.1093/ref:odnb/8511. (subscription, Wikipedia Library access or UK public library membership required)
- Lavelle, Ryan (2008). Aethelred II: King of the English (2nd ed.). Stroud, UK: The History Press. ISBN 978 0 7524 4678 3.
- Lawson, M. K. (2011). Cnut: England's Viking King 1016-35 (2nd ed.). Stroud, UK: The History Press. ISBN 978-0-7524-6069-7.
- Mynors, R. A. B.; Thomson, R. M.; Winterbottom, M., eds. (1998). William of Malmesbury: Gesta Regum Anglorum, The History of the English Kings (in Latin and English). Vol. I. Oxford, UK: Clarendon Press. ISBN 978-0-19-820678-1.
- Roach, Levi (2016). Æthelred the Unready. New Haven, Connecticut: Yale University Press. ISBN 978-0-300-22972-1.
- Trow, M. J. (2005). Cnut – Emperor of the North. Stroud: Sutton. ISBN 0-7509-3387-9.
- Whitelock, Dorothy; Douglas, David; Tucker, Susie, eds. (1961). The Anglo-Saxon Chronicle. London, UK: Eyre and Spottiswoode. OCLC 317315404.
- Williams, Ann (1995). The English and the Norman Conquest. Woodbridge, UK: The Boydell Press. ISBN 978-0-85115-708-5.
- Williams, Ann (2003). Æthelred the Unready: The Ill-Counselled King. London, UK: Hambledon and London. ISBN 978-1-85285-382-2.
- "'Worst' historical Britons list". BBC News. 27 December 2005.
