= Sigeferth (died 1015) =

Thegn of the Seven Burghs

Sigeferth (or Sigefrith) (died 1015) was, along with his brother Morcar, described by the Anglo-Saxon Chronicle as "chief thegn of the Seven Burghs".

According to the 12th century chronicle of John of Worcester, Sigeferth and Morcar were the sons of one Earngrim who is otherwise unrecorded. The Seven Burghs of which they were said to be the chief men are believed to have been the Five Burghs—Derby, Leicester, Lincoln, Nottingham and Stamford—together with Torksey and York. These were among the chief towns of the northern part of the Danelaw.

Sigeferth was murdered alongside his brother Morcar by Eadric Streona at Oxford in 1015.

King Æthelred seized both Morcar's and Sigeferth's lands, and imprisoned Sigeferth's widow who was called Ealdgyth. King Edmund Ironside seized the widow and married her. Edmund redistributed some of the lands that had previously belonged to Sigeferth.

== Sources ==
- Insley, Charles (2000), "Politics, Conflict and Kinship in Early Eleventh-Century Mercia" (PDF), Midland History, XXV
- Higham, Nick (1997), The Death of Anglo-Saxon England, Stroud: Sutton, ISBN 0-7509-2469-1
- Stafford, Pauline (1989), Unification and Conquest: a Political and Social History of England in the Tenth and Eleventh Centuries, London: Edward Arnold, ISBN 0-7131-6532-4
- Stenton, Frank (1971), Anglo-Saxon England (3rd ed.), Oxford: Oxford University Press, ISBN 0-19-280139-2
- Swanton, Michael (1996), The Anglo-Saxon Chronicle, New York: Routledge, ISBN 0-415-92129-5
- Williams, Ann (2003), Æthelred the Unready: the Ill-Counselled King, London: Hambledon & London, ISBN 1-85285-382-4
