= North Sea Empire =

1013–1042 empire in Northwest Europe

North Sea Empire Nordsøimperiet (Danish) Nordsjøveldet (Norwegian)
- 1013–1042
- The dominions of Cnut
- Status: Personal union of Denmark, Norway and England
- Capital: Winchester, England
- Common languages: Old Norse, Old English
- Religion: Christianity, Norse paganism
- Government: Monarchy
- King
  - 1013–1014: Sweyn Forkbeard
  - 1016–1035: Cnut the Great
  - 1040–1042: Harthacnut
- Historical era: Viking Age
  - Sweyn Forkbeard conquers England: 1013
  - Battle of Assandun and Cnut the Great became King of England: 1016
  - Cnut the Great became King of Denmark: 1018
  - Battle of Helgeå: 1026
  - Death of Harthacnut: 1042
Preceded by
| Kingdom of Denmark |
| Kingdom of Norway |
| Kingdom of England |
Succeeded by
| Kingdom of Denmark |
| Kingdom of Norway |
| Kingdom of England |

The North Sea Empire, also known as the Anglo-Scandinavian Empire, was the personal union of the kingdoms of England, Denmark (Note: Denmark at the time included parts of what is now Sweden.) and Norway for most of the period between 1013 and 1042 towards the end of the Viking Age. This ephemeral Norse-ruled empire was a thalassocracy, its components only connected by and dependent upon the sea.

The first king to unite all three kingdoms was Sweyn Forkbeard, king of Denmark since 986 and of Norway since 1000, when he conquered England in 1013. He died in the following year, and his realm was divided. His son Cnut the Great acquired England in 1016, Denmark in 1018 and Norway in 1028. He died in 1035 and his realm was again divided, but his successor in Denmark, Harthacnut, inherited England in 1040 and ruled it until his death in 1042. At the height of his power, when Cnut ruled all three kingdoms (1028–1035), he was the most powerful ruler in western Europe after the Holy Roman Emperor. (Note: As one historian put it: "When the 11th century began its fourth decade, Canute was, with the single exception of the Emperor, the most imposing ruler in Latin Christendom. ... [H]e was lord of four important realms and the overlord of other kingdoms. Though technically Canute was counted among the kings, his position among his fellow monarchs was truly imperial. Apparently, he held in his hands the destinies of two great regions: the British Isles and the Scandinavian peninsulas. His fleet all but controlled two important seas, the North and the Baltic. He had built an Empire.")

== Etymology ==
The term "North Sea Empire" was coined by historians at the beginning of the 20th century, although the conception of Cnut's domains as having constituted an empire can be found as early as 1623, in John Speed's Histoire of Great Britaine. Historically, the union was referred to by its individual parts: the kingdoms of Denmark, Norway, and England. As a largely maritime empire, it is often considered a thalassocracy.

== Formation ==
=== England ===
Cnut was the younger son of the Danish king Sweyn Forkbeard.

In early 1014 Sweyn and the Danes were in the midst of invading England. Cnut joined the expedition, and was given command of the fleet in the River Trent during one of Sweyn's visit to the south.

Sweyn died on 3 February, and Cnut had the early support of his Danish troops. But the invasion fell apart as the men of the Kingdom of Lindsey failed to supply horses they had promised. English nobles then reinstalled King Æthelred—whom they had previously deposed and exiled—after he promised reforms, and Cnut returned to Denmark.

Cnut's brother Harald succeeded Sweyn as King of Denmark. With the Danish throne out of his grasp, Cnut decided to invade England in his own right. He raised a fleet by promising shares of spoils and embarked for England in the summer of 1015; Eric Haakonsson of Norway provided. The English were divided by intrigue among Æthelred the king, his sons, and other nobles, and the moment was opportune for Cnut to invade.

Æthelred died on 23 April 1016—before Cnut could begin his attack in earnest—and a succession crisis ensued. Londoners chose Æthelred's son Edmund as his replacement, but the nobility swore fealty to Cnut at Southampton. Cnut began his campaign with a blockade of London, but was beaten by Edmund at the Battle of Otford. The Danes then moved into Essex where they defeated Edmund's forces at the Battle of Assandun. Edmund and Cnut struck an agreement under which Edmund would retain Wessex and Cnut would rule all of England north of the River Thames. Edmund's rule was to be short; he died on 30 November 1016, which left Cnut as the sole King of England.

Cnut cemented his power by marrying Æthelred's widow Emma in the summer of 1017. (He was already married to another English noblewoman, Ælfgifu of Northampton, at this time). In 1018, he paid off his invasion fleet—with money contributed largely from the citizens of London—and was fully recognised as King of England.

=== Denmark ===
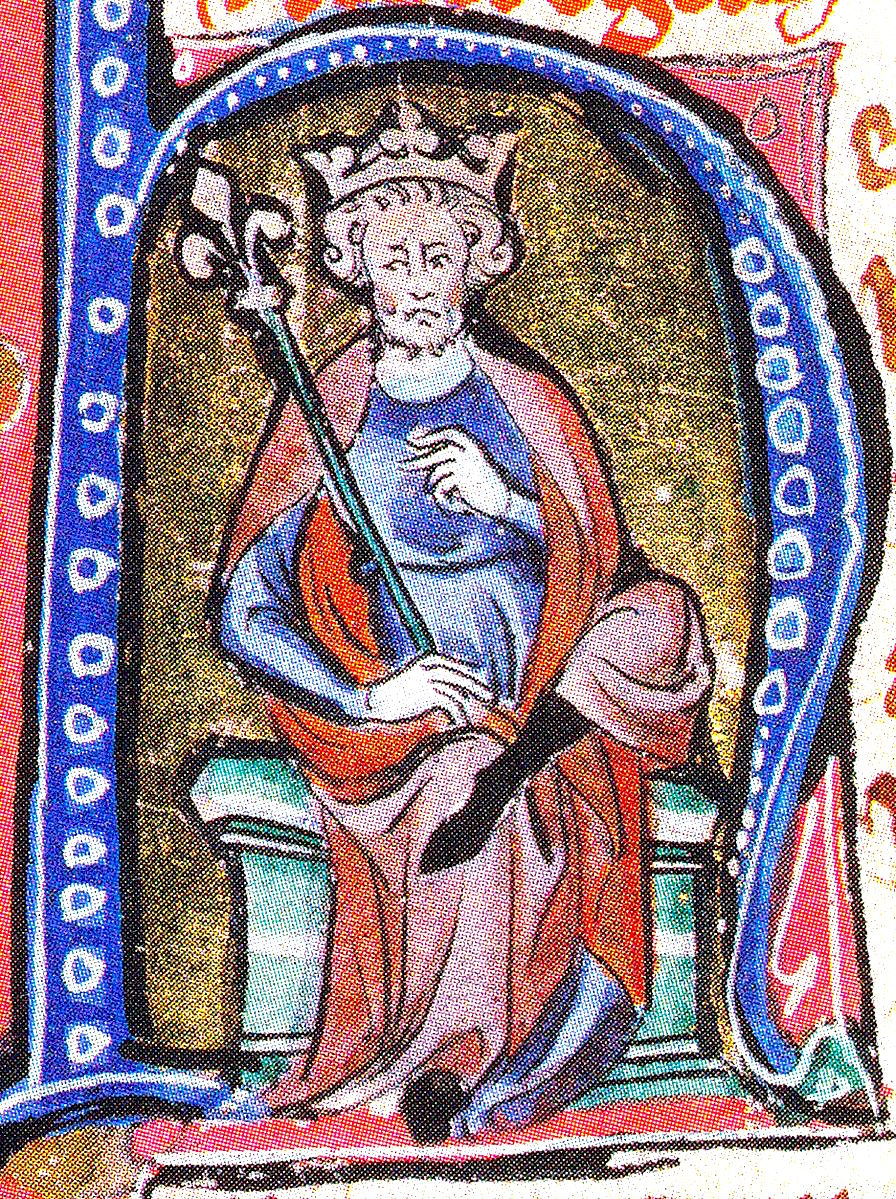
Cnut the Great

King Harald died childless in 1018 or 1019, leaving the country without a king. Cnut was his brother's heir and went to Denmark in 1019 to claim the throne. While in Denmark he sent his subjects in England a letter saying he was abroad to avert an unspecified "danger", and he only returned to quell incipient rebellions. One Danish chronicle states that the Danes had previously deposed Harald in favour of Cnut, then brought back Harald because of Cnut's frequent absences.

King Olaf II of Norway and King Anund Jacob of Sweden viewed the combined Anglo-Danish kingdom as a threat—Cnut's father Sweyn had asserted power over both their countries. Olaf attacked Denmark in 1025 or 1026 during one of Cnut's frequent absences. Ulf Jarl, Cnut's brother-in-law and former Danish regent, and Ulf's brother, joined the battle. Cnut surprised Olaf and defeated the Swedish fleet at the Battle of the Helgeå. Olaf fled, thus abandoning his designs on Cnut's rule in Denmark. Ulf's assistance at Helgeå did not allay Cnut's suspicions of Ulf's treachery. Chronicles say that on Christmas of 1026, Cnut ordered a housecarl to murder Ulf in Trinity Church, later Roskilde Cathedral, on the Danish island of Zealand.

Cnut went to Rome in 1027; the visit would have been both personal—penance for his sin of ordering Ulf's murder—and political—to assert himself as an equal to any other European monarch at the coronation of Conrad II as Holy Roman Emperor. The visit was fruitful. Cnut negotiated a reduction on tolls levied on Northern European pilgrims to Rome, and on the Papal tax on the pallium granted to English archbishops. He persuaded the Emperor to cede back to Denmark Schleswig and a strip of ancient Danish territory between Hedeby and the Eider that the Germans had been occupying. And the Emperor agreed to have his son Henry marry Cnut's daughter Gunnhild, further strengthening ties.

=== Norway ===
Olaf II had extended his power throughout Norway while Jarl Erik was with Cnut in England. Cnut's enmity with him extended further back: Æthelred had returned to England in a fleet provided by Olaf. In 1024, Cnut had offered to let Olaf govern Norway as his vassal; but after Helgeå, he set about undermining his unpopular rule with bribes, and in 1028 set out with 50 ships to subjugate Norway. A large contingent of Danish ships joined him, and Olaf withdrew into the Oslo Fjord while Cnut sailed along the coast, landing at various points and receiving oaths of allegiance from the local chieftains. Finally at Nidaros, now Trondheim, he was acclaimed king at the Eyrathing, and in a few months Olaf fled to Sweden.

In 1030, Olaf attempted to return, but the people of the Trondheim area did not want him back and he was defeated and killed at the Battle of Stiklestad.

=== Sweden ===
After Helgeå, Cnut also claimed to rule "part of Sweden" together with England, Denmark, and Norway. There is evidence for his having had coins minted either in the capital Sigtuna or in Lund—then part of Denmark—with the inscription CNVT REX SW ("Cnut King of the Swedes"). (Western Geatland or Blekinge have also been suggested as production locales). The inscription may have been propaganda or boasting, as Cnut did not actually have to be present in Sweden for these coins to be produced—he also had coins minted which proclaimed him ruler of Ireland. These coins are however usually regarded as copies of coins minted in Denmark (curiously, coins stating that the Swedish king Olof Skötkonung was King of England have also been found in Sigtuna). Irish coinage and Swedish history at this early date is very uncertain.

==== Ouster ====
Anglo-Saxon sources state Anund Jakob won the Battle of Helgeå. The Danes controlled Svealand for at most three years. Anund ousted Cnut; Swedish sources assert that Anund controlled the country by 1030, and the 11th-century chronicler Adam of Bremen described Anund choosing the bishops for all of Sweden. In that same year, Olaf attempted to retake the Norwegian throne from Cnut, his second such attempt; Anund supported Olaf and sent Swedish troops to aid his campaign.

=== Tributary areas ===
Cnut allied with the Poles and received tribute from the Wends. In 1022, together with Godwin and Ulf Jarl, he took a fleet east into the Baltic to consolidate his rule over the coastal areas which the Danish kings had dominated from Jomsborg.

Upon returning to Britain from his 1027 visit to Rome, Cnut led an army into Scotland and made vassals of three of its kings; one of these was High King Malcolm. Another was Echmarcach mac Ragnaill, a sea-king whose lands included Galloway and the Isle of Man and who would become king of Dublin in 1036. It is likely that the Welsh paid Cnut tribute on the model of the Danegeld that Æthelred had instituted to pay off the Danes. Cnut's rule re-inaugurated Anglo-Danish dominion over the Celtic kingdoms that had weakened under English kings; he punished those who had supported Olaf against him. A verse by the Icelandic skald Óttarr svarti calls Cnut "king of the Danes, the Irish, the English and the Islanders"; Norway is not named as Cnut had not yet come to power there.

== Religion ==
By the early 11th century, England had been Christian for centuries; the Danelaw was in transition from paganism to Christianity, but the Scandinavian countries were still predominantly pagan. Cnut's father, Sweyn, had initially been pagan but in later life had been basically Christian. In England, Cnut assiduously promoted the interests of the Church, and this brought him acceptance from the Christian rulers of Europe that no other Scandinavian king had previously been accorded. In Norway, in contrast, he built churches and was both respectful and generous to the clergy, but also made allies of the heathen chieftains, and unlike Olaf, did not make laws benefitting the Church until his power was on a solid footing.

== Governance ==
Earldoms of England c. 1025

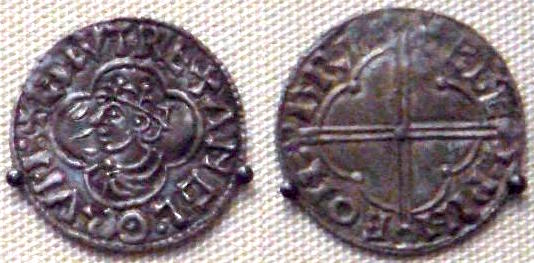
Penny of Cnut the Great

Early in 1017, probably because he was king by right of conquest not more normal means, Cnut divided England into four earldoms on the Scandinavian model: Wessex he governed directly, and of his allies Thorkell the Tall became Earl of East Anglia, Eric Haakonsson retained Northumbria, which Cnut had already given him, and Eadric Streona became Earl of Mercia. But the last was disgraced and executed within a year. In 1018, Cnut revived at least two earldoms in Wessex and at a meeting at Oxford, his followers and representatives of the English agreed that he would govern under the laws of King Edgar.

Anglo-Saxon historian Frank Stenton points out that the Anglo-Saxon Chronicle has relatively little to say about Cnut's reign except to note his frequent travels abroad, indicating that he was in strong control of England. Thorkell likely acted as his regent during his absences, until they had a falling out and he was outlawed in 1021. The terms of their reconciliation in Denmark in 1023, with an exchange of sons for fosterage and Thorkell becoming Cnut's regent in Denmark, suggests that Thorkell had won them with an armed force.

However, it was left to another of Cnut's earls, Siward, to protect his earldom of Northumbria by consolidating English power in Scotland; at his death in 1055 he, not the king, was overlord of all the territory that the Kingdom of Strathclyde had annexed early the previous century.

The Danes had more reason to grumble about Cnut's absences than the English; he reigned primarily from England, leaving regents in charge in Denmark. He replaced Thorkell as his primary advisor in England with Godwin, an Englishman whom he made Earl of Wessex, while within three years of their reconciliation, he had also been replaced as regent of Denmark, by Ulf Jarl, Cnut's sister's husband, whom Cnut also made guardian of his son by Emma, Harthacnut. Ulf in turn proved less than loyal, first conspiring against him with the kings of Sweden and Norway, then making a power play by having the nobles swear fealty to Harthacnut (thus effectively to him); Cnut returned to Denmark at Christmas 1026, ordered his housecarls to kill Ulf, and it was done in Trinity church at Roskilde. By the end of his life, he had entirely replaced the Scandinavian inner circle who advised him with Englishmen.

In Norway, Cnut stayed into the new year and then left Jarl Erik's son Hakon in charge as his regent (he had served Sweyn Forkbeard in the same capacity), but he drowned the following winter. As his replacement Cnut sent Swein, the younger of his two sons by Ælfgifu and thus known as Sveinn Alfífuson in Norway – along with his mother as guardian. They were delayed in southern Norway while Olaf's return was rebuffed but became even more unpopular than he had been. Ælfgifu tried to impose new taxation and stricter controls on a people who valued their independence and especially resented that the new customs were Danish.

Cnut also prepared to hand over Denmark to one of his sons: upon taking power in Norway, he held a great court in Nidaros and proclaimed Harthacnut, his son by Emma, king of Denmark. As Stenton points out, by appointing different sons his heirs in different countries, he demonstrated that he did not have "the deliberate intention of founding a northern empire ... [which] would remain united after his death." It may have been simply the custom of his people. In any event, it was clear throughout Cnut's reign that the weakness of his empire lay in the impossibility of finding loyal and competent regents to govern when he could not be present. And his sons could not hold it together.

== After Cnut's death ==
The North Sea Empire collapsed immediately once Cnut died in 1035. In Norway, it was already collapsing: by the winter of 1033, Swein and Ælfgifu were so unpopular that they were forced to leave Trondheim. In 1034, the leader of the army that had rebuffed and killed King Olaf at Stiklestad went together with one of the king's loyal followers to bring his young son Magnus back from Gardariki to rule, and in autumn 1035, a few weeks before Cnut's death, Swein and his mother had to flee the country altogether and go to Denmark. Swein died shortly afterwards.

In Denmark, Harthacnut was already ruling as king, but he was unable to leave for three years because of the threat that Magnus of Norway would invade to exact revenge. In the meantime the English nobles, divided between him and Cnut's younger son by Ælfgifu, Harold Harefoot, decided to compromise by having Harold rule as regent; by the end of 1037, Ælfgifu had persuaded the most important nobles to swear allegiance to Harold, who was firmly ensconced as Harold I – and Harthacnut's own mother, Queen Emma, had been forced to take refuge in Flanders.

Harthacnut prepared an invasion fleet to wrest England from his half-brother, but the latter died in 1040 before it could be used. Harthacnut then became king of England, reuniting it with Denmark, but made a generally bad impression as king. The Anglo-Saxon Chronicle said of him that he never did anything royal during his entire reign. He died suddenly in June 1042 "as he stood at his drink" at the wedding feast of Tovi the Proud, one of the Danish thegns of his father's court. At first glance Harthacnut's death seems to have brought about the end of the North Sea Empire. However, Magnus of Norway, utilising the agreement he had made with Harthacnut in 1040, took control of Denmark and had plans to invade England and reunite the kingdoms and Empire. In consolidating his power in Denmark he crushed a Wendish invasion at the battle of Lyrskov Hede initiated shortly after he had destroyed the Jomsviking heartlands. This may have been an effective own goal, as it destroyed one of the key political and military components of Sveyn Forkbeard and Cnut the Great's rise to dominance. While Magnus had ejected Sveyn Estridsson from Denmark in 1046, Adam of Bremen briefly notes that Sveyn and an Earl Tovi removed Magnus from Denmark in 1047. This is confirmed by the contemporary Anglo-Saxon Chronicle, which reports that in 1047 Sveyn asked England for 50 ships to help in the battle against Magnus. "And then Sveyn expelled Magnus from Denmark and entered the country by a huge carnage, and the Danes paid him a large sum of money and recognized him as king. And the same year Magnus died.'

== See also ==
- Kalmar Union
- List of English monarchs
- List of Danish monarchs
- List of Norwegian monarchs
- List of possessions of Norway
- Norse activity in the British Isles
- Viking expansion
