= Encomium Emmae Reginae =

Medieval Latin work from England

- Gesta Cnutonis Regis
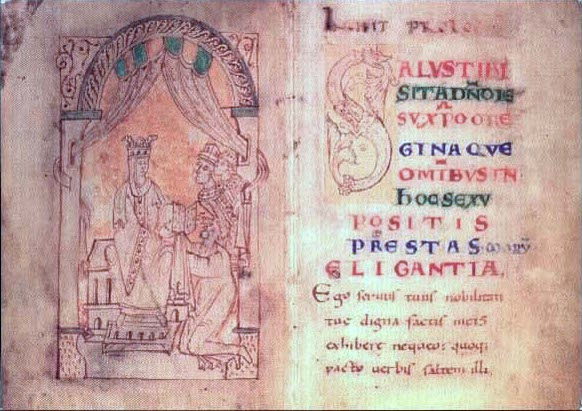
- Queen Emma receiving the Encomium Emmae Reginae from the author (kneeling), with her sons Harthacnut and Edward the Confessor in the background. This illustration is found in the extant 11th-century copy of the Encomium in the British Library.
- Author(s): "The Encomiast", an anonymous monk of St Bertin's Abbey
- Patron: Emma of Normandy
- Audience: Harthacnut's court
- Language: Latin
- Date: 1041 / 1042
- Manuscript(s): (1) BL, Add. 33241; (2) NLW, Hengwrt 158 (=Peniarth 281); (3) BL, Add. 6920; (4) Bibliothèque Nationale, Fonds Lat. 6235; (5) Courtenay Compendium (olim Exeter, Devon Record Office)
- Personages: Emma, Harthacnut, Thorkill, etc.

Encomium Emmae Reginae or Gesta Cnutonis Regis is an 11th-century Latin encomium in honour of the English queen Emma of Normandy. It was written in 1041 or 1042, probably by a monk of Saint Bertin, which was then in the County of Flanders.

== Manuscripts ==
Until 2008, it was believed that there was just a single medieval manuscript surviving (although there are other later, fragmentary copies). Kept in the British Library, it is lavishly illustrated, and believed to be the copy sent to Queen Emma or a close reproduction of that copy. One leaf has been lost from the manuscript in modern times, but its text survives in late paper copies.

Then another medieval manuscript, the Courtenay Compendium, was found in the papers of the 18th Earl of Devon at the Devon Record Office. This version, however, is believed to have been compiled in 1043, around two years after the other surviving text. It adds detail to the content, showing the rise and succession of Edward the Confessor in a very positive light. The first manuscript offers him just a fleeting mention.

The new manuscript was acquired by the Royal Library of Denmark in 2010.

== Date and provenance ==
It is usually thought that the text was written in 1041 or 1042, in response to a politically delicate situation, which had arisen recently at the English court. Harthacnut (reigned 1040–42), Emma's son by Cnut the Great, was king of England, and Edward the Confessor, her son by Æthelred, had been invited back from exile in Normandy and sworn in as Harthacnut's successor. The concurrent presence of a king and another claimant to the throne was a recipe for unrest, especially considering that Edward's brother, Ælfred (died 1036), had earlier been betrayed (as rumour had it, at the instigation of Earl Godwin).

As the portrait above emphasises, the work appears to have been directed specifically at Harthacnut and Edward, instilling a message about their past and future. As such, the Encomium is a heavily biased and selective work. Commissioned by Queen Emma herself, it strives to show her and Cnut in as favourable a light as possible. Thus, it silently glosses over Emma's first marriage to Æthelred, contests whether Harold Harefoot, Cnut's son by his first wife Ælfgifu, was indeed a son of Cnut, and places the blame for Ælfred's murder squarely on Harold.

Despite its shortcomings, the Encomium is an important primary source for early 11th-century English and Scandinavian history.

== Authorship ==
The anonymous author, often simply referred to as "The Encomiast", was probably a Flemish monk, as he identifies himself in the text as a monk of the Abbey of Saint Bertin. He mentions that he wrote the work at the specific request of his patroness Emma, to whom he shows some gratitude, and that he had witnessed Cnut when the king visited the abbey on his journey homeward.

== Form and content ==
The form and style of the text show much indebtedness to classical authors. Virgil and his Aeneid are explicitly cited in the prefatory letter and in Book I, Chapter 4, while influences from Sallust, Lucan, Ovid, Horace, Juvenal and Lucretius have also been detected.

The Encomium divides into three books. The first deals with Sweyn Forkbeard, King of Denmark, and his conquest of England. The second deals with his son, Cnut the Great, his reconquest of England, his marriage to Emma and his period of rule. The third book deals with events after Cnut's death: Emma's troubles during the reign of Harold Harefoot, and the accession of her sons, Harthacnut and Edward the Confessor, to the throne.

According to the medievalist Eleanor Parker, "The Encomium reveals an active and forceful woman participating in the writing of history, reshaping the story of her own life in a way that suited her interests."
