= Danish Empire =

The term Danish Empire may refer to:

- The North Sea Empire of Cnut the Great (1016–1035)
- The Danish overseas colonies in North America, the West Indies, the Gold Coast and India
- Danish Realm, sovereign state which consists of Denmark, the Faroe Islands and Greenland
