= Harold Harefoot =

King of England from 1037 to 1040

Harold I
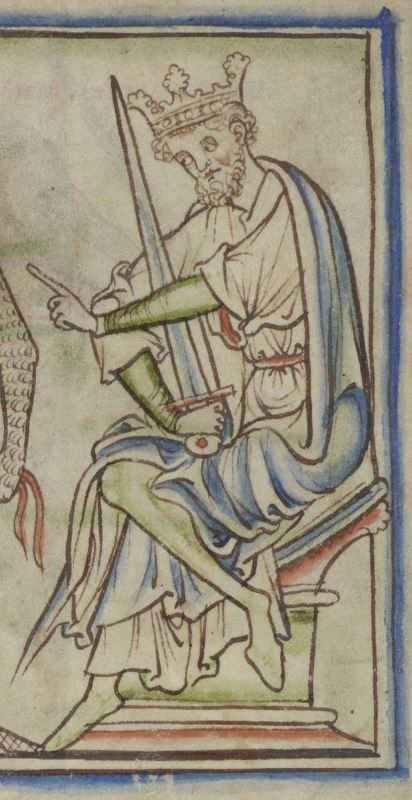
- Harold Harefoot drawn in the 13th century, from The Life of King Edward the Confessor by Matthew Paris

King of England
- Reign: after 12 November 1035 – 17 March 1040
- Predecessor: Cnut
- Successor: Harthacnut
- Died: 17 March 1040; Oxford, England
- Burial: Westminster Abbey, then moved to St. Clement Danes, Westminster, England
- Spouse: Ælfgifu?
- Issue: Ælfwine?
- House: Knýtlinga
- Father: Cnut, King of England
- Mother: Ælfgifu of Northampton

Harold I (died 17 March 1040), commonly known as Harold Harefoot, was King of England from 1037 to 1040. His nickname is first recorded in the twelfth century in the history of Ely Abbey as "Harefoh" or "Harefah". Some late medieval chroniclers interpreted it as meaning that he was "fleet of foot".

The son of Cnut the Great and Ælfgifu of Northampton, Harold was chosen as regent of England after his father's death in 1035, ruling in place of his half-brother Harthacnut, who remained in Denmark. Æthelnoth, Archbishop of Canterbury, reportedly refused to crown him, but in 1037 Harold was proclaimed king with the support of Leofric, Earl of Mercia, and other leading nobles. That same year, Harold's two stepbrothers Edward and Ælfred returned to England. Ælfred was captured by Earl Godwin and handed over to men loyal to Harold. He was blinded while being taken to Ely and died soon afterwards.

Harold died in 1040, after ruling as regent or king for nearly five years. His half-brother Harthacnut returned soon afterwards and assumed power peacefully. Harold was originally buried in Westminster, but Harthacnut had his body exhumed and thrown into a fen beside the River Thames. It was reportedly recovered by a fisherman and reburied in a Danish cemetery in London.

== Disputed paternity ==
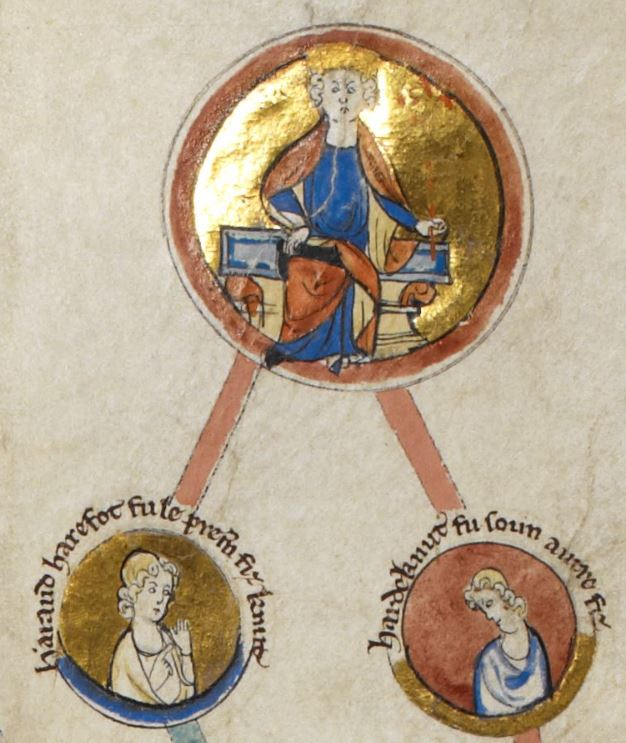
Cnut, king of England, Denmark, and Norway, and his sons Harald Harefoot and Harthacnut

The Anglo-Saxon Chronicle reports that Harold claimed to be the son of Cnut the Great and Ælfgifu of Northampton, "although it was not true". Florence of Worcester, writing in the twelfth century, gives a more elaborate version of this story. According to Florence, Ælfgifu, unable to have a son by Cnut, secretly adopted newborn children and presented them as her own. Harold was said to be the son of a cobbler, while his brother Svein Knutsson was described as the illegitimate son of a priest. Ælfgifu then allegedly deceived Cnut into recognising both children as his sons.

The historian Harriet O'Brien doubts that Cnut could have been deceived in this way. She suggests that the story may have originated as a popular myth or as hostile propaganda connected with Emma of Normandy, Cnut's other wife and Ælfgifu's rival.

== Succession crisis ==
Upon Cnut's death on 12 November 1035, Harold's younger half-brother Harthacnut, the son of Cnut and his queen Emma of Normandy, had a strong claim to the thrones of both Denmark and England. Harthacnut, however, was unable to travel to England because Denmark was threatened by Magnus I of Norway and Anund Jacob of Sweden. England's magnates (Note: Earl Leofric, almost all the thegns north of the Thames, and the men of the fleet in London.) therefore favoured the idea of installing Harold temporarily as regent or joint ruler. This was opposed by Godwin, Earl of Wessex and Queen Emma, but Harold eventually secured power. The Anglo-Saxon Chronicle gives differing accounts of his initial role. Versions E and F describe him as regent, while other versions present him as co-ruler.

Ian Howard points out that Cnut had been survived by three sons: Svein, Harold, and Harthacnut. The Encomium Emmae Reginae also describes Edward the Confessor and Alfred Aetheling as the sons of Canute, though the modern term would be step-sons. Harold could claim the regency or kingship because he was the only one of the five present in England in 1035. Harthacnut was reigning in Denmark, and Svein had joined him there following his deposition from the Norwegian throne, while Edward and Alfred were in Normandy. Harold could reign in the name of his absent brothers, with Emma rivalling him as a candidate for the regency.

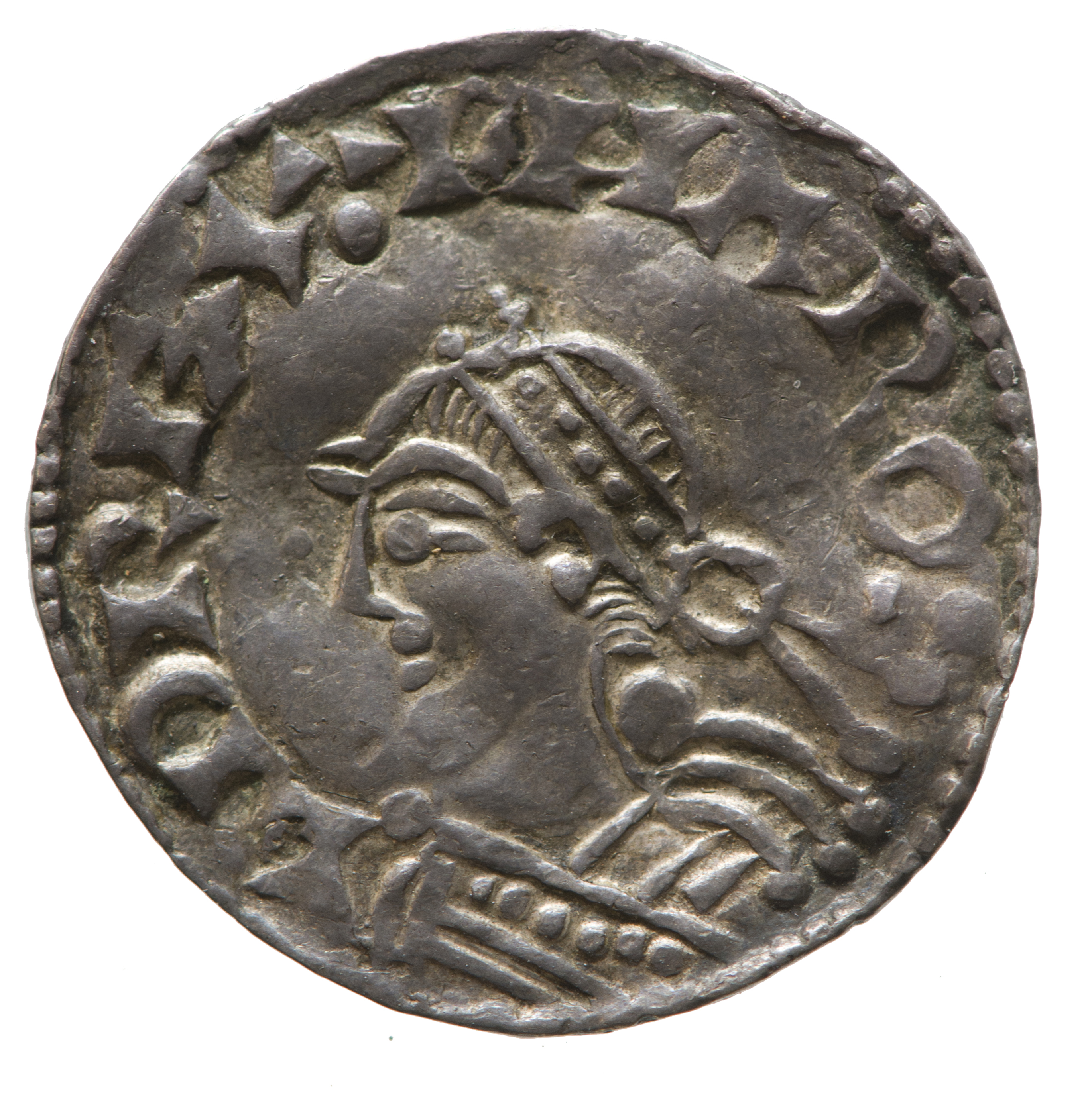
Silver penny of Harold I

The Anglo-Saxon Chronicle ignores the existence of Svein, or his claim to the throne, which Howard considers as evidence of the relative entries being unreliable, of failing to give a complete picture. The Heimskringla of Snorri Sturluson claims that Svein and Harthacnut had agreed to share the kingdom between them. This agreement would include Denmark and (probably) England. Snorri quotes older sources on the subject and could be preserving valuable details.

== Reign ==
=== Assumption of the throne ===
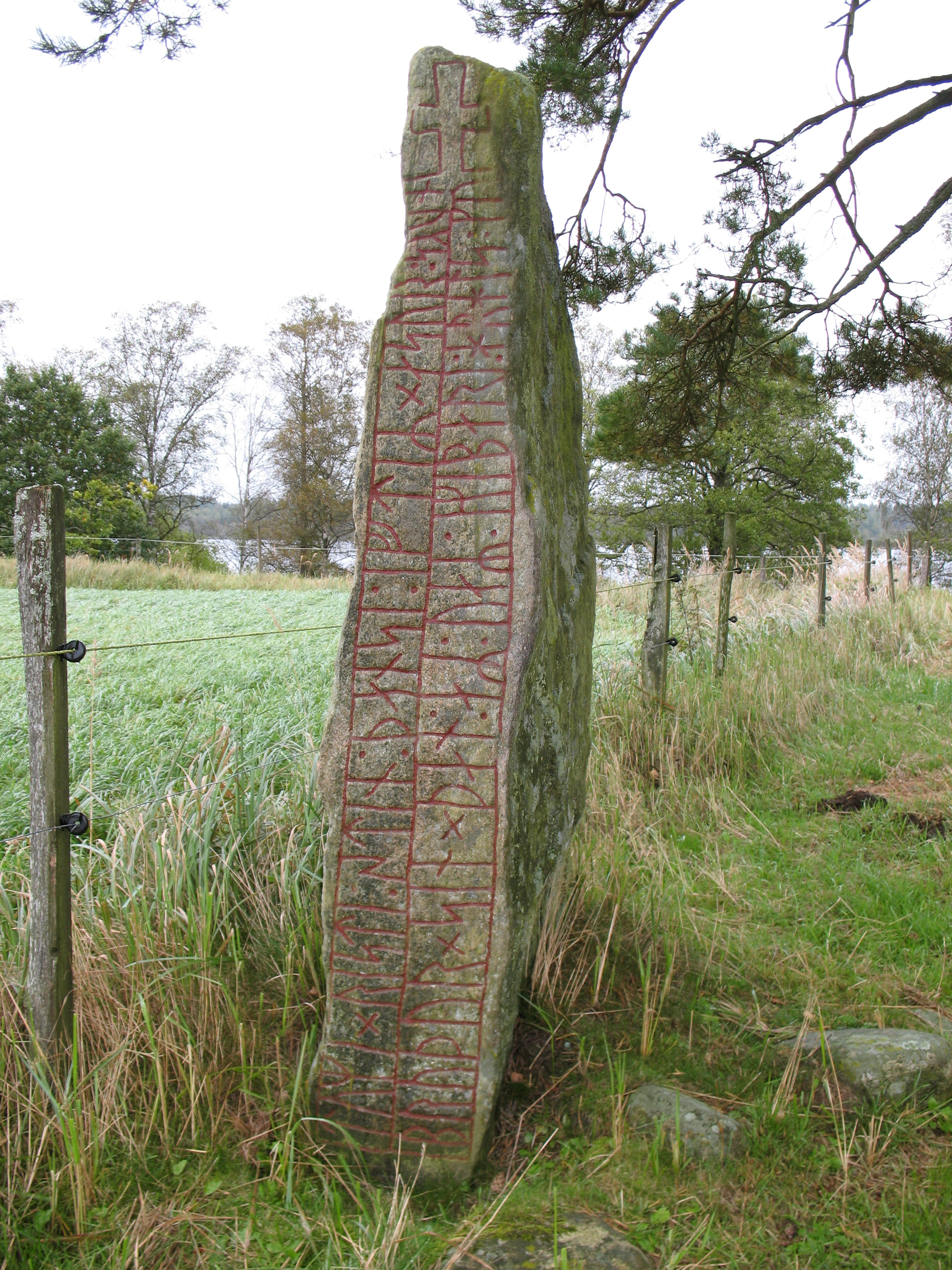
The runestone Sm 42, in Småland, Sweden, mentions "Haralds kunungs", probably meaning King Harold Harefoot.

Harold reportedly sought coronation as early as 1035. According to the Encomium Emmae Reginae, however, Æthelnoth, Archbishop of Canterbury, refused to crown Harold Harefoot. Coronation by the Archbishop would be a legal requirement to become a king. Æthelnoth reportedly placed the sceptre and crown on the altar of a temple, possibly that of the Canterbury Cathedral. Offering to consecrate Harold without using any of the royal regalia would have been an empty honour. He refused to remove the items from the altar and forbade any other bishop from doing so. The tale goes on that Harold failed to sway Æthelnoth, as both bribes and threats proved ineffectual. The despairing Harold reportedly rejected Christianity in protest. He refused to attend church services while uncrowned, preoccupying himself with hunting and trivial matters.

The Encomium stays silent on an event reported by the Anglo-Saxon Chronicle and other sources. Harold was accepted as monarch in a Witenagemot held at Oxford. His chief supporter in the council was Leofric, Earl of Mercia, while the opposition was led by Godwin, Earl of Wessex. There is evidence that Ælfgifu of Northampton was attempting to secure her son's position through bribes to the nobles. In 1036, Gunhilda of Denmark, sister to Harthacnut and half-sister to Harold, married Henry III, King of Germany. On this occasion Immo, a priest serving at the court of the Holy Roman Empire, wrote a letter to Azecho, Bishop of Worms. It included information on the situation in England, with messengers from there reporting that Ælfgifu was gaining the support of the leading aristocrats through pleas and bribery, binding them to herself and Harold by oaths of loyalty.

Initially, the Kingdom of England was divided between the two half-brothers. Harold ruled the areas north of the River Thames, supported by the local nobility. The southern nobility under Godwin and Emma continued to be ruled in the name of the absent Harthacnut. The Anglo-Saxon Chronicle reports that Godwin and the leading men of Wessex opposed the rule of Harold for "...as long as they could, but they could not do anything against it." With the north at least on Harold's side, in adherence to the terms of a deal, which Godwin was part of, Emma was settled in Winchester, with Harthacnut's huscarls. Harold soon "sent and had taken from her all the best treasures" of Cnut the Great.

The situation could not last for long, and Godwin eventually switched sides. William of Malmesbury asserts that Godwin had been overwhelmed "in power and in numbers" by Harold. In late 1037 Harold was formally accepted as king and Emma was driven into exile in Flanders. The details behind the event are obscure. The account of the Anglo-Saxon Chronicle, version E, jumps from Harold being a mere regent to Harold being the sole king. Versions C and D do not even make a distinction between the two phases. Ian Howard theorises that the death of Svein Knutsson could have strengthened Harold's position. He went from being the second surviving son of Cnut to being the eldest living, with Harthacnut still absent and unable to press his claim to the throne.

Harold himself is somewhat obscure; the historian Frank Stenton considered it probable that his mother Ælfgifu was "the real ruler of England" for part or all of his reign. Kelly DeVries points out that during the High Middle Ages, royal succession in Northern Europe was determined by military power. The eldest son of a king could have a superior right of inheritance but still lose the throne to a younger brother, or other junior claimant, possessing greater military support. Harold managed to win the throne against the superior claim of Harthacnut in this way. The 11th century provides other similar examples. Magnus I of Norway (reigned 1035–1047), who wasn't a warlord, had reigned for more than a decade when his uncle Harald Hardrada (reigned 1047–1066) challenged his rule. With Harald being a famous military leader, his claim would end Magnus' reign early. Baldwin VI, Count of Flanders (reigned 1067–1070) was effectively succeeded by his brother Robert I (reigned 1071–1093), rather than his own sons. Robert Curthose, Duke of Normandy (reigned 1087–1106) lost the throne of England to his younger brothers William II (reigned 1087–1100) and Henry I (reigned 1100–1135).

With the Kingdom of England practically owned by Harold, Harthacnut could not even approach without securing sufficient military strength. His decision to remain in Denmark probably points to him lacking sufficient support, though he would certainly wait for an opportunity to forcefully assert his claim and depose his half-brother. Harold reigned as sole king from 1037 to 1040. There are few surviving documents about events of his reign. The Anglo-Saxon Chronicle mostly covers church matters, such as the deaths and appointments of bishops and archbishops. There is, however, a record of a skirmish between the Anglo-Saxons and the Welsh in 1039. The named casualties were Eadwine (Edwin), brother to Leofric, Earl of Mercia, Thurkil, and Ælfgeat, but there are no other details concerning this event. Also in 1039, there is mention of a great gale, again with no details.

=== Return of Ælfred and Edward ===
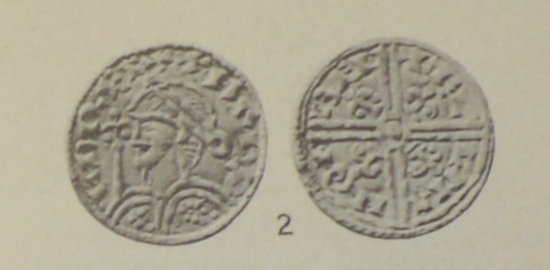
Coin of Harold Harefoot

In 1036, Ælfred Ætheling, son of Emma by the long-dead Æthelred, returned to the kingdom from exile in the Duchy of Normandy with his brother Edward the Confessor, with some show of arms. Their motivation is uncertain. William of Poitiers claimed that they had come to claim the English throne for themselves. Frank Barlow suspected that Emma had invited them, possibly to use them against Harold. If so, it could mean that Emma had abandoned the cause of Harthacnut, probably to strengthen her own position, but that could have inspired Godwin to also abandon the lost cause.

The Encomium Emmae Reginae claims that Harold himself had lured them to England, having sent them a forged letter, supposedly written by Emma. The letter reportedly both decried Harold's behaviour against her and urged her estranged sons to come and protect her. Barlow and other modern historians suspect that this letter was genuine. Ian Howard argued that Emma not being involved in a major political manoeuvre would be "out of character for her", and the Encomium was probably trying to mask her responsibility for a blunder. William of Jumièges reports that earlier in 1036, Edward had conducted a successful raid of Southampton, managing to win a victory against the troops defending the city and then sailing back to Normandy "richly laden with booty", but the swift retreat confirms William's assessment that Edward would need a larger army to seriously claim the throne.

With his bodyguard, according to the Anglo-Saxon Chronicle, Ælfred intended to visit his mother, Emma, in Winchester, but he may have made this journey for reasons other than a family reunion. As the "murmur was very much in favour of Harold", on the direction of Godwin (now apparently on the side of Harold Harefoot), Ælfred was captured. Godwin had him seized and delivered to an escort of men loyal to Harefoot. He was transported by ship to Ely, and blinded while on board. He died in Ely soon afterwards from his wounds, his bodyguard being similarly treated. The event would later affect the relationship between Edward and Godwin, the Confessor holding Godwin responsible for the death of his brother.

The failed invasion shows that Harold Harefoot, as a son and successor to Cnut, had gained the support of Anglo-Danish nobility, which violently rejected the claims of Ælfred, Edward, and (by extension) the Aethelings. The House of Wessex had lost support among the nobility of the Kingdom. It might also have served as a turning point in the struggle between Harold and Emma that resulted in Emma's exile.

=== Death ===
Harold died at Oxford on 17 March 1040, just as Harthacnut was preparing an invasion force of Danes, and was buried at Westminster Abbey. His body was subsequently exhumed, beheaded, and thrown into a fen bordering the Thames when Harthacnut assumed the throne in June 1040. The body was subsequently recovered by fishermen, and resident Danes reportedly had it reburied at their local cemetery in London. The body was eventually buried in a church in the City of Westminster, which was fittingly named St. Clement Danes. A contradictory account in the Knýtlinga saga (13th century) reports Harold buried in the city of Morstr, alongside his half-brother Harthacnut and their father Cnut. While mentioned as a great city in the text, nothing else is known of Morstr. The Heimskringla by Snorri Sturluson reports Harold Harefoot to have been buried at Winchester, again alongside Cnut and Harthacnut.

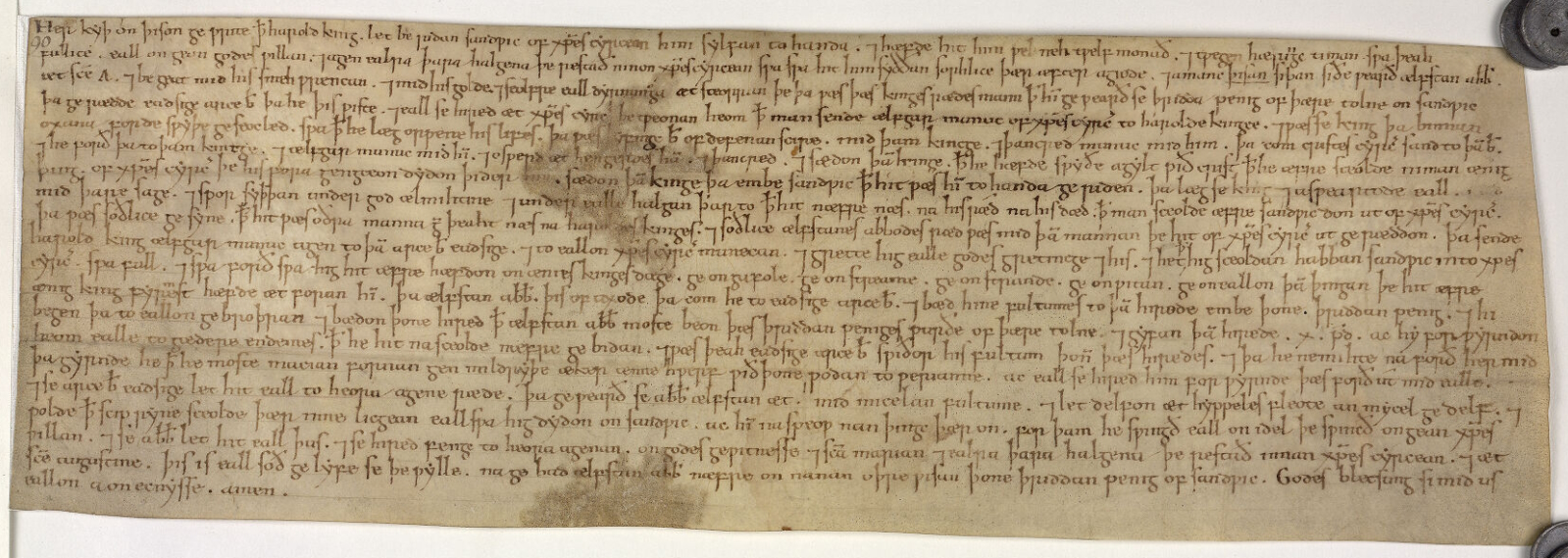
S 1467 dated 1038–1040 is a partisan account of Harold's restoration of Sandwich to Christ Church, which was disputed between Christ Church and St Augustine's.

The cause of Harold's death is uncertain. Katherine Holman attributes the death to "a mysterious illness". An Anglo-Saxon charter attributes the illness to divine judgement. Harold had reportedly claimed Sandwich for himself, thereby depriving the monks of Christchurch. Harold is described as lying ill and in despair at Oxford. When monks came to him to settle the dispute over Sandwich, he "lay and grew black as they spoke". The context of the event was a dispute between Christchurch and St Augustine's Abbey, which took over the local toll in the name of the king. There is little attention paid to the illness of the king. Harriet O'Brien feels this is enough to indicate that Harold died of natural causes, but not to determine the nature of the disease. The Anglo-Saxons themselves would consider him elf-shot (attacked by elves), their term for any number of deadly diseases. Michael Evans points out that Harold was only one of several youthful kings of pre-Conquest England to die following short reigns. Others included Edmund I (reigned 939–946, murdered at age 25), Eadred (reigned 946–955, died at age 32), Eadwig (reigned 955–959, died at age 19), Edmund Ironside (reigned 1016, died at age 26), and Harthacnut (reigned 1040–1042, who would die at age 24). Evans wonders whether the role of king was dangerous in this era, more so than in the period after the Conquest, or whether hereditary diseases were in effect since most of these kings were members of the same lineage, the House of Wessex.

It is unclear why a king would have been buried at Westminster Abbey. The only previous royals reportedly buried there were Sæberht of Essex and his wife Æthelgoda. Emma Mason speculates that Cnut had built a royal residence in the vicinity of the Abbey, or that Westminster held some significance to the Danish Kings of England, which would also explain why Harthacnut would not allow a usurper to be buried there. The lack of detail in the Anglo-Saxon Chronicle implies that, for its compilers, the main point of interest was not the burial site, but the exhumation of the body. Harriet O'Brien theorises that the choice of location might simply reflect the political affiliation of the area of Westminster and nearby London, being a power base for Harold.

A detailed account of the exhumation appears in the writings of John of Worcester (12th century). The group tasked with the mission was reportedly led by Ælfric Puttoc, Archbishop of York, and Godwin, Earl of Wessex. The involvement of such notable men would have had a significance of its own, giving the event an official nature and avoiding secrecy. Emma Mason suspects that this could also serve as a punishment for Godwin, who had served as a chief supporter of Harold, and was now charged with the gruesome task.

== Offspring ==
Harold may have had a wife, Ælfgifu, and a son, Ælfwine, who became a monk on the continent when he was older – his monastic name was Alboin. Ælfwine/Alboin is recorded in 1060 and 1062 in charters from the Abbey Church of Saint Foy in Conques, which mention him as son of "Heroldus rex fuit Anglorum" (Latin: Harold, who was king of the English People). Harold Harefoot is the most likely father as the only other king Harold was Harold Godwinson, who would not rise to the throne until 1066. Either way, an underage boy would be unable to claim the throne in 1040. His possible hereditary claims would not be enough to gain the support of the leading nobles against the adult Harthacnut.

Ælfgifu of Northampton disappears with no trace after 1040. According to the Anglo-Saxon Chronicle, Harold Harefoot ruled for four years and sixteen weeks, by which calculation he would have begun ruling two weeks after the death of Cnut.

== Reputation ==
The Prose Brut chronicle was an Anglo-Norman work, covering British and English monarchs from Brut (Brutus of Troy) to the death of Henry III in 1272. It was probably written during the reign of Edward I (reigned 1272–1307), though the oldest surviving manuscript dates to 1338. The text often includes notable errors. The original author remains unknown, but there were a number of continuations by different hands, extending the story to the Battle of Halidon Hill (1333). The material on Harold Harefoot is rather unflattering. The author considered both Harold and Harthacnut to have been sons of Cnut and Emma of Normandy. He proceeds to portray Harold as follows: "...He went astray from the qualities and conduct of his father King Cnut, for he cared not at all for knighthood, for courtesy, or for honour, but only for his own will...". He accuses Harold of driving his own mother Emma out of England, by the advice of Godwin, Earl of Wessex. He paints Harthacnut in a more favourable light.

The Knýtlinga saga (13th century) considers Harold Harefoot to be the oldest son of Cnut and Emma of Normandy, though its author frequently misrepresents family relationships. Harthacnut and Gunhilda of Denmark are regarded in the text as his younger siblings. The narrative has Harold and Harthacnut dividing the realms of their father in an agreement. It also features Harold offering hospitality to his half-brother Edward the Confessor, but they were actually step-brothers, and Edward only settled in England following the death of Harold.

== Notes ==
Regnal titles
Preceded by Cnut the Great	King of the English; 1035–1040	Succeeded by Harthacnut
