= Ælfwine Haroldsson =

Illegitimate son of King Harold Harefoot of England

Ælfwine Haroldsson or Ælfwine (fl. 1060–62) was most probably a son of King Harold Harefoot of England. He was probably born during the early 1030s, either in Scandinavia or after 1035 in England. He appears in an early twelfth-century cartulary from the monastery of Sainte Foy at Conques in Aquitaine as Alboynus (a cognate of Ælfwine), alongside the records that he was born in London and was the son of a King Heroldus (a Latinised version of Harold) and one Alveva ("Ælfgifu" Latinised). It is also noted that he arrived in Conques in 1060 on pilgrimage and persuaded the local authorities to rebuild the church and make him its Prior. W. H. Stevenson showed the only chronologically plausible candidate for his father is King Harold Harefoot. With Harold Harefoot's sudden death on 17 March 1040 Ælfwine was most likely left in his otherwise unknown mother's care, or even that of his powerful and influential grandmother Ælfgifu of Northampton, who may be the Ælfgifu of the record mistakenly named as his mother, rather than grandmother. He did not lay any claim to the throne of England.

== Sources ==
- Tim Bolton, "Reign of King Harold Harefoot", The Literary Encyclopedia, 5 May 2006.
- Appears in some sources stating he is King Harold Harefoot's son.
