= Gunhilda of Denmark =

Queen of Germany from 1036 to 1038

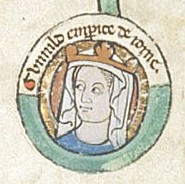
- 13th century portrait

Queen consort of Germany
- Tenure: 1036 – 18 July 1038
- Born: c. 1020
- Died: 18 July 1038 (aged 17–18)
- Burial: Limburg Abbey
- Spouses: Henry III, Holy Roman Emperor
- Issue: Beatrice I, Abbess of Quedlinburg
- House: Jelling dynasty
- Father: Cnut the Great
- Mother: Emma of Normandy

Gunhilda of Denmark (c. 1020 – 18 July 1038), was Queen of Germany as the wife of King Henry III from 1036 until her death.

== Biography ==
Gunhilda was a daughter of King Cnut the Great (985/95 – 1035), ruler over the Anglo-Scandinavian North Sea Empire, and his second wife Emma of Normandy (c. 985 – 1052). She was thus a member of the House of Knýtlinga and a sister of King Harthacnut, a half-sister of King Svein Knutsson of Norway and King Harold Harefoot of England, and Alfred Aetheling, Edward the Confessor and Godgifu (daughter of Æthelred the Unready).

About 1025, Gunhilda came to Germany as a child. Her engagement with Henry III, the son and heir of Emperor Conrad II and his consort Gisela of Swabia, was part of a pact of her father Cnut over peaceful borders of the Danish Duchy of Schleswig with Imperial Holstein in the area of Kiel. The agreement had occurred prior to the death of Cnut in 1035.

=== Queen ===
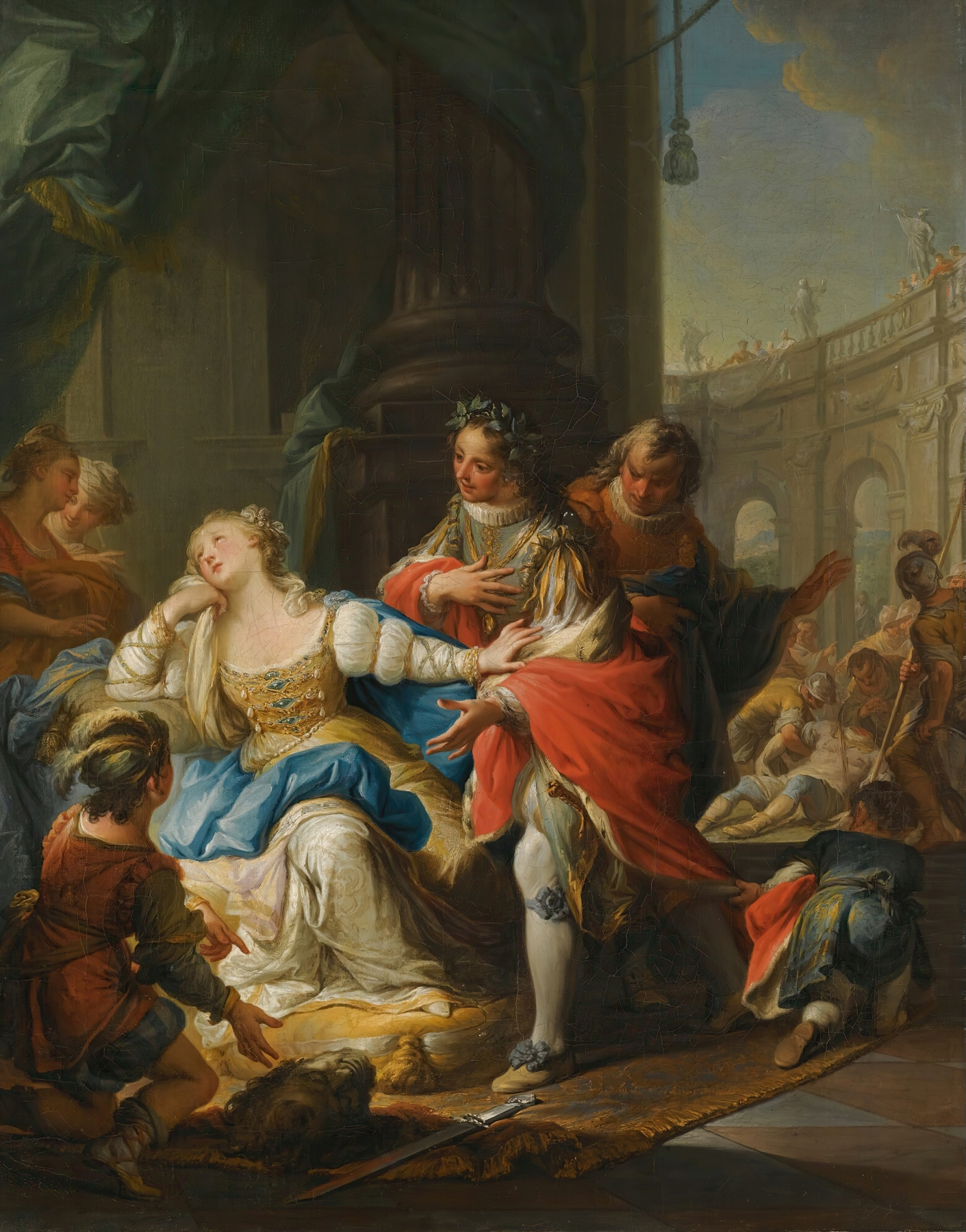
An 18th century painting by Andrea Casali depicting the trial by combat as described in the chronicles of de Trois-Fontaines and Malmesbury.

During the Easter celebration in 1028, Henry received regality from the hands of his father with consent of the princes and was vested with the duchies of Bavaria and Swabia. Conrad temporarily had evolved plans to marry his son with Zoe Porphyrogenita, a daughter of the Byzantine Emperor Constantine VIII. Nevertheless, after these ambitions had failed, Gunhilda and Henry were finally betrothed at Pentecost 1035 in Bamberg and married one year later in Nijmegen. Upon her wedding, she took the German name Kunigunde.

According to the chronicles of Alberic de Trois-Fontaines and William of Malmesbury, Gunhilda was accused of adultery and defended in trial by combat, but after her champion's victory she disdained the success and became a nun. However, it seems that Gunhilda and her husband reconciled shortly afterwards.

In December 1036, Emperor Conrad went on a campaign to Italy, while Empress Gisela together with Henry and Gunhilda celebrated Christmas in Regensburg. Stuck in a fierce conflict with quarrelsome Archbishop Aribert of Milan, Conrad asked his son for support and both Henry III and Gunhilda followed him on his expedition. In Italy, Gunhilda gave birth to the couple's only daughter, Beatrice (d. 1061), who later became Abbess of Quedlinburg and Gandersheim.

While the siege of Milan proved unsuccessful, Emperor Conrad in 1038 was asked to intervene in a territorial dispute between Guaimar IV of Salerno and Pandulf IV of Capua. He campaigned in the Mezzogiorno in support of Guaimar, took Capua and had Pandulf deposed. Their victory found most of the Mezzogiorno loyal to the Holy Roman Empire.

During the return journey to Germany, an epidemic (possibly malaria) broke out among the Imperial troops, which claimed many victims. Duke Herman IV of Swabia and Gunhilda were among the casualties.

According to Hermman of Reichenau's Chronicle Gunhilda's body was brought to the Salian family monastery, a fortress located on the Hardt at Limburg, in Germany. As her husband was not crowned King of the Romans until the death of his father Emperor Conrad II in 1039, Gunhilda was never crowned German queen.

== Ancestry ==
Ancestors of Gunhilda of Denmark

8. Harald I of Denmark
4. Sweyn Forkbeard
9. Gunhild ?
2. Cnut the Great
10. Mieszko I of Poland
5. Sigrid the Haughty
11. Doubravka of Bohemia
1. Gunhilda of Denmark
12. William I, Duke of Normandy
6. Richard I, Duke of Normandy
13. Sprota
3. Emma of Normandy
7. Gunnor

== Notes ==
Gunhilda of Denmark House of Knýtlinga Born: c. 1020 Died: 18 July 1038
German royalty
Preceded by Gisela of Swabia	Queen consort of Germany; 1036–1038	Succeeded by Agnes of Poitou
