= Harthacnut =

King of England (1040–42) and Denmark (1035–42)

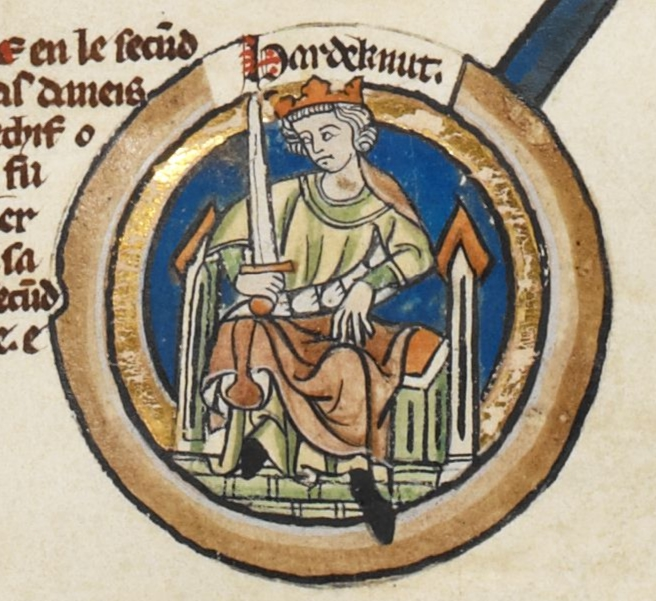
- Harthacnut in the 14th-century Genealogical Roll of the Kings of England

King of Denmark
- Reign: 12 November 1035 – 8 June 1042
- Predecessor: Cnut the Great
- Successor: Magnus I

King of England
- Reign: 1040 – 8 June 1042
- Predecessor: Harold I
- Successor: Edward the Confessor
- Born: c. 1018; England
- Died: 8 June 1042 (aged 23–24); Lambeth, England
- Burial: Aarhus Cathedral, Denmark
- House: Knýtlinga
- Father: Cnut the Great
- Mother: Emma of Normandy

Harthacnut (Note: He was titled as Harthacnut in England, while in Denmark and Norway he ruled as Cnut III (Danish: Hardeknud); sometimes spelled Harðacnut, Harthacanute, Hardicanute, Hardecanute, Hordaknut, or Hörthaknútr ('Tough-knot')) (c. 1018 – 8 June 1042) was King of Denmark from 1035, and King of England from 1040 until his death in 1042. He was the last monarch of the North Sea Empire, an empire consisting of England and Denmark, and was also the last monarch of the House of Knýtlinga.

Harthacnut was the son of King Cnut the Great, who ruled Denmark, Norway, and England, and Emma of Normandy. After Cnut's death in 1035, Harthacnut faced challenges in retaining his father's territories. Magnus I seized control of Norway, while Harthacnut succeeded as King of Denmark. In 1040, following the death of his half-brother Harold Harefoot, he became King of England. Harthacnut died suddenly in 1042 and was succeeded by Magnus in Denmark and Edward the Confessor in England. He was the last Dane to rule England.

== Early life ==
Harthacnut was born shortly after the marriage of his parents in July or August 1017. Cnut had set aside his first wife, Ælfgifu of Northampton, to marry Emma, and according to the Encomium Emmae Reginae, a book she commissioned many years later, Cnut agreed that any sons from this marriage would take precedence over the sons of his first marriage. In 1023, Emma and Harthacnut played a leading role in the translation of the body of the martyr St Ælfheah from London to Canterbury. Harthacnut's biographer, Ian Howard, sees this event as recognition of his position as Cnut's heir in England.

In the 1020s, Denmark faced threats from Norway and Sweden. In 1026, Cnut decided to strengthen its defences by sending his eight-year-old son to Denmark as the future king under a council headed by his brother-in-law, Earl Ulf. Ulf alienated Cnut by persuading the Danish provinces to acknowledge Harthacnut as king without reference to Cnut's overall authority and by failing to take vigorous measures against Norwegian and Swedish invasions, instead waiting for Cnut's assistance. In 1027, Cnut arrived with a fleet, forgave Harthacnut his insubordination in view of his youth, but had Ulf murdered. He drove the invaders out of Denmark and established his authority over Norway, returning to England in 1028 and leaving Denmark under Harthacnut's rule.

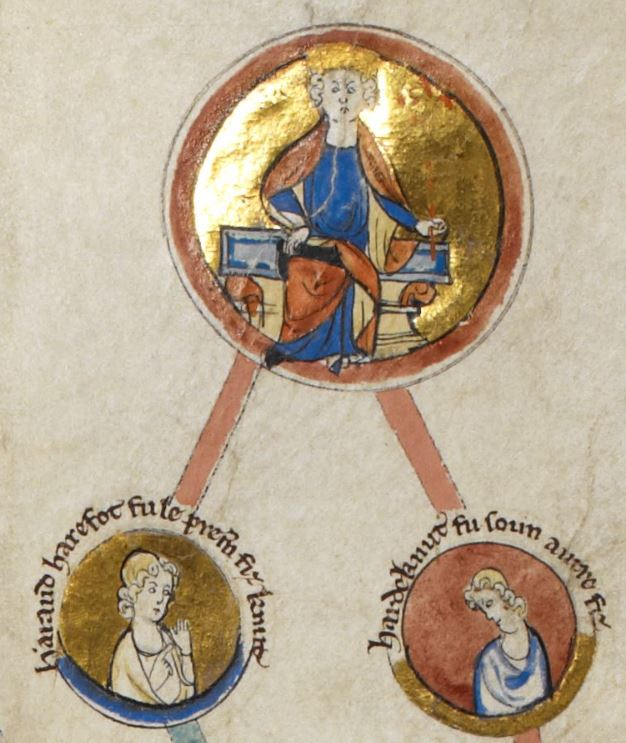
Cnut, king of England, Denmark, and Norway, with his sons Harold Harefoot and Harthacnut

Cnut had left Norway under the rule of Håkon Eiriksson, who drowned in a shipwreck in 1029 or 1030. Cnut then appointed his son Svein to rule Norway with the assistance of Ælfgifu, Cnut's first wife and Svein's mother. They made themselves unpopular through heavy taxation and by favouring Danish advisers over the Norwegian nobility. When King Magnus I of Norway, the son of former King Olaf, invaded in 1035, Svein and Ælfgifu were forced to flee to Harthacnut's court. Harthacnut was a close ally of Svein, but he did not consider his resources sufficient to launch an invasion of Norway. The half-brothers sought help from their father, only to learn of his death in November 1035.

== Reign of Harold Harefoot ==
In 1035, Harthacnut succeeded his father as king of Denmark. It is unclear whether he was intended to have England as well, and he was unable to come to the country because his position in Denmark was under threat. At a meeting following Cnut's death, his mother and Godwin, the powerful earl of Wessex, urged acceptance of Harthacnut even though he was absent, but magnates north of the Thames supported Cnut's son by Ælfgifu, Harold Harefoot. It was decided that Harold should act as regent for both, and that Emma should hold Wessex for her son. The arrangement is reflected in the coinage: mints south of the Thames produced silver pennies in Harthacnut's name, while those to the north were almost all Harold's. In late 1037, because Harthacnut was still absent, Harold was generally accepted as king, and Emma was sent into exile. She fled to Bruges, where she stayed at the court of the Count of Flanders Baldwin V, who was always eager to meddle in English affairs in order to keep that kingdom politically fragmented and weak.

Harthacnut probably remained in Denmark because of the threat from Magnus of Norway, but the two eventually made a treaty by which, if either died without an heir, his kingdom would pass to the other. This may have freed Harthacnut to pursue his claim to England. In 1039, Harthacnut sailed with ten ships to meet his mother in Bruges, and following Harold's death in March 1040. Envoys crossed the Channel to offer Harthacnut the throne.

== Reign ==
=== Return to England ===
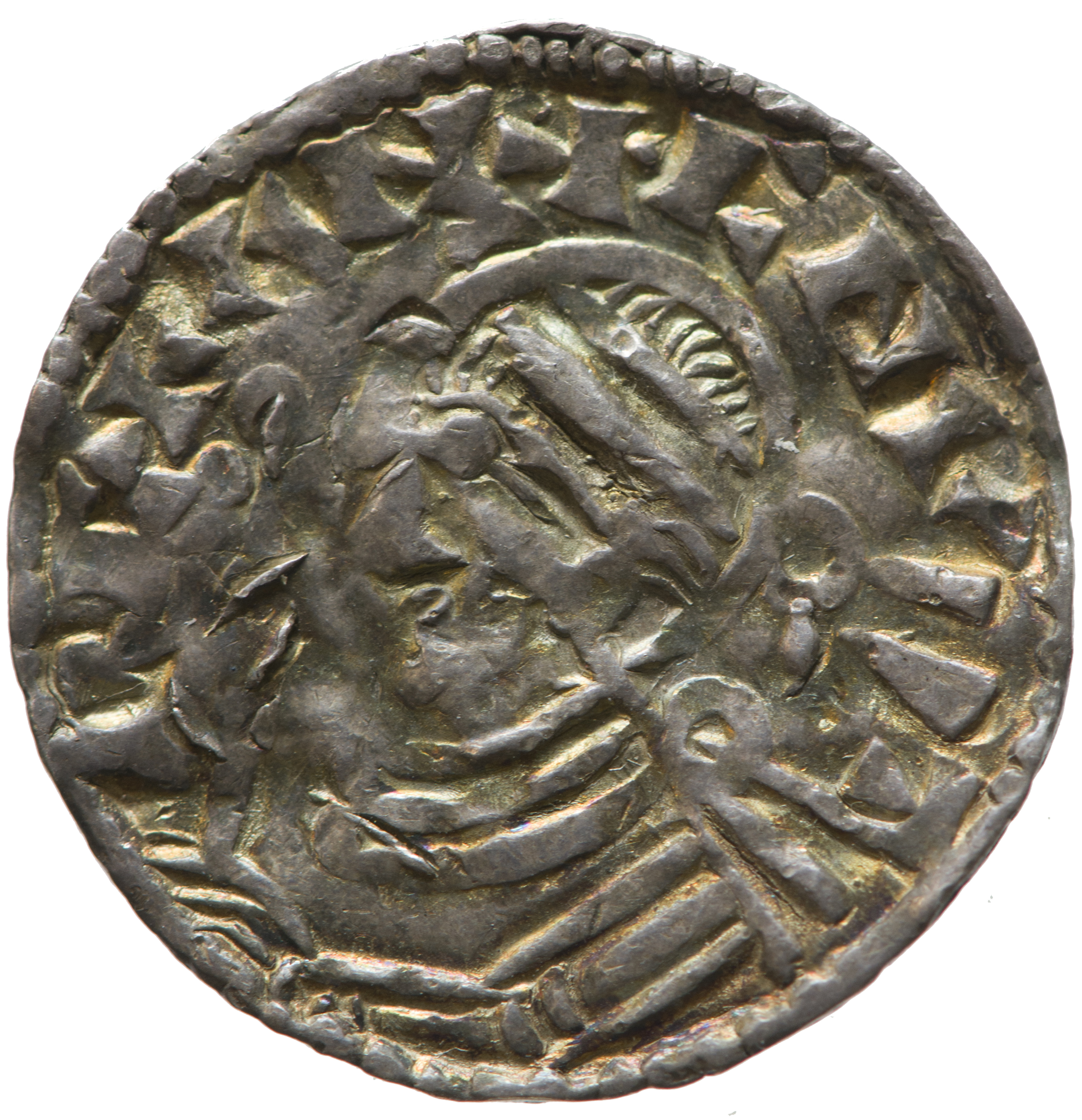
Silver penny of Harthacnut

Harold died on 17 March 1040 and soon afterwards Harthacnut travelled to England with his mother, landing at Sandwich on 17 June, "seven days before Midsummer", in a peaceful arrival despite commanding a fleet of 62 warships. Although invited to take the throne, he came prepared as a conqueror. To reward the crews for their service, he levied a geld of over 21,000 pounds, a considerable sum that made him unpopular, although it was only a quarter of the amount his father had raised under similar circumstances in 1017–1018.

Harthacnut had been horrified by Harold's murder of Alfred, and his mother demanded vengeance. With the approval of Harold's former councillors, Harold's body was disinterred from its place of honour at Westminster and publicly beheaded. It was disposed of in a sewer, but later retrieved and thrown into the Thames, from which London shipmen rescued it and had it buried in a churchyard. Godwin had been complicit in the crime, having handed over Alfred to Harold. Queen Emma charged him in a trial before Harthacnut and his council. The king allowed Godwin to escape punishment after witnesses testified he had acted on Harold's orders, but Godwin later gave Harthacnut a richly decorated ship as wergild. Bishop Lyfing of Worcester was also charged with complicity and deprived of his see, but in 1041 he reconciled with Harthacnut and was restored.

The English were accustomed to a king ruling in council with the advice of his chief men, but Harthacnut had ruled autocratically in Denmark and was unwilling to change, particularly as he did not fully trust the leading earls. Initially, he successfully intimidated his subjects, though his influence waned later in his short reign. He doubled the size of the English fleet from sixteen to thirty-two ships, partly to secure forces capable of handling troubles elsewhere in his empire, and to fund it he sharply increased taxation. The increase coincided with a poor harvest, causing severe hardship. In 1041, two tax collectors in and around Worcester were killed by rioting townspeople. Harthacnut responded by ordering a then-legal but highly unpopular "harrying": he instructed his earls to burn the town and kill the population. Few were killed, as most had fled in advance. Citizens who had taken refuge on an island in the River Severn successfully resisted Harthacnut's troops and were allowed to return to their homes without further punishment.

The earl of Northumbria was Siward, but Earl Eadwulf of Bamburgh ruled the northern part semi-independently, a situation displeasing to the autocratic Harthacnut. In 1041, Eadwulf offended the king for an unknown reason but sought reconciliation. Harthacnut promised safe conduct but colluded in Eadwulf's murder by Siward, who then became earl of the whole of Northumbria. The crime was widely condemned; the Anglo-Saxon Chronicle described it as "a betrayal" and the king as an "oath-breaker".

Harthacnut was generous to the church. Very few contemporary documents survive, but a royal charter transferred land to Bishop Ælfwine of Winchester, and he made several grants to Ramsey Abbey. The 12th-century Ramsey Chronicle praises his generosity and character.

== Death ==
Harthacnut had suffered from bouts of illness even before becoming King of England. He may have suffered from tuberculosis and was likely aware that his life expectancy was limited. In 1041, he invited his half-brother Edward the Confessor—his mother Emma's son by Æthelred the Unready—back from exile in Normandy. The Anglo-Saxon Chronicle reports that Edward was sworn in as king. Historian M. K. Lawson notes: "This may mean that Edward was recognized as heir of Harthacnut, who had neither wife nor children, and who is said by the slightly later Norman historian William of Poitiers to have suffered from frequent illness. The likely truth of this is suggested not only by his sudden death the following year, but also because it is otherwise difficult to see why a man in his early twenties with a normal life expectancy should have acted so." Harthacnut may also have been influenced by Emma, who sought to preserve her power by ensuring that one of her sons was succeeded by the other. Historian John Maddicott comments that Harthacnut must have sanctioned Edward's return and may even have promoted it, but Tom Licence disputes this, suggesting that Edward was summoned by leading magnates who had lost confidence in Harthacnut and effectively forced Edward upon him. Licence adds that no contemporary source indicates that Harthacnut was dying.

On 8 June 1042, Harthacnut attended a wedding in Lambeth. The groom was Tovi the Proud, and the bride was Gytha, daughter of Osgod Clapa; both men had been close to Cnut. According to the Anglo-Saxon Chronicle, "Harthacnut died as he stood at his drink, and he suddenly fell to the earth with an awful convulsion; and those who were close by took hold of him, and he spoke no word afterwards". Licence suggests that the death does not appear to have been that of a chronically ill man.

== Succession ==
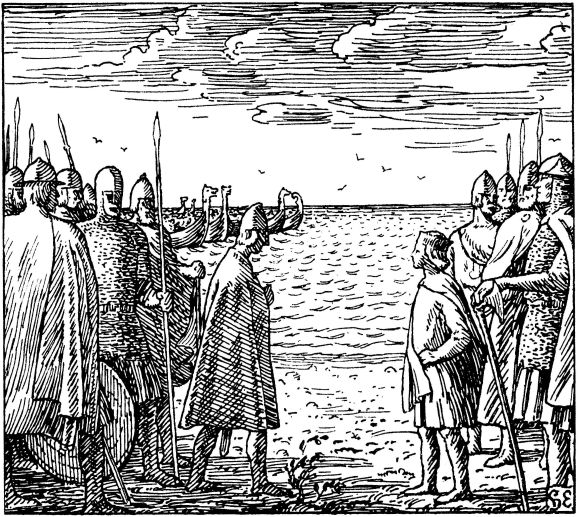
Harthacnut (left) meeting the young King Magnus the Good at the Göta älv river in modern-day Sweden. Illustration by Halfdan Egedius.

The political agreement between Harthacnut and Magnus the Good included the appointment of Magnus as Harthacnut's heir. At the time, this arrangement applied only to the throne of Denmark. According to the Heimskringla, when Harthacnut died, Magnus extended his claim to England. He reportedly sent a letter to Edward the Confessor, asserting his claim to the English throne and threatening invasion. Magnus’s own heir, Harald Hardrada, would later pursue this claim as well. Both considered themselves legal successors to Harthacnut. The Fagrskinna records Magnus proclaiming: "I will take possession of all the Danish empire or else die in the attempt."

According to the Encomium Emmae Reginae, Edward had already served as co-ruler of England since 1041. The work emphasizes Harthacnut, Edward, and Emma acting as a trinity of rulers, in emulation of the Holy Trinity. Edward, by surviving Harthacnut, would automatically inherit the kingship. The Heimskringla depicts Edward presenting himself as brother and legal heir to both Harold Harefoot and Harthacnut, noting that he had already secured "the support of all the people of the country". Unstated in these accounts is that Edward’s eventual marriage to Edith of Wessex strengthened his claim by gaining the political backing of her father, Godwin, Earl of Wessex, and an additional connection to Cnut, as she was a niece of the king.

The Fagrskinna emphasizes Edward’s strong familial claim: as the son of Æthelred the Unready and Emma of Normandy, half-brother of Harthacnut, stepbrother of Harold Harefoot, and stepson of Cnut, he was closely tied to multiple royal lines. England’s leading nobles had already acknowledged him as king, and he was consecrated by an archbishop. He was thus widely regarded as the legitimate ruler. According to the saga, Magnus was warned: "You can never be called king in England, and you will never be granted any allegiance there before you put an end to my life." This reportedly caused Magnus to doubt the strength of his claim.

The planned marriage between Gunhilda of Denmark, Harthacnut’s sister, and Henry III, Holy Roman Emperor was intended to allow their descendants to claim the Danish throne, and potentially the English throne. From Henry’s perspective, it was likely designed to give the Holy Roman Empire influence over Denmark and the western Baltic region. Gunhilda died in 1038 with no known sons. Her only daughter, Beatrice I, Abbess of Quedlinburg, never married.

== Reputation ==
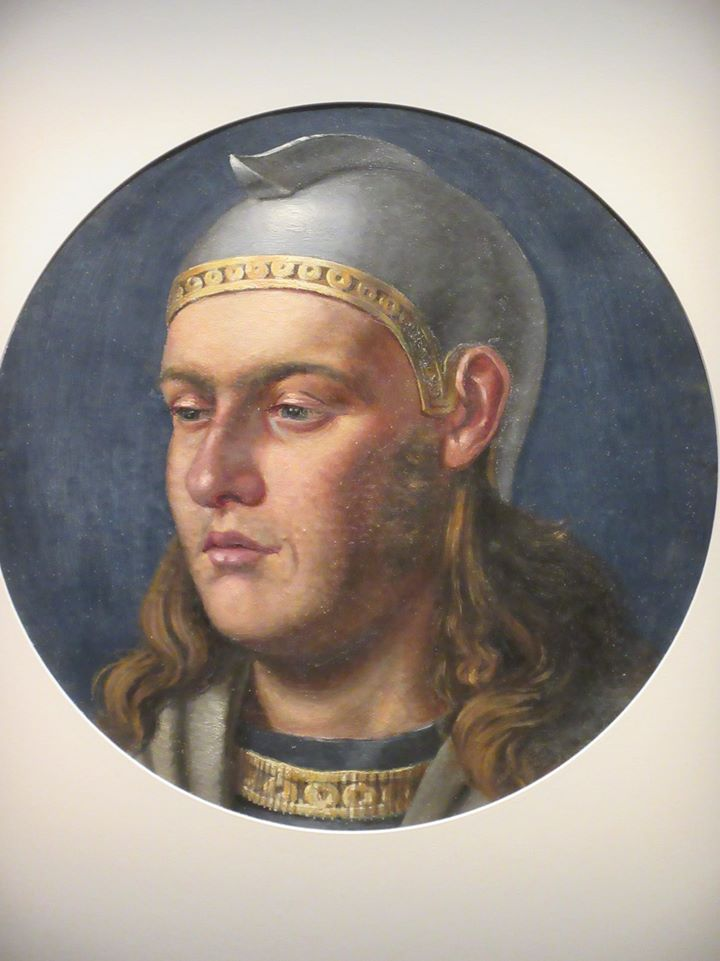
A painting of Harthacnut by Christen Nielsen Overgaard from around 1880, commissioned by The Museum of National History at Frederiksborg Castle.

Apart from the Ramsey Chronicle, medieval sources are generally hostile to Harthacnut. According to the Anglo-Saxon Chronicle, he "did nothing worthy of a king as long as he ruled". Modern historians, however, are less dismissive. M. K. Lawson notes that Harthacnut possessed at least two key attributes of a successful medieval king: he was "both ruthless and feared"; had he lived longer, the Norman Conquest might not have occurred. Ian Howard praises him for maintaining peace throughout his empire, benefiting trade and merchants, and ensuring a smooth succession by inviting Edward to his court as heir. Howard suggests that, had he lived longer, Harthacnut might have become a successful king comparable to his father.

Henry of Huntingdon (12th century) claimed that Harthacnut ordered his court's dining tables to be "laid four times a day with royal sumptuousness", which O'Brien considers likely a popular myth. Henry framed this in the context of sharing meals with his household, suggesting that Harthacnut was more generous than contemporaries, who "through avarice, or as they pretend through disgust, ... set but one meal a day before their dependents". This account contributed to Harthacnut’s image as a "very generous bon viveur". In contrast, Ranulf Higden (14th century) viewed the practice negatively, claiming Harthacnut insisted on two dinners and two suppers daily, influencing the English to be gluttonous and extravagant. Harthacnut’s association with gluttony was well known enough to appear in Walter Scott’s 1819 novel Ivanhoe, where Cedric remarks about Athelstane: "The soul of Hardicanute hath taken possession of him, and he hath no pleasure save to fill, to swill, and to call for more."

The Knýtlinga saga treats Harthacnut’s death as the end of an ancient line of kings and notes that he was the last Danish king to rule England. Otherwise, he is treated as a minor figure, with far more attention given to Cnut. The Morkinskinna covers Harthacnut’s death in some detail but provides almost no information about his life, suggesting a lack of memorable achievements due to his short reign.

The Brut Chronicle is an Anglo-Norman work covering British and English monarchs from Brut (Brutus of Troy) to the death of Henry III in 1272. It was probably composed during the reign of Edward I (reigned 1272–1307), although the oldest surviving manuscript dates to 1338. The text contains numerous errors, and the original author remains unknown, though several continuations extend the narrative to the Battle of Halidon Hill (1333). The material on Harthacnut is largely positive. The author portrays Harold Harefoot as lacking chivalry, courtesy, and honour, while Harthacnut is depicted as "a noble knight and stalwart of body, and he greatly loved knighthood and all virtues". He praises Harthacnut’s generosity with food and drink, noting that his table was open "for all who wished to come to his court to be richly served with royal dishes". The chronicle also commends Harthacnut for accepting his mother, Emma, back to court, highlighting his loyalty as a son.

== Sources ==
- Darlington, Reginald; McGurk, Patrick, eds. (1995). The Chronicle of John of Worcester (in Latin and English). Vol. 2. Oxford, UK: Clarendon Press. ISBN 978-0-19-822261-3.
- Finlay, Alison (2004). Fagrskinna: A Catalogue of the Kings of Norway. BRILL. ISBN 90-04-13172-8. Archived from the original on 11 September 2023. Based primarily on Einarsson's 1984 edition.
- Fjalldal, Magnús (2005). Anglo-Saxon England in Icelandic Medieval Texts. University of Toronto Press. ISBN 978-0-8020-3837-1. Archived from the original on 11 September 2023.
- Given-Wilson, Chris (2004). Chronicles: The Writing of History in Medieval England. A&C Black. ISBN 978-1-85285-358-7. Archived from the original on 11 September 2023.
- Howard, Ian (2008). Harthacnut: The Last Danish King of England. The History Press.
- John, Eric (1996). Reassessing Anglo-Saxon England. Manchester University Press. ISBN 978-0-7190-5053-4. Archived from the original on 11 September 2023.
- Kerr, Julie (2007). Stephen Morillo Diane Korngiebel (ed.). "Food, Drink, and Lodging:Hospitality in Twelfth-Century England". The Haskins Society Journal: Studies in Medieval History. 18. Boydell Press: 72–92. ISBN 978-1-84383-336-9. Archived from the original on 11 September 2023.
- Lawson, M. K. (23 September 2004). "Harthacnut (Hardecanute) (c.1018–1042)". Oxford Dictionary of National Biography (online ed.). Oxford University Press. doi:10.1093/ref:odnb/12252. (Subscription, Wikipedia Library access or UK public library membership required.)
- Maddicott, John (June 2004). "Edward the Confessor's Return to England in 1041". Anglo-Saxon England. CXIX (482): 650–666. ISSN 0263-6751.
- Licence, Tom (2020). Edward the Confessor: Last of the Royal Blood. New Haven, Connecticut: Yale University Press. ISBN 978-0-300-21154-2.
- Lund, Niels (24 August 2017), "Knud 3. Hardeknud", Den Store Danske, Gyldendal, archived from the original on 11 September 2023
- Marvin, Julia (2006). Brut. Boydell Press. ISBN 978-1-84383-274-4. Archived from the original on 11 September 2023.
- O'Brien, Harriet (2006). Queen Emma and the Vikings: The Woman Who Shaped the Events of 1066. Bloomsbury. ISBN 978-0-7475-7968-7. Archived from the original on 11 September 2023.
- Oksanen, Eljas (2012). Flanders and the Anglo-Norman World, 1066–1216. Cambridge University Press. ISBN 978-0-521-76099-7.
- Scott, Walter (1998). Ivanhoe. Edinburgh University Press. ISBN 978-0-7486-0573-6. Archived from the original on 11 September 2023.
- Stenton, Frank (1971) [1943]. Anglo-Saxon England (3rd ed.). Oxford, UK: Oxford University Press. ISBN 978-0-19-821716-9.
- Swanton, Michael, ed. (2000). The Anglo-Saxon Chronicles (revised paperback ed.). London, UK: Phoenix. ISBN 978-1-84212-003-3.

Regnal titles
Preceded by Cnut the Great	King of Denmark; 1035–1042	Succeeded by Magnus the Good
Preceded by Harold I	King of England; 1040–1042	Succeeded by Edward the Confessor
