= Ælfgifu of Northampton =

Regent of Norway from 1030 to 1035

Ælfgifu

Regent of Norway
- Tenure: 1030–1035
- Born: c. 990
- Died: After 1036
- Spouse: Cnut the Great
- Issue: Svein Knutsson; Harold Harefoot
- Father: Ælfhelm, Ealdorman of York
- Mother: Wulfrun?

Ælfgifu of Northampton (Old Norse: Alfífa; c. 990 – after 1036) was the first wife of Cnut the Great, King of England and Denmark, and mother of Harold Harefoot, King of England. She was regent of Norway from 1030 to 1035.

== Biography ==
=== Family background ===
Ælfgifu was born into an important noble family based in the Midlands (Mercia). She was a daughter of Ælfhelm, ealdorman of southern Northumbria, and his wife Wulfrun. Ælfhelm was killed in 1006, probably at the command of King Æthelred the Unready, and Ælfgifu's brothers, Ufegeat and Wulfheah, were blinded. Wulfric Spot, a wealthy nobleman and patron of Burton Abbey, was the brother of Ælfhelm or Wulfrun. The family again came under suspicion during the invasion of England by Swein Forkbeard, King of Denmark, in 1013–14, and further members were charged with treachery and killed. It is possible that Ælfgifu was a kinswoman of the wife of Ælfgar, Earl of Mercia, also called Ælfgifu.

=== Marriage to Cnut ===
When Swein invaded, northern peoples, some of them of Scandinavian descent, immediately submitted to him. He then married his young son Cnut to Ælfgifu to seal their loyalty. Swein went on to conquer the whole of England and was accepted as King, but he died in February 1014 after a reign of only five weeks. Æthelred then sent an army which forced Cnut to flee back to Denmark, and in the opinion of historian Ian Howard, he left his wife and their baby son, Svein, the future King of Norway, behind with her family. They were anxious to make their peace with Æthelred, but unwilling to hand Ælfgifu and her son over to Æthelred to be killed, so they sent the mother and child with King Swein's body to Denmark. There she became pregnant again, and in 1015 or 1016 she gave birth to Harold Harefoot. In the period immediately following, she may have been given authority over some region of Denmark, perhaps that of a Danish-controlled area of the Baltic coastline.

Her two sons were to figure prominently in the empire which their father built in northern Europe, though not without opposition. After his conquest of England in 1016, Cnut married Emma of Normandy, the widow of King Æthelred. It was then regarded as acceptable to put aside one wife and take another if the first wife was acquired through the non-Christian pagan ceremony of "handfasting" and nearly always for reasons of political advantage, a practice which might be described as "serial monogamy"; this was the case with the marriage of Ælfgifu to Cnut. The status of Cnut's two marriages and their social context in England and Scandinavia has been discussed recently by Timothy Bolton. Emma's sons, Edward and Ælfred by Æthelred and Harthacnut by Cnut, were also claimants to the throne of her husband. Exactly how the second marriage affected Ælfgifu's status as Cnut's first consort is unknown, but there is no evidence to suggest that she was repudiated.

=== Regent in Norway (1030–35) ===
After the defeat and death of Olaf II of Norway by forces loyal to Cnut, Cnut sent Ælfgifu with their eldest son Svein to rule Norway, in 1030. Their rule was, however, so harsh that the Norwegians rebelled against them. They were driven out, in 1034 or 1035, while Svein died of wounds in Denmark shortly after, probably in 1036. In Norway, where she was known as Alfífa in Old Norse, this period entered history as 'Alfífa's time' (Alfífuǫld), remembered for her severe rule and heavy taxation. In the Norwegian Ágrip, for instance, the following verse is attributed to her contemporary, the skald Sigvatr:

Ælfgyfu's time
long will the young man remember,
when they at home ate ox's food,
and like the goats, ate rind;

=== Succession crisis after the death of Cnut (1035) ===
Cnut died at Shaftesbury in 1035. Symeon of Durham and Adam of Bremen suggest that Cnut had reserved the English throne for Harold, while the Encomium Emmae Reginae, written to defend Harthacnut's mother, Emma, claims that he had done so for Harthacnut. Ælfgifu was determined that her second son Harold should be the next English king. She had returned to England (at least) by 1036, while Emma's son Harthacnut was away in Denmark, at war with the Norwegian king Magnus I, and the Swedes under their king Anund Jacob. Emma's other sons, Ælfred and Edward, stayed in Normandy. With help from her supporters, Ælfgifu was able to secure the throne for her son. In the view of Frank Stenton, she was probably the real ruler of England for part, if not the whole, of his reign. However, this interpretation is disputed: "Harold is depicted as ruling autonomously in the sparse entries of the Anglo-Saxon Chronicle, as well as in one of the only surviving documents from his reign, known as S 1467...Given the scarcity of surviving material from the reign, it is hard to say what role Aelfgifu played in her son's administration".

The Anglo-Saxon Chronicle (versions C, D and E) describes how Harold and his men forcefully laid claim on the treasury housed in Winchester, where Cnut was buried and Emma (whom the Anglo-Saxons also referred to as "Ælfgifu" the queen) had taken up residence:

1035: Here King Cnut died, and his son Harold succeeded to the kingdom. He departed at Shaftesbury on 12 November, and he was conveyed to Winchester, and there buried. And Ælfgifu, the Lady, settled inside there [Winchester]. And Harold said that he was the son of Cnut and the Northampton Ælfgifu – although it was not true. He sent and had taken from her all the best treasures which King Cnut possessed.

Manuscript E, which is known for its Godwinist sympathies, adds a number of details, including the assembly at Oxford in 1037 at which Harold was elected king of England and the mustering of support north of the Thames, where the power base of Ælfgifu's family was concentrated.

1036 [for 1035]: Here Cnut died at Shaftesbury. and he is buried in Winchester in the Old Minster. [...] And soon after his passing, there was a meeting of all the councillors at Oxford, and Earl Leofric and almost all the thegns north of the Thames, and the men of the fleet in London, chose Harold as regent of all England, for himself and his half-brother Harthacnut who was in Denmark, And Earl Godwine and all the foremost men in Wessex opposed it just as long as they could, but they could not contrive anything against it. And then it was decided that Ælfgifu, Harold's mother, should settle in Winchester with the king her son's housecarls, and hold all Wessex in hand for him; and Earl Godwine was their most loyal man. Some men said of Harold that he was son of King Cnut and Ælfgifu, daughter of Ealdorman Ælfhelm, but to many men it seemed quite unbelievable; nevertheless he was full king over all England

During 1036, opinion in England moved towards Harold. By August a report had reached Emma's daughter, Gunnhild, at the German court that her "unhappy and unjust step-mother" (i.e. Ælfgifu) was working to deprive Gunnhild's brother, Harthacnut, of the kingdom by holding great feasts, and trying by argument and gifts to persuade the leading nobles to give their fealty to Harold. Emma's encomiast attributes to her even more seriously dishonest methods. She makes Ælfgifu an accomplice in the murder of Emma's youngest son, Alfred Aetheling, by suggesting that she was responsible for sending a forged letter to Normandy inviting Alfred to England. The Encomium Emmae Reginae also claimed that Ælfgifu's son Harold was a servant's son.

Ælfgifu is not recorded after 1036, apart from a possible reference to her as the "lady", and it is not known when she died.

== Family tree ==
Cnut the Great family tree

Gorm the Old | Thyra | Rollo | Poppa of Bayeux
Harald Bluetooth | Burislav | none recorded | William Longsword | Sprota
Swein Forkbeard | Gunhild of Wenden | Gunnor | Richard I of Normandy
Ælfgifu of Northampton | Cnut the Great | Emma of Normandy | Æthelred the Unready | Ælfgifu of York | Richard II of Normandy | Judith of Brittany
Svein Knutsson | Harold Harefoot | Gunhilda of Denmark | Alfred Ætheling | Edmund Ironside | Ealdgyth | Robert I of Normandy | Herleva
Gytha Thorkelsdóttir | Godwin, Earl of Wessex | Harthacnut | Edward the Exile | Agatha | William the Conqueror | Matilda of Flanders
Sweyn Godwinson | Harold Godwinson | Tostig Godwinson | Edith of Wessex | Edward the Confessor | Edgar Ætheling | Cristina
Gyrth, Gunhild, Ælfgifu, Leofwine & Wulfnoth | Malcolm III of Scotland | Margaret
Other children | Matilda of Scotland | Henry I of England

== Sources ==
=== Primary sources ===
- Anglo-Saxon Chronicle, MSS C, D and E, ed. D. Dumville and S. Keynes, The Anglo-Saxon Chronicle. A Collaborative Edition. Cambridge, 1983; tr. M.J. Swanton, The Anglo-Saxon Chronicles. 2nd ed. London, 2000.
- Encomium Emmae Reginae, ed. and tr. Alistair Campbell, Encomium Emmae Reginae. Cambridge, 1998.
- Letter of Immo, chaplain at the court of Worms, to Bishop Azeko of Worms, preserved in the Lorsch manuscript, Codex Palatinus Latinus 930 (Vatican Library), ed. W. Bulst, Die ältere Wormser Briefsammlung. MGH Epistolae. Die Briefe der deutschen Kaiserzeit 3. Weimar, 1949. 20–22 (no. 5). Available from the Digital MGH.
- William of Malmesbury, Gesta regum Anglorum, ed. and tr. R.A.B. Mynors, R.M. Thomson and M. Winterbottom, William of Malmesbury. Gesta Regum Anglorum. The History of the English Kings. OMT. 2 vols: vol 1. Oxford, 1998.
- Symeon of Durham, Symeonis Monachi Opera Omnia, ed. T. Arnold, 2 vols. London, 1885.
- John of Worcester, Chronicle (of Chronicles), ed. Benjamin Thorpe, Florentii Wigorniensis monachi chronicon ex chronicis. 2 vols. London, 1848–9.
- Ágrip af Nóregskonungasögum §§ 27, 32, 35, ed. and tr. M.J. Driscoll, Ágrip af Nóregskonungasǫgum. Viking Society for Northern Research Text Series 10. 2nd ed. 2008 (1995). Available online from the Viking Society for Northern Research
- Theodoricus monachus, Historia de Antiquitate Regum Norwagiensium, chapter 21, tr. David and Ian McDougall. The Ancient History of the Norwegian Kings. Viking Society for Northern Research, 1998.
- Legendary Óláfs saga helga, ch. 71
- Morkinskinna, ed. Finnur Jónsson. Morkinskinna. Copenhagen: Samfund til udgivelse af gammel nordisk litteratur, 1932.
- Adam of Bremen, Gesta Hammaburgensis ecclesiae pontificum.
- The Chronicle of Hugh Candidus

=== Secondary sources ===
- Ælfgifu 1 at Prosopography of Anglo-Saxon England
- Ælfhelm 17 at Prosopography of Anglo-Saxon England
- Wulfrun 3 at Prosopography of Anglo-Saxon England
- Wulfric 52 at Prosopography of Anglo-Saxon England
- Campbell, M.W. "Queen Emma and Ælfgifu of Northampton. Canute the Great's women". Medieval Scandinavia, 4 (1971): 60–79.
- Rognoni, L. (2004). "Presenza e azione di Ælfgifu di Northampton, regina madre e reggente nell'Impero del Nord di Canuto il Grande (1013–1040)" (in Italian)
- Stafford, Pauline (2004). "Ælfgifu [Ælfgifu of Northampton] (fl. 1006–1036)". Oxford Dictionary of National Biography. Oxford University Press. doi:10.1093/ref:odnb/180. (subscription, Wikipedia Library access or UK public library membership required)
- Stenton, Frank. Anglo-Saxon England. Oxford, 1971. 397–8.
- Stevenson, W.H. "An alleged son of King Harold Harefoot". English Historical Review, 28 (1913): 112–7.
