= Emma of Normandy =

11th-century queen of England, Denmark and Norway

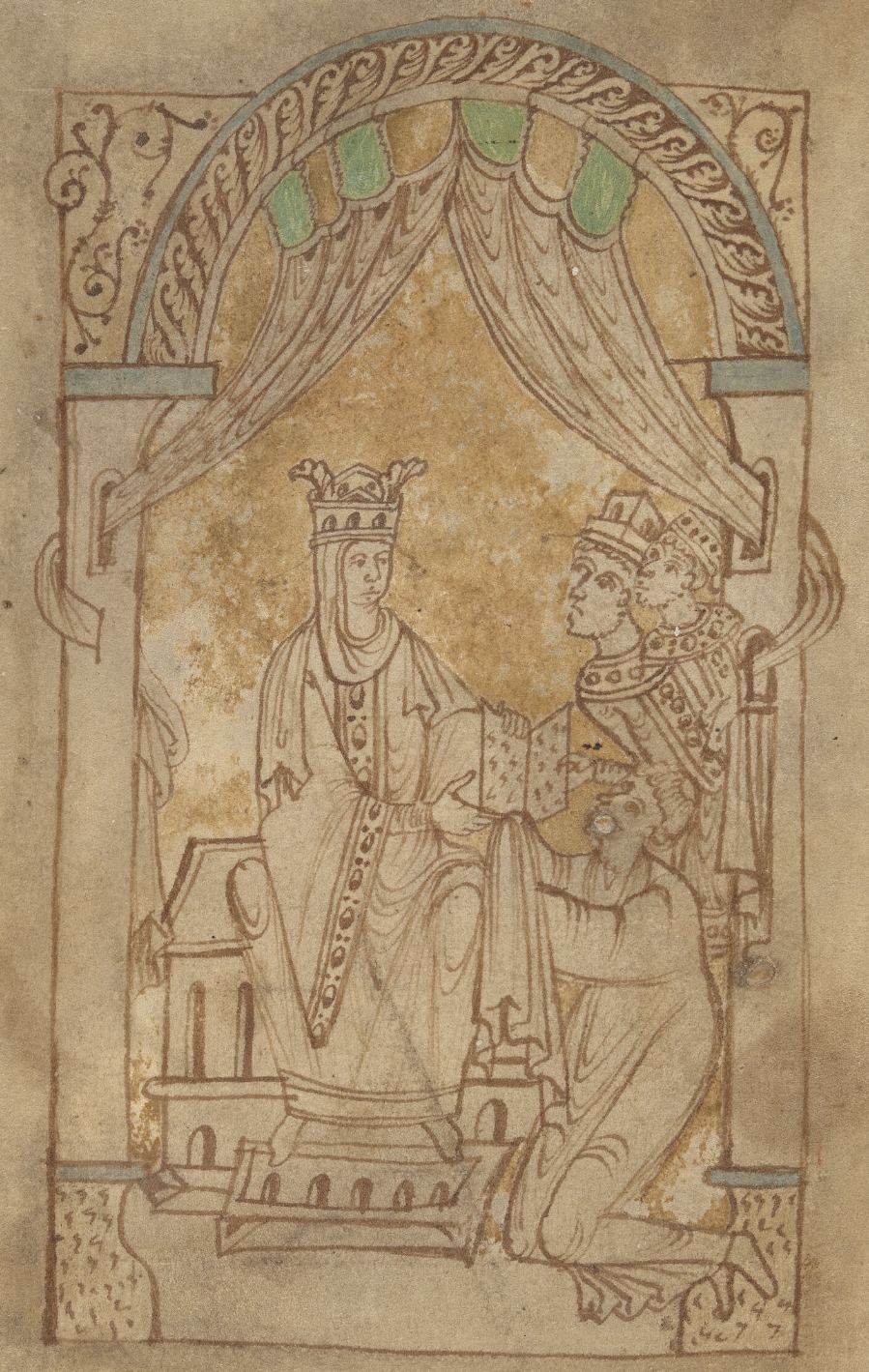
- Emma receiving the Encomium, in The Encomium of Queen Emma, c. 1050, British Library MS 33241

Queen consort of the English
- Tenure: 1002 – summer 1013; 3 February 1014 – 23 April 1016; July 1017 – 12 November 1035

Queen consort of Denmark
- Tenure: 1018 – 12 November 1035

Queen consort of Norway
- Tenure: 1028 – 12 November 1035
- Born: c. 984; Duchy of Normandy
- Died: 6 March 1052 (aged 67–68); Winchester, Hampshire, England
- Burial: Old Minster, Winchester; bones now in Winchester Cathedral
- Spouses: Æthelred the Unready (m. 1002; died 1016) Cnut the Great (m. 1017; died 1035)
- Issue: Edward the Confessor, King of the English; Godgifu, Countess of the Vexin and Boulogne; Alfred Ætheling; Harthacnut, King of the English; Gunhilda, Queen of the Germans
- House: Normandy
- Father: Richard the Fearless
- Mother: Gunnor

Emma of Normandy (referred to as Ælfgifu in royal documents; c. 984 – 6 March 1052) was a Norman-born noblewoman who became the English, Danish, and Norwegian queen through her marriages to the Anglo-Saxon King Æthelred the Unready and the Danish King Cnut the Great. A daughter of the Norman ruler Richard the Fearless and Gunnor, she was Queen of England during her marriage to King Æthelred from 1002 to 1016, except during a brief interruption in 1013–14 when the Danish King Sweyn Forkbeard occupied the English throne. Æthelred died in 1016, and Emma married Sweyn's son Cnut. As Cnut's wife, she was Queen of England from their marriage in 1017, Queen of Denmark from 1018, and Queen of Norway from 1028 until Cnut died in 1035.

After Cnut's death, Emma continued to participate in politics during the reigns of her sons by each husband, Harthacnut and Edward the Confessor. In 1035 when her second husband Cnut died and was succeeded by their son Harthacnut, who was in Denmark at the time, Emma was designated to act as his regent until his return, which she did in rivalry with Harold Harefoot. Emma is the central figure within the Encomium Emmae Reginae, a critical source for the history of early-11th-century English politics. As Catherine Karkov notes, Emma is one of the most visually represented early medieval queens.

== Marriage to Æthelred II ==
In an attempt to pacify Normandy, King Æthelred of England married Emma in 1002 AD. Similarly Richard II, Duke of Normandy, Emma's brother, hoped to improve relations with the English in the wake of recent conflict and a failed kidnapping attempt against him by Æthelred. Viking raids on England were often based in Normandy in the late 10th century, and for Æthelred this marriage was intended to unite against the Viking threat. Upon their marriage, Emma was given the Anglo-Saxon name of Ælfgifu, which was used for formal and official matters, and became Queen of England. She received properties of her own in Winchester, Rutland, Devonshire, Suffolk and Oxfordshire, as well as the city of Exeter.

Æthelred and Emma had two sons, Edward the Confessor and Alfred Ætheling, and a daughter Godgifu.

When King Sweyn Forkbeard of Denmark invaded and conquered England in 1013, Emma and her children were sent to Normandy, where Æthelred soon joined them. They returned to England after Sweyn died in 1014.

Emma and Æthelred's marriage ended with Æthelred's death in London in 1016. Æthelred's oldest son from his first marriage, Æthelstan Ætheling, had been heir apparent until his death in June 1014. Emma's sons had been ranked after all of the sons from Æthelred's first wife, the eldest surviving of whom was Edmund Ironside. Emma attempted to get her older son, Edward, recognized as heir. Although this movement was supported by Æthelred's chief advisor, Eadric Streona, it was opposed by Edmund Ironside, Æthelred's third-oldest son, and his allies, who eventually revolted against his father.

In 1015 Cnut the Great, the son of Sweyn Forkbeard, invaded England. He was held out of London until the deaths in 1016 of Æthelred (April) and Edmund (November). Queen Emma attempted to maintain Anglo-Saxon control of London until her marriage to Cnut was arranged. Some scholars believe that the marriage saved her sons' lives, as Cnut tried to rid himself of rival claimants, but spared their lives.

== Marriage to Cnut ==
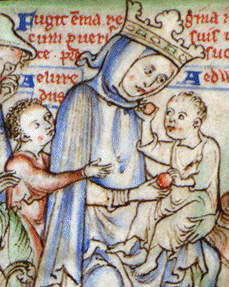
Emma fleeing England with her two young sons following the invasion by Sweyn Forkbeard (1013). Detail of a 13th-century miniature (Fugit emma regina cum pueris suis in normanniam cum pueris suis ut ibidem a duce patre suo protegatur)

Cnut gained control of most of England after he defeated Edmund Ironside on 18 October 1016, at the Battle of Assandun, after which they agreed to divide the kingdom, Edmund taking Wessex and Cnut the rest of the country. Edmund died shortly afterwards on 30 November, and Cnut became the king of all England. At the time of their marriage in 1017, Emma's sons from her marriage to Æthelred were sent to live in Normandy under the tutelage of her brother. At this time Emma became Queen of England again, and later of Denmark and Norway.

The Encomium Emmae Reginae suggests in its second book that Emma and Cnut's marriage, though begun as a political strategy, became an affectionate marriage. During their marriage, Emma and Cnut had a son, Harthacnut, and a daughter, Gunhilda.

== Children ==
During her two marriages Emma had 5 children:

- Edward the Confessor c. 1003 – 5 January 1066, died without issue
- Goda of England c.1004 – c.1049
- Alfred the Noble c. 1005–1036
- Harthacnut
- Gunhilda of Denmark

== Conspiracy regarding the death of Alfred ==
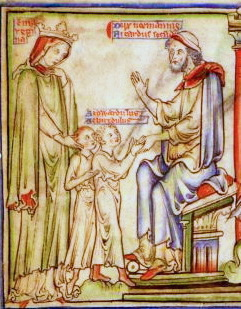
Queen Emma and her sons being received by Duke Richard II of Normandy (Cambridge University Library)

When Cnut died in 1035, there were two candidates for the succession: Cnuts' oldest son by his first wife Harold Harefoot was supported by Leofric, Earl of Mercia and Cnuts' oldest son with Emma, Hartacnut was supported by Emma and Godwin, Earl of Wessex. But as Hartacnut was away, campaigning in Denmark to secure his succession as the king of Denmark, the English nobility appointed Harold as regent for the northern part of the kingdom, and Hartacnut for the southern part. By 1036, Hartacnut had not managed to conclude his Danish campaign and Emma felt her position threatened by Harold. She called her sons by Æthelred, Alfred Aetheling and Edward the Confessor, from their exile in Normandy back to England. But Alfred was captured by Godwin, blinded, and died from his wounds. Edward met armed opposition when he landed in England and fled back to Normandy. Harold became king and Emma felt no longer safe, but could not return to her relatives in Normandy, like she had done previously in 1013, as Edward was already there and held her responsible for Alfred’s death. Instead Emma went in exile to Bruges, where she stayed at the court of Baldwin V of Flanders, who was always willing to meddle in English affairs in order to keep that kingdom politically fragmented and weak.

Encomium Emmae Reginae places the blame of Alfred's capture, torture and murder completely on Harold Harefoot, thinking he intended to rid himself of two more potential claimants to the English throne by killing Edward and Alfred. Some scholars make the argument that it could have been Godwin, Earl of Wessex, who was travelling with Alfred and Edward as their protector in passage.

== Harthacnut's reign ==
Harthacnut, Emma and Cnut's son, assembled a fleet to invade England in 1039, and when Harold died in March 1040 he was invited to become king. He crossed to England with his fleet and Emma. He was criticised by the Anglo-Saxon Chronicle for his heavy taxation to pay for the fleet and for having Harold's body disinterred and thrown into a ditch. In 1041 he invited his half-brother Edward the Confessor to England. The Encomium says that Edward was sworn in as king, which probably means that he was recognised as heir as Harthacnut knew that he did not have long to live. He may have been persuaded to make the invitation by Emma, who would have been keen to preserve her position by ensuring that England was still ruled by a son of hers.

== Edward's reign ==
After Harthacnut's death in June 1042, Edward the Confessor succeeded to the throne and was crowned in April 1043. During the same year, Edward rode to Winchester along with Earls Leofric, Godwin, and Siward, accused Emma of treason, and deprived her of her lands and titles. However, Edward soon relented, and Emma's lands and titles were restored.

== Death and burial ==
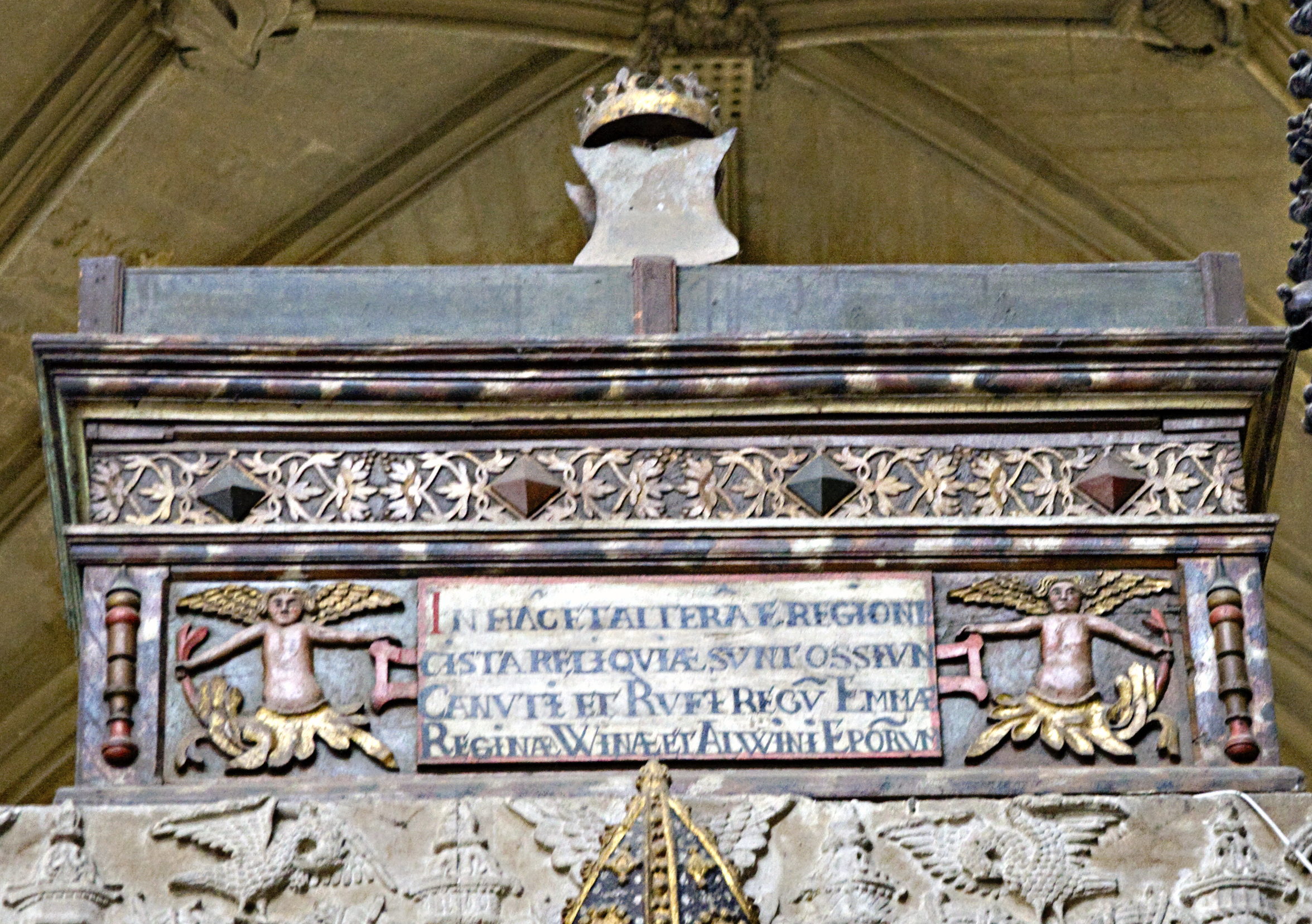
Mortuary chest from Winchester Cathedral, Winchester, England. This is one of six mortuary chests near the altar in the Cathedral; this one claims to contain the bones of Cnut and his wife Emma, along with others. The chest is topped with a crown.

After her death in 1052, Emma was interred alongside Cnut and Harthacnut in the Old Minster, Winchester, before being transferred to the new cathedral built after the Norman Conquest. During the English Civil War (1642–1651), her remains were disinterred and scattered about the Cathedral floor by parliamentary forces. The jumbled bones were later re-interred.

== Queenship ==
As Pauline Stafford noted, Emma is the "first of the early medieval queens" to be depicted through contemporary portraiture. To that end, Emma is the central figure within the Encomium Emmae Reginae (incorrectly titled Gesta Cnutonis Regis during the later Middle Ages) a critical source for the study of English succession in the 11th century. During the reign of Æthelred, Emma most likely served as little more than a figurehead a physical embodiment of the treaty between the English and her Norman father. However, her influence increased considerably under Cnut. Until 1043, writes Stafford, Emma "was the richest woman in England ... and held extensive lands in the East Midlands and Wessex." Emma's authority was not simply tied to landholdings—which fluctuated greatly from 1036 to 1043—she also wielded significant sway over the ecclesiastical offices of England.

== The Encomium Emmæ Reginae or Gesta Cnutonis Regis ==
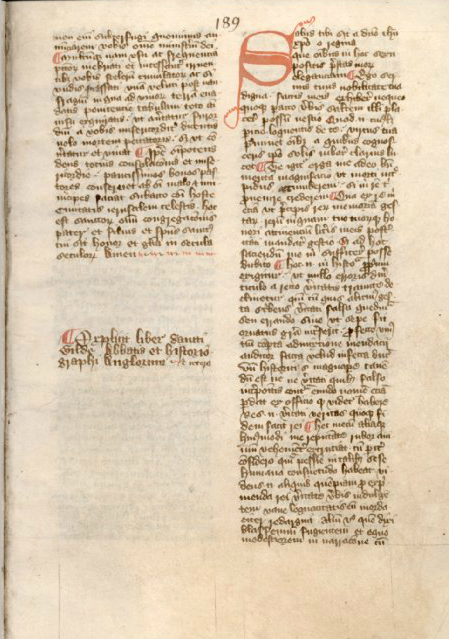
The incipit page of a 14th-century revised version of the Encomium Emmae Reginae manuscript found in 2008, the Courtenay Compendium

The Encomium is divided into three parts, the first of which deals with Sweyn Forkbeard and his conquest of England. The second focuses on Cnut and relates the defeat of "Princes" Æthelred (never named) and Edmund, Cnut's marriage to Emma (again, without mentioning she had been the wife of Æthelred), and Cnut's kingship. The third addresses the events after Cnut's death; Emma's involvement in the seizing of the royal treasury, and the treachery of Earl Godwin. It begins by addressing Emma, "May our Lord Jesus Christ preserve you, O Queen, who excel all those of your sex in the amiability of your way of life." Emma is "the most distinguished woman of her time for delightful beauty and wisdom."

=== Scholarly debate ===
This flattery, writes Elizabeth M. Tyler, is "part of a deliberate attempt to intervene, on Emma's behalf, in the politics of the Anglo-Danish court," a connotation which an 11th-century audience would have understood. This proves to be a direct contrast to earlier evaluations of the text, such as the introduction to the 1998 reprint of Alistair Campbell's 1949 edition in which Simon Keynes remarks:

... While the modern reader who expects the Encomium to provide a portrait of a great and distinguished queen at the height of her power will be disappointed, and might well despair of an author who could suppress, misrepresent, and garble what we know or think to have been the truth.

— Campbell & Keynes 1998, p. xvii

Felice Lifshitz, in her seminal study of the Encomium comments:

... To Alistair Campbell and to see C.N.L. Brooke the omission was explicable as a matter of 'artistic necessity' and of Emma's personal vanity ... both scholars subscribed to the older view, which afforded the Encomium only literary significance as a panegyric to individual or dynasty, but saw no political import.

— Lifshitz 1989, pp. 39–50

=== Manuscripts ===
Prior to May 2008 only one copy of the Encomium was believed to exist. However, a late-14th-century manuscript, the Courtenay Compendium, was discovered in the Devon Record Office, where it had languished since the 1960s. According to a report by the UK Arts Council, "The most significant item [within the text] for British history is the Encomium Emma Reginae ... It is highly probable that the present manuscript represents the most complete witness to the revised version of the Encomium". The manuscript was put up for auction in December 2008, and purchased for £600,000 (5.2 million Danish kroner) on behalf of the Royal Library, Denmark. Unlike the Liber Vitae, the compendium does not contain any images of Emma. The New Minster Liber Vitae, now in the British Library, was completed in 1030, shortly before Cnut's death in 1035. The frontispiece depicts "King Cnut and Queen Emma presenting a cross to the altar of New Minster, Winchester." Stafford in her visual exegesis of the portrait states, "it is not clear whether we should read it as a representation of a powerful woman or a powerless one." In one portrait, each facet of Emma's role as sovereign is displayed; that of a dutiful wife and influential queen.

It has been suggested that the poem Semiramis, possibly written in 1017 by Warner of Rouen at the court of Emma's brother, Richard, Duke of Normandy, and dedicated to her brother, Archbishop Robert, is a contemporary satire ridiculing Emma's relation with Cnut.

Emma is also depicted in a number of later medieval texts, such as the 13th-century Life of Edward the Confessor (Cambridge University Library MS. Ee.3.59) and a 14th-century roll, Genealogy of the English Kings, Genealogical Chronicle of the English Kings.

Emma and her sons Edward and Alfred are characters in the anonymous Elizabethan play Edmund Ironside, sometimes considered an early work by William Shakespeare.

== The Ordeal of Queen Emma ==
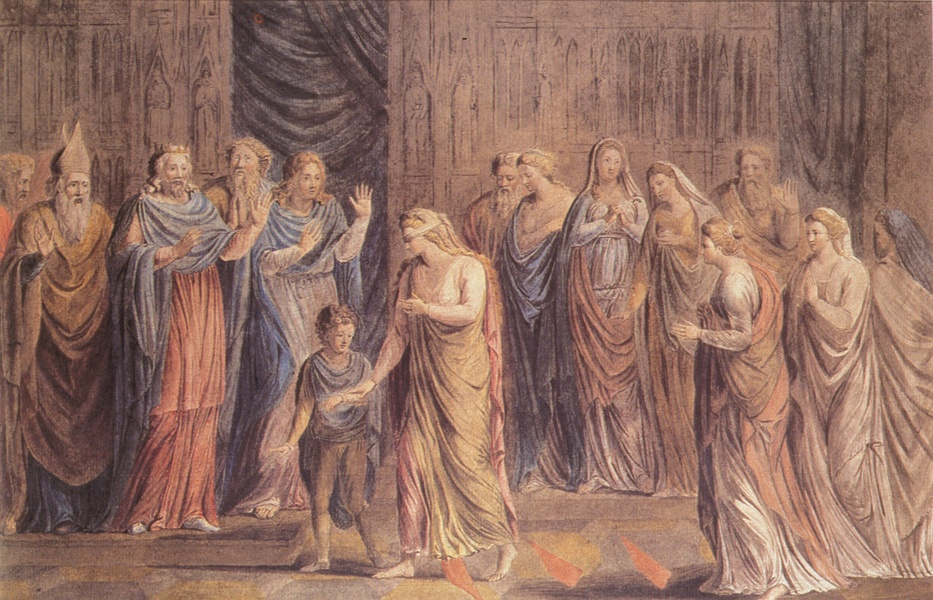
The Ordeal of Queen Emma by William Blake.

The Ordeal of Queen Emma by Fire at Winchester is a legend that seems to have originated in the 13th century. Queen Emma was accused of unchastity with Bishop Ælfwine of Winchester. In order to prove her innocence, she was obliged to undergo the ordeal of walking over nine red-hot ploughshares placed on the pavement of the nave of Winchester Cathedral. Two bishops conducted the barefoot queen to the line of red-hot ploughshares. She walked over the red-hot ploughshares, but, having sought the protection of St Swithun, whose shrine is at Winchester, felt neither the naked iron nor the fire. William Blake did an illustration of the event.

== Family tree ==
Cnut the Great family tree

Gorm the Old	Thyra	Rollo	Poppa of Bayeux
Harald Bluetooth	Burislav	none recorded	William Longsword	Sprota
Swein Forkbeard	Gunhild of Wenden	Gunnor	Richard I of Normandy
Ælfgifu of Northampton	Cnut the Great	Emma of Normandy	Æthelred the Unready	Ælfgifu of York	Richard II of Normandy	Judith of Brittany
Svein Knutsson	Harold Harefoot	Gunhilda of Denmark	Alfred Ætheling	Edmund Ironside	Ealdgyth	Robert I of Normandy	Herleva
Gytha Thorkelsdóttir	Godwin, Earl of Wessex	Harthacnut	Edward the Exile	Agatha	William the Conqueror	Matilda of Flanders
Sweyn Godwinson	Harold Godwinson	Tostig Godwinson	Edith of Wessex	Edward the Confessor	Edgar Ætheling	Cristina
Gyrth, Gunhild, Ælfgifu, Leofwine & Wulfnoth	Malcolm III of Scotland	Margaret
Other children	Matilda of Scotland	Henry I of England

== See also ==
- Emma 2 at Prosopography of Anglo-Saxon England

Emma of Normandy House of Normandy Born: circa 984 Died: 6 March 1052
Preceded by Ælfgifu of York	Queen consort of the English; 1002–1013	Succeeded by Sigrid the Haughty
Preceded by Sigrid the Haughty	Queen consort of the English; 1014–1016	Succeeded by Ealdgyth
Preceded by Ealdgyth as Queen of the English	Queen consort of England; 1016–1035	Succeeded by Edith of Wessex as Queen of the English
None known	Queen consort of Denmark; 1017–1035	Succeeded by Gyda of Sweden
Preceded by Astrid Olofsdotter	Queen consort of Norway; 1028–1035	Succeeded by Elisiv of Kiev
