= Alfred Ætheling =

English prince (c.1012-1036)

Alfred Aetheling
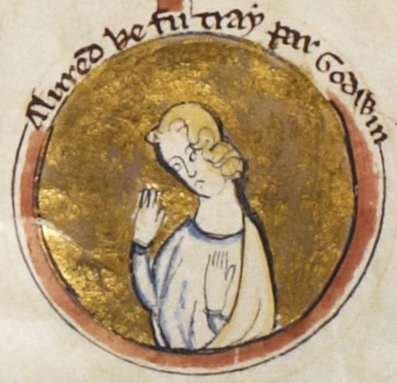
- Miniature of Alfred Aetheling in a 13th-century royal genealogy
- Born: c. 1012
- Died: 1036 (aged 23–24)
- House: House of Wessex
- Father: Æthelred the Unready
- Mother: Emma of Normandy

Ælfred Æþeling (c. 1012–1036) was the youngest of the eight sons of the English king Æthelred the Unready. He and his brother Edward the Confessor were sons of Æthelred's second wife Emma of Normandy. King Canute became their stepfather when he married Emma. Ælfred and his brother were caught up in the power struggles at the start and end of Canute's reign.

== Birth ==
King Æthelred the Unready married his second wife Emma of Normandy in 1002 and her elder son Edward the Confessor was born around 1004. Three charters between 1007 and 1011 are attested by Edward and his mother but not by Alfred, who first attests in 1013. This suggests that Alfred was probably several years younger than his brother.

== Siege of London ==
In 1013, during the siege of London by the Danes, Æthelred and his family took refuge in Normandy. Æthelred regained the throne in 1014 and died in 1016. England was conquered by Canute of Denmark later that year, and Alfred and Edward returned to the court of their uncle, Duke Richard II of Normandy. There is some evidence of a plan on the part of Duke Richard to invade England on his nephews' behalf.

== Return to England ==
In 1035, Canute died, and during the uncertainty that followed, the heirs of the former Anglo-Saxon rulers attempted to restore the House of Wessex to the throne of England. Alfred Ætheling landed on the coast of Sussex with a Norman mercenary body guard and attempted to make his way to London. However he was betrayed, captured by Earl Godwin of Wessex, and blinded; he died soon afterwards.

When Harthacnut succeeded his half-brother Harold, he prosecuted Earl Godwin and Lyfing, Bishop of Worcester and Crediton, for the crime against his half-brother; the Bishop lost his see for a while and Godwin gave the King a warship carrying eighty fighting men as appeasement and swore that he had not wanted the prince blinded and that whatever he had done was in obedience to King Harold. Tradition holds that like Harthacnut, Edward the Confessor considered Godwin guilty.

The House of Wessex was restored through the accession of Alfred's brother Edward in 1042. Alfred's death was one of the main reasons for the mistrust and resentment shown by many members of Anglo-Saxon society, and particularly from Edward himself, towards Earl Godwin and his sons.
