= Liðsmannaflokkr =

Skaldic poem

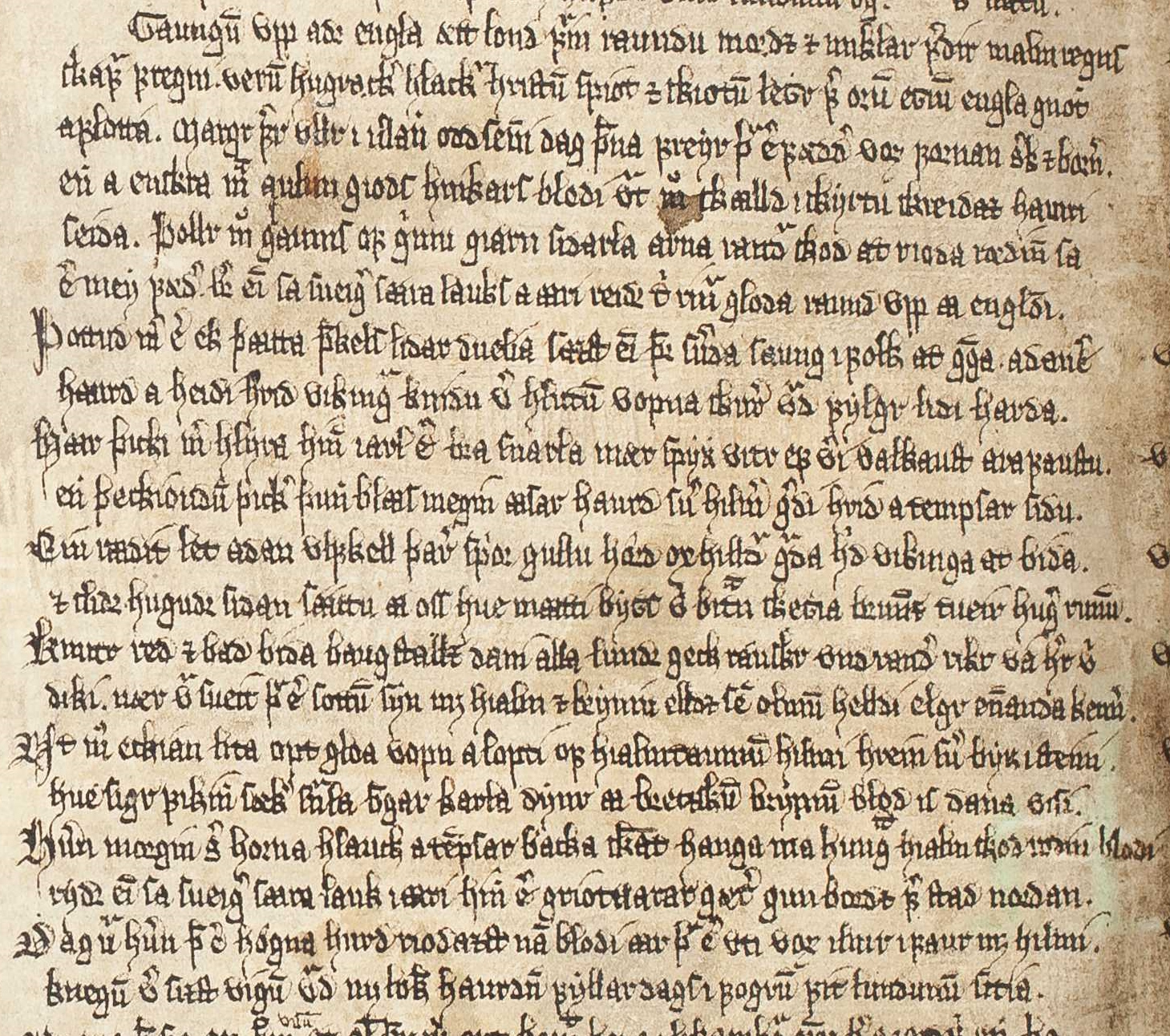
The version of Liðsmannaflokkr from the Flateyjarbók

Liðsmannaflokkr ("household troop's poem") is the title of a skaldic poem in ten stanzas describing the capture of London by Cnut the Great in 1016, preserved in Óláfs saga helga and Flateyjarbók (fol. 186v), and in a shorter version in Knýtlinga saga.

Óláfs saga attributes the poem to Olaf himself, while according to Knýtlinga saga, the poem was composed by members of Cnut's household troops during the London campaign. According to Poole (1991), the latter version is more credible.

Stanza 7 praises Cnut's actions in battle,

Knútr réð ok bað bíða,
baugstalls, Dani alla,
lundr gekk rǫskr und randir,
ríkr, vá herr við díki;
nær vas, sveit þars sóttum,
syn, með hjalm ok brynju,
elds, sem olmum heldi
elg Rennandi kennir.

"Cnut decided and commanded all the Danes to wait; the 'mighty tree of the ring support' (baugstalls lundr ríkr) went bravely under the shields; the army fought by the moat. Lady, where we sought out the enemy with helmet and mail-shirt, it was nearly as if the 'master of the fire of Rennandi' (elds Rennandi kennir) were holding a maddened elk."

== See also ==
- Battle of Assandun
- Knútsdrápa
