= Knútsdrápa =

Old Norse skaldic compositions

Knútsdrápur (plural of Knútsdrápa) are Old Norse skaldic compositions in the form of drápur which were recited for the praise of Canute the Great. There are a number of these:

- The Knútsdrápa by Óttarr svarti
- The Knútsdrapa by Sigvatr Þórðarson
- Eight poetic fragments thought to derive from a single Knútsdrapa by Hallvarðr háreksblesi
