= Cnut =

King of Denmark, Norway and England (c.995–1035)

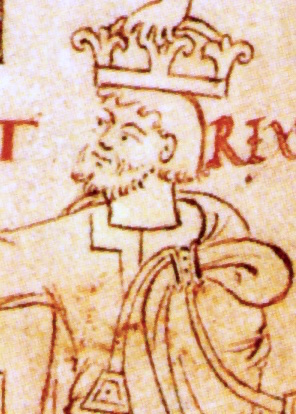
- Contemporary drawing of King Cnut from the New Minster Liber Vitae, 1031

King of England
- Reign: 1016–1035
- Coronation: 1017 in London
- Predecessor: Edmund II
- Successor: Harold I

King of Denmark
- Reign: 1018–1035
- Predecessor: Harald II
- Successor: Harthacnut

King of Norway
- Reign: 1028–1035
- Predecessor: Saint Olaf
- Successor: Magnus the Good
- Co-king: Svein Knutsson
- Born: c. 995; Kingdom of Denmark
- Died: 12 November 1035 (aged around 40); Shaftesbury, Dorset, England
- Burial: Old Minster, Winchester, England; Bones now in Winchester Cathedral, Winchester, England
- Spouses: Ælfgifu of Northampton; Emma of Normandy
- Issue: Svein Knutsson; Harold Harefoot; Harthacnut; Gunhilda, Queen of the Germans
- House: Knýtlinga
- Father: Swein Forkbeard

Cnut (/kəˈnjuːt/ kə-NYOOT; Old Norse: Knútr; (Note: Modern languages: Danish: Knud den Store or Knud II; Norwegian: Knut den mektige, Swedish: Knut den Store.) c. 995 – 12 November 1035), also known as Canute and with the epithet the Great, was King of England from 1016, King of Denmark from 1018, and King of Norway from 1028 until his death in 1035. The three kingdoms united under Cnut's rule are referred to together as the North Sea Empire by historians.

As a Danish prince, Cnut won the throne of England in 1016 in the wake of centuries of Viking activity in northwestern Europe. His later accession to the Danish throne in 1018 brought the crowns of England and Denmark together. Cnut sought to keep this power base by uniting Danes and English under cultural bonds of wealth and custom. After a decade of conflict with opponents in Scandinavia, Cnut claimed the crown of Norway in Trondheim in 1028. In 1031, Malcolm II of Scotland also submitted to him, though Anglo-Norse influence over Scotland was weak and ultimately did not last to the time of Cnut's death.

Dominion of England lent the Danes an important link to the maritime zone between the islands of Great Britain and Ireland, where Cnut, like his father before him, had a strong interest and wielded much influence among the Norse–Gaels. Cnut's possession of England's dioceses and the continental Diocese of Denmark – with a claim laid upon it by the Holy Roman Empire's Archdiocese of Hamburg-Bremen – was a source of great prestige and leverage among the magnates of Christendom (gaining notable concessions such as one on the price of the pallium of his bishops, though they still had to travel to obtain the pallium, as well as on the tolls his people had to pay on the way to Rome). After his 1026 victory against Norway and Sweden, and on his way back from Rome where he attended the coronation of the Holy Roman Emperor, Cnut deemed himself "King of all England and Denmark and the Norwegians and of some of the Swedes" in a letter written for the benefit of his subjects. Medieval historian Norman Cantor called him "the most effective king in Anglo-Saxon history".

He is popularly invoked in the context of the legend of King Canute and the tide.

== Birth and kingship ==
Cnut was the son (after Harald) of Swein Forkbeard, and thus came from a line of Scandinavian rulers central to the unification of Denmark. Neither the place nor the date of his birth are known. Harthacnut I was the semi-legendary founder of the Danish royal house at the beginning of the 10th century, and his son, Gorm the Old, became the first in the official line (the "Old" in his name indicates this). Harald Bluetooth, Gorm's son and Cnut's grandfather, was the Danish king at the time of the Christianization of Denmark; he became one of the first Scandinavian kings to accept Christianity.

The identity of Cnut the Great's mother is uncertain and subject to significant contradictions between sources. Norse sagas of the High Middle Ages, most prominently Snorri Sturluson's Heimskringla, name her Gunhild, a daughter of Burislav, king of the Wends (referring to West Slavic Obotrite or Wendish territories in the southern Baltic). According to these accounts, she bore Cnut and later died, after which Sweyn Forkbeard married Sigrid the Haughty, the widow of Eric the Victorious. Contemporary and near-contemporary Continental sources add further complications. The Encomium Emmae Reginae refers to Cnut's mother as a daughter of Mieszko I of Poland (sometimes reconstructed as Świętosława in fringe revisionist scholarship). Thietmar of Merseburg's Chronicon also mentions an unnamed daughter of Mieszko I, the sister of Boleslaus, ruler of Poland and the widow of Erik, king of the Swedes (Svear), who died between 992 and 995, married Sweyn and became mother to his sons, but provides no name or dramatic details. Adam of Bremen in his Gesta Hammaburgensis ecclesiae pontificum uniquely equates Cnut's mother with the former Queen of Sweden (wife of Eric the Victorious and mother of Olof Skötkonung), though this identification is widely regarded by modern historians as an error or conflation. Due to these inconsistencies, including differing timelines, names, and sequences of marriages—mainstream scholarship tends to view the figure as semi-legendary or a composite of diplomatic alliances common in the Baltic region during the late Viking Age. The "Polish princess" link remains a hypothesis rather than an established fact, while the Wendish/Obotrite connection in the sagas points to broader Wendish noble networks rather than a singular Piast origin.

Different theories regarding the number and identity of Sweyn's wives have been proposed. Many historians assume he had at least two wives: an earlier Wendish consort who was Cnut's mother, and a later one identified with Sigrid the Haughty. Cnut's brother Harald is described as the younger in the Encomium Emmae.

Some hint of Cnut's childhood can be found in the Flateyjarbók, a 13th-century Icelandic source that says he was taught his soldiery by the chieftain Thorkell the Tall, brother to Sigvaldi, Jarl of Jomsborg, and the legendary Jomsvikings, at their stronghold on the island of Wollin, off the coast of Pomerania. His date of birth, like his mother's name, is unknown. Contemporary works such as the Chronicon and the Encomium Emmae, do not mention this. Even so, in a Knútsdrápa by the skald Óttarr svarti, there is a statement that Cnut was "of no great age" when he first went to war. It also mentions a battle identifiable with Swein Forkbeard's invasion of England and attack on the city of Norwich, in 1003–04, after the St. Brice's Day massacre of Danes by the English, in 1002. If Cnut indeed accompanied this expedition, his birthdate may be near 990, or even 980. If not, and if the skald's poetic verse references another assault, such as Swein's conquest of England in 1013–14, it may even suggest a birth date nearer 1000. There is a passage of the Encomiast (as the author of the Encomium Emmae is known) with a reference to the force Cnut led in his English conquest of 1015–16. Here (see below) it says all the Vikings were of "mature age" under Cnut "the king".

A description of Cnut appears in the 13th-century Icelandic Knýtlinga saga:

Knut was exceptionally tall and strong, and the handsomest of men, all except for his nose, that was thin, high-set, and rather hooked. He had a fair complexion and a fine, thick head of hair. His eyes were better than those of other men, being both more handsome and keener-sighted.

— Knytlinga Saga

Hardly anything is known with certainty of Cnut's life until the year he was part of a Scandinavian force under his father, King Swein, in his invasion of England in summer 1013. Cnut was likely part of his father's 1003 and 1004 campaigns in England, although the evidence is not firm. The 1013 invasion was the climax to a succession of Viking raids spread over a number of decades. Following their landing in the Humber, the kingdom fell to the Vikings quickly, and near the end of the year King Æthelred fled to Normandy, leaving Swein Forkbeard in possession of England. In the winter, Swein was in the process of consolidating his kingship, with Cnut left in charge of the fleet and the base of the army at Gainsborough in Lincolnshire.

On the death of Swein Forkbeard after a few months as king, on Candlemas (Sunday 3 February 1014), Harald succeeded him as King of Denmark, while the Vikings and the people of the Danelaw immediately elected Cnut as king in England. However, the English nobility took a different view, and the Witenagemot recalled Æthelred from Normandy. The restored king swiftly led an army against Cnut, who fled with his army to Denmark, along the way mutilating the hostages they had taken and abandoning them on the beach at Sandwich in Kent. Cnut went to Harald and supposedly made the suggestion they might have a joint kingship, although this found no favour with his brother. Harald is thought to have offered Cnut command of his forces for another invasion of England, on the condition he did not continue to press his claim. In any case, Cnut succeeded in assembling a large fleet with which to launch another invasion.

== Conquest of England ==
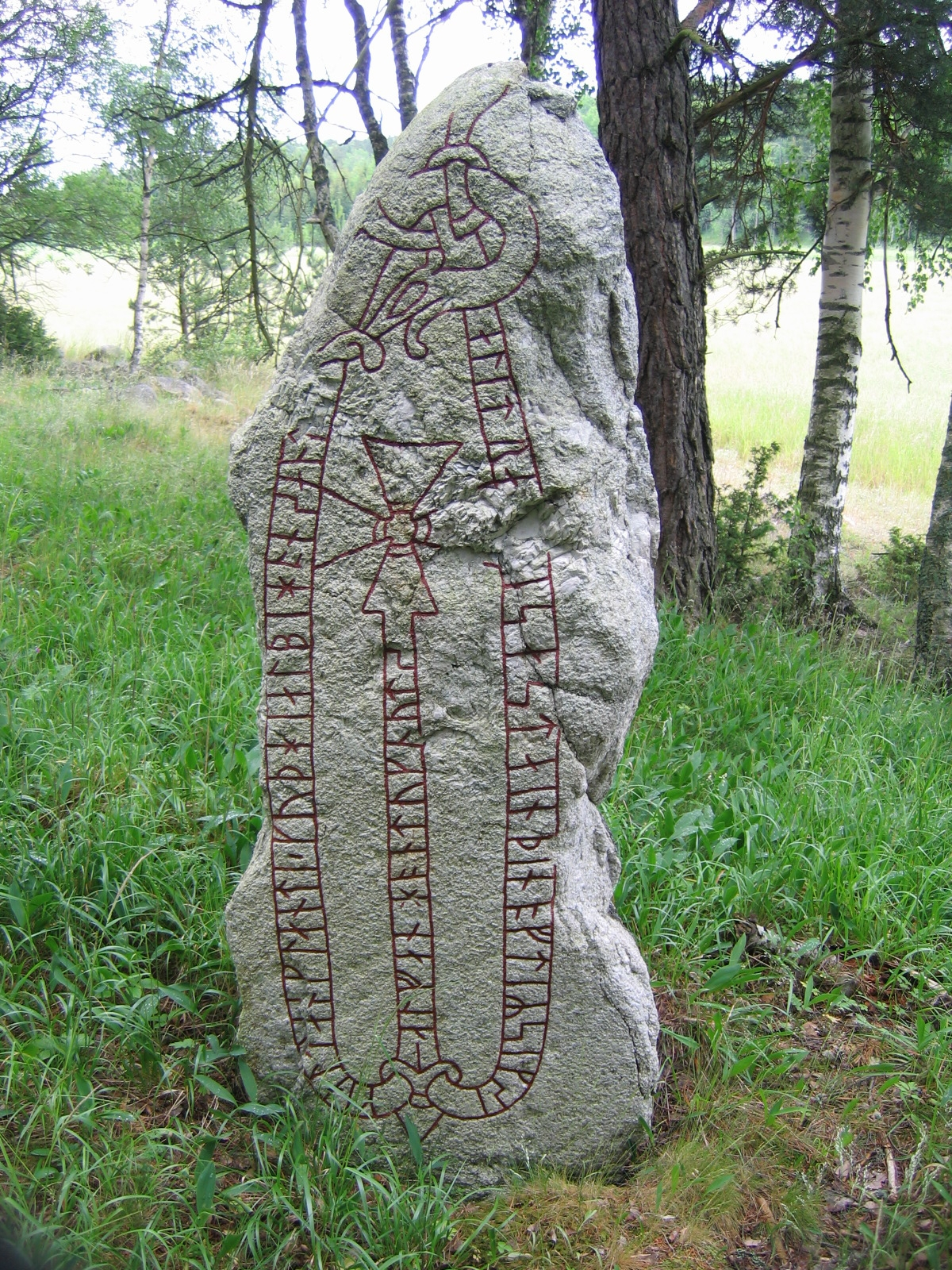
This runestone in Sweden (U 194), in memory of a Viking known as Alli, says he won Knútr's payment in England.

Among the allies of Denmark was Bolesław I the Brave, the duke of Poland (later crowned king) and a relative to the Danish royal house. He lent some Polish troops, likely to have been a pledge made to Cnut and his brother Harald when, in the winter, they "went amongst the Wends" to fetch their mother back to the Danish court. She had been sent away by their father after the death of the Swedish king Eric the Victorious in 995, and his marriage to Sigrid the Haughty, the Swedish queen mother. This wedlock formed a strong alliance between the successor to the throne of Sweden, Olof Skötkonung, and the rulers of Denmark, his in-laws. Swedes were certainly among the allies in the English conquest. Another in-law to the Danish royal house, Eiríkr Hákonarson, was the earl of Lade and the co-ruler of Norway with his brother Sweyn Haakonsson – Norway having been under Danish sovereignty since the Battle of Svolder, in 999. Eiríkr's participation in the invasion left his son Hakon to rule Norway, with Sweyn.

In the summer of 1015, Cnut's fleet set sail for England with a Danish army of perhaps 10,000 in 200 longships. Cnut was at the head of an array of Vikings from all over Scandinavia. The invading army was composed primarily of mercenaries. The invasion force was to engage in often close and grisly warfare with the English for the next fourteen months. Practically all of the battles were fought against the eldest son of Æthelred, Edmund Ironside.

=== Landing in Wessex ===
According to the Peterborough Chronicle manuscript, one of the major witnesses of the Anglo-Saxon Chronicle, early in September 1015 "[Cnut] came into Sandwich, and straightway sailed around Kent to Wessex, until he came to the mouth of the Frome, and harried in Dorset and Wiltshire and Somerset", beginning a campaign of an intensity not seen since the days of Alfred the Great. A passage from Queen Emma's Encomium provides a picture of Cnut's fleet:

[T]here were there so many kinds of shields, that you could have believed that troops of all nations were present. ... Gold shone on the prows, silver also flashed on the variously shaped ships. ... For who could look upon the lions of the foe, terrible with the brightness of gold, who upon the men of metal, menacing with golden face, ... who upon the bulls on the ships threatening death, their horns shining with gold, without feeling any fear for the king of such a force? Furthermore, in this great expedition, there was present no slave, no man freed from slavery, no low-born man, no man weakened by age; for all were noble, all strong with the might of mature age, all sufficiently fit for any type of fighting, all of such great fleetness, that they scorned the speed of horsemen.

— Encomium Emmae Reginae

Wessex, long ruled by the dynasty of Alfred and Æthelred, submitted to Cnut late in 1015, as it had to his father two years earlier. At this point Eadric Streona, the Ealdorman of Mercia, deserted Æthelred together with 40 ships and their crews and joined forces with Cnut. Another defector was Thorkell the Tall, a Jomsviking chief who had fought against the Viking invasion of Swein Forkbeard, with a pledge of allegiance to the English in 1012 – some explanation for this shift of allegiance may be found in a stanza of the Jómsvíkinga saga that mentions two attacks against Jomsborg's mercenaries while they were in England, with a man known as Henninge, a brother of Thorkell, among their casualties. If the Flateyjarbók is correct that this man was Cnut's childhood mentor, it explains his acceptance of his allegiance – with Jomvikings ultimately in the service of Jomsborg. The 40 ships Eadric came with, often thought to be of the Danelaw, were probably Thorkell's.

=== Advance into the North ===
Early in 1016, the Vikings crossed the Thames and harried Warwickshire, while Edmund Ironside's attempts at opposition seem to have come to nothing – the chronicler says the English army disbanded because the king and the citizenry of London were not present. The mid-winter assault by Cnut devastated its way northwards across eastern Mercia. Another summons of the army brought the Englishmen together, and they were met this time by the king, although "it came to nothing as so often before", and Æthelred returned to London with fears of betrayal. Edmund then went north to join Uhtred the Earl of Northumbria and together they harried Staffordshire, Shropshire and Cheshire in western Mercia, possibly targeting the estates of Eadric Streona. Cnut's occupation of Northumbria meant Uhtred returned home to submit himself to Cnut, who seems to have sent a Northumbrian rival, Thurbrand the Hold, to massacre Uhtred and his retinue. Eiríkr Hákonarson, most likely with another force of Scandinavians, came to support Cnut at this point, and the veteran Norwegian jarl was put in charge of Northumbria.

Prince Edmund remained in London, still unsubdued behind its walls, and was elected king after the death of Æthelred on 23 April 1016.

=== Siege of London ===
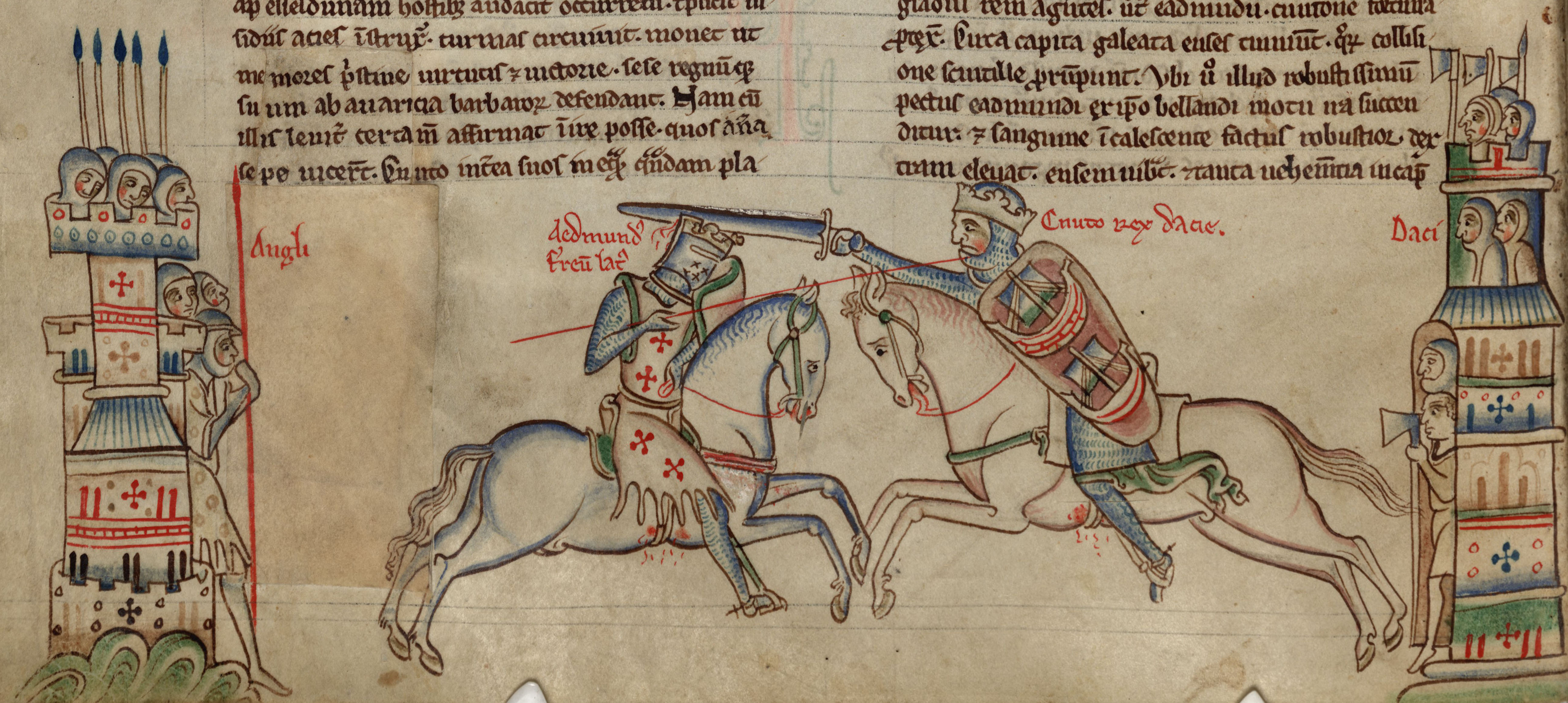
Medieval illumination depicting Kings Edmund Ironside (left) and Cnut (right), from the Chronica Majora written and illustrated by Matthew Paris

Cnut returned southward, and the Danish army evidently divided, some dealing with Edmund, who had broken out of London before Cnut's encirclement of the city was complete, and had gone to gather an army in Wessex, the traditional heartland of the English monarchy. Part of the Danish army besieged London, constructing dikes on the northern and southern flanks and a channel dug across the banks of the Thames to the south of the city, enabling their longships to cut off communications up-river.

There was a battle fought at Penselwood in Somerset – with a hill in Selwood Forest as the likely location – and a subsequent battle at Sherston, in Wiltshire, which was fought over two days but left neither side victorious.

Edmund was able to temporarily relieve London, driving the enemy away and defeating them after crossing the Thames at Brentford. Suffering heavy losses, he withdrew to Wessex to gather fresh troops, and the Danes again brought London under siege, but after another unsuccessful assault they withdrew into Kent under attack by the English, with a battle fought at Otford. At this point Eadric Streona went over to King Edmund, and Cnut set sail northwards across the Thames estuary to Essex, and went from the landing of the ships up the River Orwell to ravage Mercia.

=== London captured by treaty ===
On 18 October 1016, the Danes were engaged by Edmund's army as they retired towards their ships, leading to the Battle of Assandun, fought at either Ashingdon, in south-east, or Ashdon, in north-west Essex. In the ensuing struggle, Eadric Streona, whose return to the English side had perhaps only been a ruse, withdrew his forces from the fray, bringing about a decisive English defeat. Edmund fled westwards, and Cnut pursued him into Gloucestershire, with another battle probably fought near the Forest of Dean, for Edmund had an alliance with some of the Welsh.

On an island near Deerhurst, Cnut and Edmund, who had been wounded, met to negotiate terms of peace. It was agreed that all of England north of the Thames was to be the domain of the Danish prince, while all to the south was kept by the English king, along with London. Accession to the reign of the entire realm was set to pass to Cnut upon Edmund's death. Edmund died on 30 November, within weeks of the arrangement. Some sources claim Edmund was murdered, although the circumstances of his death are unknown. The West Saxons now accepted Cnut as king of all of England, and he was crowned by Lyfing, Archbishop of Canterbury, in London in 1017.

== King of England ==
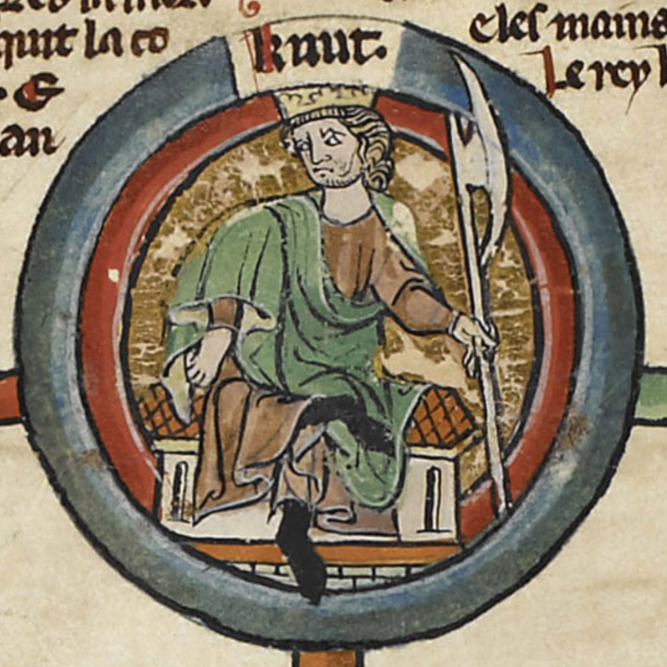
Cnut in the late thirteenth century Genealogical Chronicle of the English Kings

Cnut ruled England for nearly two decades. The protection he lent against Viking raiders – many of them under his command – restored the prosperity that had been increasingly impaired since the resumption of Viking attacks in the 980s. In turn, the English helped him to establish control over the majority of Scandinavia, too. Under his rule, England did not experience serious external attacks.

=== Consolidation and Danegeld ===
As Danish King of England, Cnut was quick to eliminate any prospective challenge from the survivors of the mighty Wessex dynasty. The first year of his reign was marked by the executions of a number of English noblemen whom he considered suspect. Æthelred's son Eadwig Ætheling fled from England but was killed on Cnut's orders. Edmund Ironside's sons likewise fled abroad. Æthelred's sons by Emma of Normandy went under the protection of their relatives in the Duchy of Normandy.

In July 1017, Cnut wed Queen Emma, the widow of Æthelred and daughter of Richard I, Duke of Normandy. In 1018, having collected a Danegeld amounting to the colossal sum of £72,000 levied nationwide, with an additional £10,500 extracted from London, Cnut paid off his army and sent most of them home. He retained 40 ships and their crews as a standing force in England. An annual tax called heregeld (army payment) was collected through the same system Æthelred had instituted in 1012 to reward Scandinavians in his service.

Cnut built on the existing English trend for multiple shires to be grouped together under a single ealdorman, thus dividing the country into four large administrative units whose geographical extent was based on the largest and most durable of the separate kingdoms that had preceded the unification of England. The officials responsible for these provinces were designated earls, a title of Scandinavian origin already in localised use in England, which now everywhere replaced that of ealdorman. Wessex was initially kept under Cnut's personal control, while Northumbria went to Erik of Hlathir, East Anglia to Thorkell the Tall, and Mercia remained in the hands of Eadric Streona.

This initial distribution of power was short-lived. The chronically treacherous Eadric was executed within a year of Cnut's accession. Mercia passed to one of the leading families of the region, probably first to Leofwine, ealdorman of the Hwicce under Æthelred, but certainly soon to his son Leofric. In 1021, Thorkell also fell from favour and was outlawed.

Following his death in the 1020s, Erik of Hlathir was succeeded as Earl of Northumbria by Siward, whose grandmother, Estrid (married to Úlfr Thorgilsson), was Cnut's sister. Bernicia, the northern part of Northumbria, was theoretically part of Erik and Siward's earldom, but throughout Cnut's reign it effectively remained under the control of the English dynasty based at Bamburgh, which had dominated the area at least since the early 10th century. They served as junior Earls of Bernicia under the titular authority of the Earl of Northumbria. By the 1030s Cnut's direct administration of Wessex had come to an end, with the establishment of an earldom under Godwin, an Englishman from a powerful Sussex family. In general, after initial reliance on his Scandinavian followers in the first years of his reign, Cnut allowed those Anglo-Saxon families of the existing English nobility who had earned his trust to assume rulership of his Earldoms.

=== Affairs to the East ===
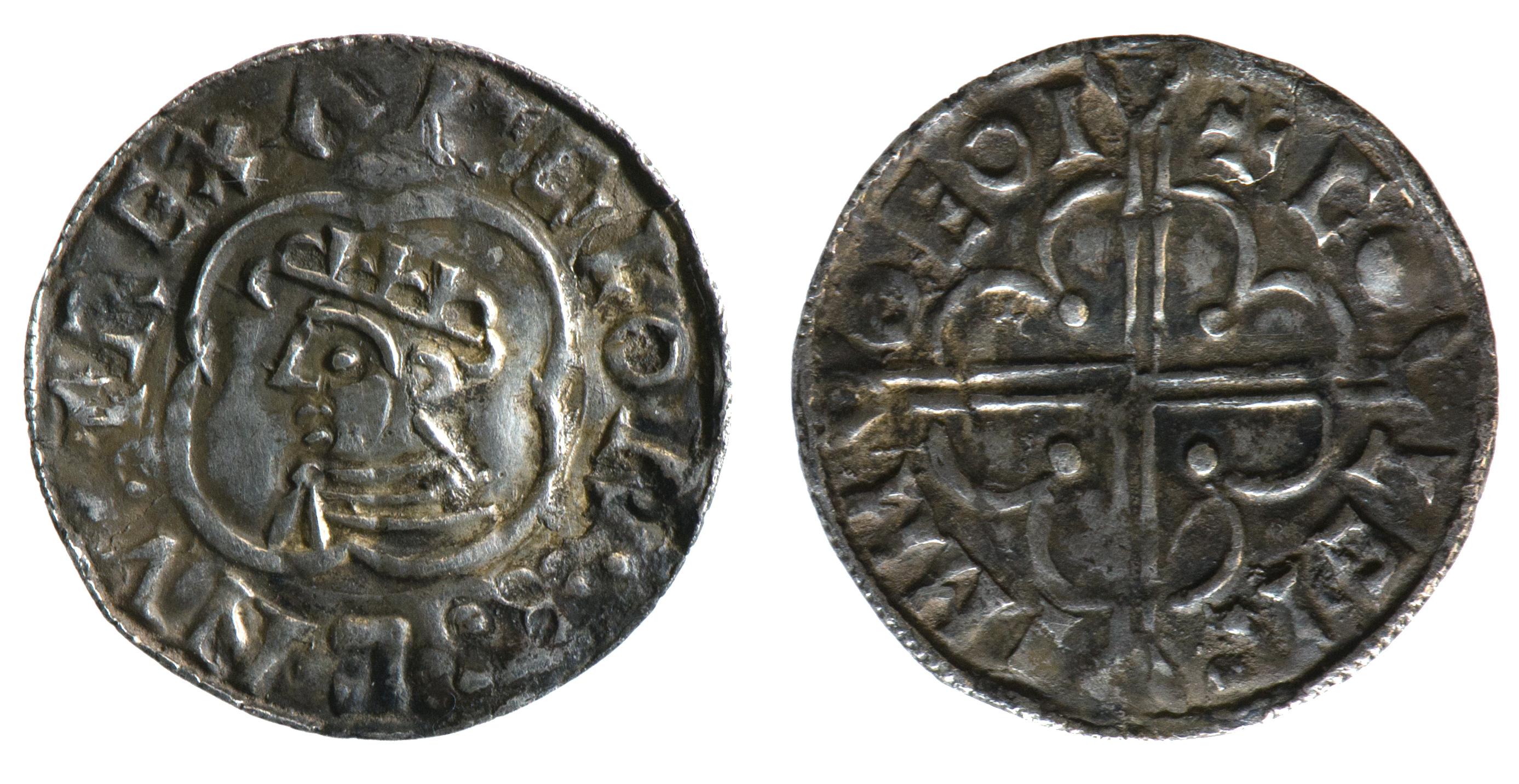
Silver penny of Cnut the Great with a quatrefoil on the obverse dating to the period c.1017–23

At the Battle of Nesjar, in 1016, Olaf Haraldsson won the kingdom of Norway from the Danes. It was at some time after Erik left for England, and on the death of Svein while retreating to Sweden, maybe intent on returning to Norway with reinforcements, that Erik's son Hakon went to join his father and support Cnut in England, too.

Cnut's brother Harald may have been at Cnut's coronation, in 1016, returning to Denmark as its king, with part of the fleet, at some point thereafter. It is only certain, though, that there was an entry of his name, alongside Cnut's, in confraternity with Christ Church, Canterbury, in 1018. This is not conclusive, though, for the entry may have been made in Harald's absence, perhaps by the hand of Cnut himself, which means that, while it is usually thought that Harald died in 1018, it is unsure whether he was still alive at this point. Entry of his brother's name in the Canterbury codex may have been Cnut's attempt to make his vengeance for Harald's murder good with the Church. This may have been just a gesture for a soul to be under the protection of God. There is evidence Cnut was in battle with "pirates" in 1018, with his destruction of the crews of thirty ships, although it is unknown if this was off the English or Danish shores. He himself mentions troubles in his 1019 letter (to England, from Denmark), written as the King of England and Denmark. These events can be seen, with plausibility, to be in connection with the death of Harald. Cnut says he dealt with dissenters to ensure Denmark was free to assist England:

King Cnut greets in friendship his archbishop and his diocesan bishops and Earl Thurkil and all his earls ... ecclesiastic and lay, in England ... I inform you that I will be a gracious lord and a faithfull observer of God's rights and just secular law. (He exhorts his ealdormen to assist the bishops in the maintenance of) God's rights ... and the benefit of the people.

If anyone, ecclesiastic or layman, Dane or Englishman, is so presumptuous as to defy God's law and my royal authority or the secular laws, and he will not make amends and desist according to the direction of my bishops, I then pray, and also command, Earl Thurkil, if he can, to cause the evil-doer to do right. And if he cannot, then it is my will that with the power of us both he shall destroy him in the land or drive him out of the land, whether he be of high or low rank. And it is my will that all the nation, ecclesiastical and lay, shall steadfastly observe Edgar's laws, which all men have chosen and sworn at Oxford.

Since I did not spare my money, as long as hostility was threatening you, I with God's help have put an end to it. Then I was informed that greater danger was approaching us than we liked at all; and then I went myself with the men who accompanied me to Denmark, from where the greatest injury had come to us, and with God's help I have made it so that never henceforth shall hostility reach you from there as long as you support me rightly and my life lasts. Now I thank Almighty God for his help and his mercy, that I have settled the great dangers which were approaching us that we need fear no danger to us from there; but we may reckon on full help and deliverance if we need it.

— Cnut's letter of 1019, Trow 2005, pp. 168–169

=== Statesmanship ===
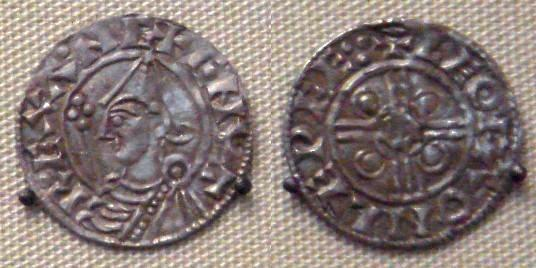
Silver penny of Cnut the Great dating to the period c.1024–30

Cnut was generally remembered as a wise and successful king of England, although this view may in part be attributable to his good treatment of the Church, keeper of the historic record. Accordingly, he is considered, even today, as a religious man despite the fact that he was in an arguably sinful relationship, with two wives, and the harsh treatment he dealt his fellow Christian opponents.

Under his reign, Cnut brought together the English and Danish kingdoms, and the Scandinavic and Saxon peoples saw a period of dominance across Scandinavia, as well as within the British Isles. His campaigns abroad meant the tables of Viking supremacy were stacked in favour of the English, turning the prows of the longships towards Scandinavia. He reinstated the Laws of King Edgar to allow for the constitution of a Danelaw, and for the activity of Scandinavians at large.

Cnut reinstituted the extant laws with a series of proclamations to assuage common grievances brought to his attention, including: On Inheritance in case of Intestacy, and On Heriots and Reliefs. He also strengthened the currency, initiating a series of coins of equal weight to those being used in Denmark and other parts of Scandinavia. He issued the law codes of Cnut known now as I Cnut and II Cnut, though these seem primarily to have been produced by Wulfstan II of York.

In his royal court, there were both Englishmen and Scandinavians.

== King of Denmark ==
Harald II died in 1018, and Cnut went to Denmark to affirm his succession to the Danish crown, stating his intention to avert attacks against England in a letter in 1019 (see above). It seems there were Danes in opposition to him, and an attack he carried out on the Wends of Pomerania may have had something to do with this. In this expedition, at least one of Cnut's Englishmen, Godwin, apparently won the king's trust after a night-time raid he personally led against a Wendish encampment.

His hold on the Danish throne presumably stable, Cnut was back in England in 1020. He appointed Ulf Jarl, the husband of his sister Estrid Svendsdatter, as regent of Denmark, further entrusting him with his young son by Queen Emma, Harthacnut, whom he had designated the heir of his kingdom. The banishment of Thorkell the Tall in 1021 may be seen in relation to the attack on the Wends. With the death of Olof Skötkonung in 1022, and the succession to the Swedish throne of his son Anund Jacob bringing Sweden into alliance with Norway, there was cause for a demonstration of Danish strength in the Baltic. Jomsborg, the legendary stronghold of the Jomsvikings (thought to be on an island off the coast of Pomerania), was probably the target of Cnut's expedition. Successful, after this clear display of Cnut's intentions to dominate Scandinavian affairs, it seems that Thorkell reconciled with Cnut in 1023.

When the Norwegian king Olaf Haraldsson and Anund Jakob took advantage of Cnut's commitment to England and began to launch attacks against Denmark, Ulf gave the Danish freemen cause to accept Harthacnut, still a child, as king. This ruse resulted in Ulf ruling the kingdom as regent. Upon news of these events, Cnut set sail for Denmark to restore himself and to deal with Ulf, who then got back in line. In a battle known as the Battle of the Helgeå, Cnut and his men fought the Norwegians and Swedes at the mouth of the river Helgeå, probably in 1026, and the apparent victory left Cnut as the dominant leader in Scandinavia. Ulf the usurper's realignment and participation in the battle did not, in the end, earn him Cnut's forgiveness. Some sources state that the brothers-in-law were playing chess at a banquet in Roskilde when an argument arose between them, and the next day, Christmas 1026, one of Cnut's housecarls killed the jarl with his blessing, in Trinity Church, the predecessor to Roskilde Cathedral.

=== Journey to Rome ===
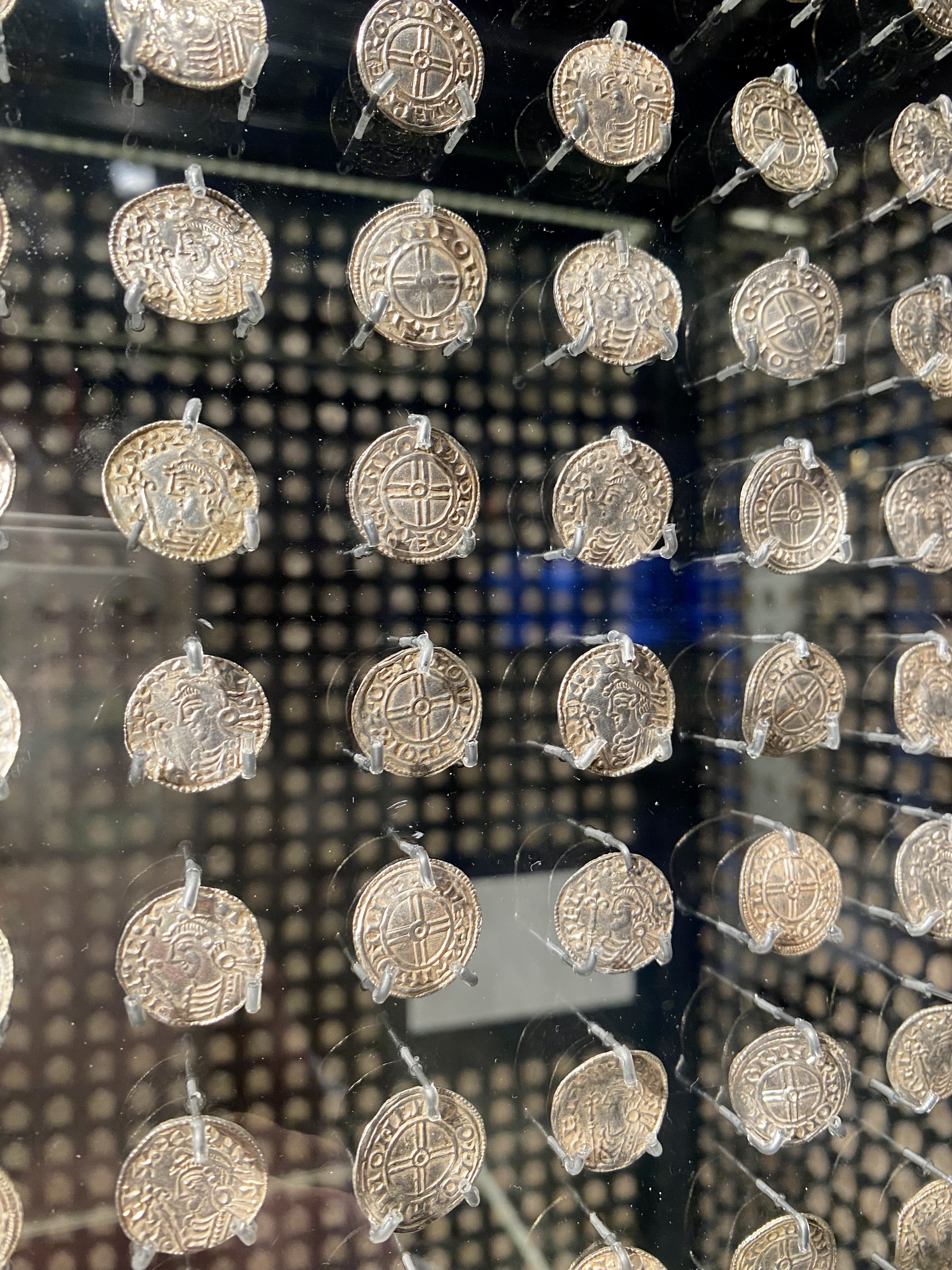
Coins of Cnut the Great, in Buckinghamshire County Museum, Aylesbury

His enemies in Scandinavia subdued, and apparently at his leisure, Cnut was able to accept an invitation to witness the accession in Rome of the Holy Roman Emperor Conrad II. He left his affairs in the north and went from Denmark to the coronation at Easter 1027, which would have been of considerable prestige for rulers of Europe in the Middle Ages. On the return journey he wrote his letter of 1027, like his letter of 1019, informing his subjects in England of his intentions from abroad and proclaiming himself "king of all England and Denmark and the Norwegians and of some of the Swedes".

Consistent with his role as a Christian king, Cnut says he went to Rome to repent for his sins, to pray for redemption and the security of his subjects, and to negotiate with the Pope for a reduction in the costs of the pallium for English archbishops, and for a resolution to the competition between the archdioceses of Canterbury and Hamburg-Bremen for superiority over the Danish dioceses. He also sought to improve the conditions for pilgrims, as well as merchants, on the road to Rome. In his own words:

... I spoke with the Emperor himself and the Lord Pope and the princes there about the needs of all people of my entire realm, both English and Danes, that a juster law and securer peace might be granted to them on the road to Rome and that they should not be straitened by so many barriers along the road, and harassed by unjust tolls; and the Emperor agreed and likewise King Robert who governs most of these same toll gates. And all the magnates confirmed by edict that my people, both merchants, and the others who travel to make their devotions, might go to Rome and return without being afflicted by barriers and toll collectors, in firm peace and secure in a just law.

— Cnut's letter of 1027, Trow 2005, p. 193

"Robert" in Cnut's text is probably a clerical error for Rudolph, the last ruler of an independent Kingdom of Burgundy. Hence, the solemn word of the Pope, the Emperor and Rudolph was given with the witness of four archbishops, twenty bishops, and "innumerable multitudes of dukes and nobles", suggesting it was before the ceremonies were completed. Cnut without doubt threw himself into his role with zest. His image as a just Christian king, statesman and diplomat and crusader against unjustness, seems rooted in reality, as well as one he sought to project.

A good illustration of his status within Europe is the fact that Cnut and the King of Burgundy went alongside the emperor in the imperial procession and stood shoulder-to-shoulder with him on the same pedestal. Cnut and the emperor, in accord with various sources, took to one another's company like brothers, for they were of a similar age. Conrad gave Cnut lands in the Mark of Schleswig – the land-bridge between the Scandinavian kingdoms and the continent – as a token of their treaty of friendship. Centuries of conflict in this area between the Danes and the Germans had led to the construction of the Danevirke, from Schleswig, on the Schlei, an inlet of the Baltic Sea, to the North Sea.

Cnut's visit to Rome was a triumph. In the verse of Knútsdrápa, Sigvatr Þórðarson praises Cnut, his king, as being "dear to the Emperor, close to Peter". In the days of Christendom, a king seen to be in favour with God could expect to be ruler over a happy kingdom. He was surely in a stronger position, not only with the Church and the people, but also in the alliance with his southern rivals he was able to conclude his conflicts with his rivals in the north. His letter not only tells his countrymen of his achievements in Rome, but also of his ambitions within the Scandinavian world at his arrival home:

... I, as I wish to be made known to you, returning by the same route that I took out, am going to Denmark to arrange peace and a firm treaty, in the counsel of all the Danes, with those races and people who would have deprived us of life and rule if they could, but they could not, God destroying their strength. May he preserve us by his bounteous compassion in rule and honour and henceforth scatter and bring to nothing the power and might of all our enemies! And finally, when peace has been arranged with our surrounding peoples and all our kingdom here in the east has been properly ordered and pacified, so that we have no war to fear on any side or the hostility of individuals, I intend to come to England as early this summer as I can to attend to the equipping of a fleet.

— Cnut's letter of 1027

Cnut was to return to Denmark from Rome, arrange for its security, and afterward sail to England.

== King of Norway and part of Sweden ==
The North Sea Empire of Cnut the Great, c. 1030. (Note that the Norwegian (now Swedish) lands of Jemtland, Herjedalen, Idre and Særna are not included in this map.)

In his 1027 letter, Cnut refers to himself as king of "the Norwegians, and of some of the Swedes" – his victory over Swedes suggests Helgeå to be the river in Uppland and not the one in eastern Scania – while the king of Sweden appears to have been made a renegade. It has been speculated that the Swedish city Sigtuna was held by Cnut; there were coins struck there that called him king, but there is no narrative record of his occupation. These coins are however usually regarded as copies of coins minted in Denmark. Coins stating that the Swedish king Olof Skötkonung was King of England have also been found in Sigtuna. Cnut also stated his intention of proceeding to Denmark to secure peace between the kingdoms of Scandinavia, which fits the account of John of Worcester that in 1027 Cnut heard some Norwegians were discontented and sent them sums of gold and silver to gain their support for his claim to the throne.

In 1028, Cnut set off from England to Norway, and the city of Trondheim, with a fleet of fifty ships. King Olaf Haraldsson was unable to put up a serious fight, both as his nobles had been bribed by Cnut and (according to Adam of Bremen) because he tended to apprehend their wives for sorcery. Cnut was crowned king, now of England, Denmark and Norway as well as part of Sweden. He entrusted the Earldom of Lade to the former line of earls, in Håkon Eiriksson, with Eiríkr Hákonarson probably dead by this time. Hakon was possibly the Earl of Northumbria after Erik as well.

Hakon, a member of a family with a long tradition of hostility towards the independent Norwegian kings, and a relative of Cnut's, was already in lordship over the Isles with the earldom of Worcester, possibly from 1016 to 1017. The sea-lanes through the Irish Sea and the Hebrides led to Orkney and Norway, and were central to Cnut's ambitions for dominance of Scandinavia and the British Isles. Hakon was meant to be Cnut's lieutenant in this strategic chain, and the final component was his installation as the king's deputy in Norway, after the expulsion of Olaf Haraldsson in 1028. He was drowned in a shipwreck in the Pentland Firth (between the Orkney Islands and the mainland coast) either late 1029 or early 1030.

Upon the death of Hakon, Olaf Haraldsson returned to Norway, with Swedes in his army. He died at the hands of his own people, at the Battle of Stiklestad in 1030. Cnut's subsequent attempt to rule Norway without the key support of the Trondejarls, through Ælfgifu of Northampton, and his eldest son by her, Sweyn Knutsson, was not a success. The period is known as Aelfgifu's Time in Norway, with heavy taxation, a rebellion, and the restoration of the former Norwegian dynasty under Saint Olaf's illegitimate son Magnus the Good.

== Influence in the western sea-ways ==
In 1014, while Cnut was preparing his re-invasion of England, the Battle of Clontarf pitted an array of armies laid out on the fields before the walls of Dublin. Máel Mórda mac Murchada, king of Leinster, and Sigtrygg Silkbeard, ruler of the Norse-Gaelic kingdom of Dublin, had sent out emissaries to all the Viking kingdoms to request assistance in their rebellion against Brian Bóruma, the High King of Ireland. Sigurd the Stout, the Earl of Orkney, was offered command of all the Norse forces, while the High King had sought assistance from the Albannaich, who were led by Domnall mac Eimín meic Cainnig, the Mormaer of Mar. The Leinster-Norse alliance was defeated, and both commanders, Sigurd and Máel Mórda, were killed. Brian, his son, his grandson, and the Mormaer Domhnall were slain as well. Sigtrygg's alliance was broken, although he was left alive, and the high-kingship of Ireland went back to the Uí Néill, again under Máel Sechnaill mac Domnaill.

There was a brief period of freedom in the Irish Sea zone for the Vikings of Dublin, with a political vacuum felt throughout the entire Western Maritime Zone of the North Atlantic Archipelago. Prominent among those who stood to fill the void was Cnut, "whose leadership of the Scandinavian world gave him a unique influence over the western colonies and whose control of their commercial arteries gave an economic edge to political domination". Coinage struck by the king in Dublin, Silkbeard, bearing Cnut's quatrefoil type – in issue c. 1017 – c. 1025 – sporadically replacing the legend with one bearing his own name and styling him as ruler either "of Dublin" or "among the Irish" provides evidence of Cnut's influence. Further evidence is the entry of one Sihtric dux in three of Cnut's charters.

In one of his verses, Cnut's court poet Sigvatr Þórðarson recounts that famous princes brought their heads to Cnut and bought peace. This verse mentions Olaf Haraldsson in the past tense, his death at the Battle of Stiklestad having occurred in 1030. It was therefore at some point after this and the consolidation of Norway that Cnut went to Scotland with an army, and the navy in the Irish Sea, in 1031, to receive, without bloodshed, the submission of three Scottish kings: Maelcolm, the future King Maelbeth and Iehmarc. One of these kings, Iehmarc, may be one Echmarcach mac Ragnaill, an Uí Ímair chieftain and the ruler of a sea-kingdom of the Irish Sea, with Galloway among his domains. Nevertheless, it appears that Malcolm adhered to little of Cnut's power, and that influence over Scotland died out by the time of Cnut's death.

Further, a Lausavísa attributable to the skald Óttarr svarti greets the ruler of the Danes, Irish, English and Island-dwellers – use of Irish here being likely to mean the Gall Ghaedil kingdoms rather than the Gaelic kingdoms. It "brings to mind Swein Forkbeard's putative activities in the Irish Sea and Adam of Bremen's story of his stay with a rex Scothorum (? king of the Irish) [&] can also be linked to... Iehmarc, who submitted in 1031 [&] could be relevant to Cnut's relations with the Irish".

== Relations with the Church ==
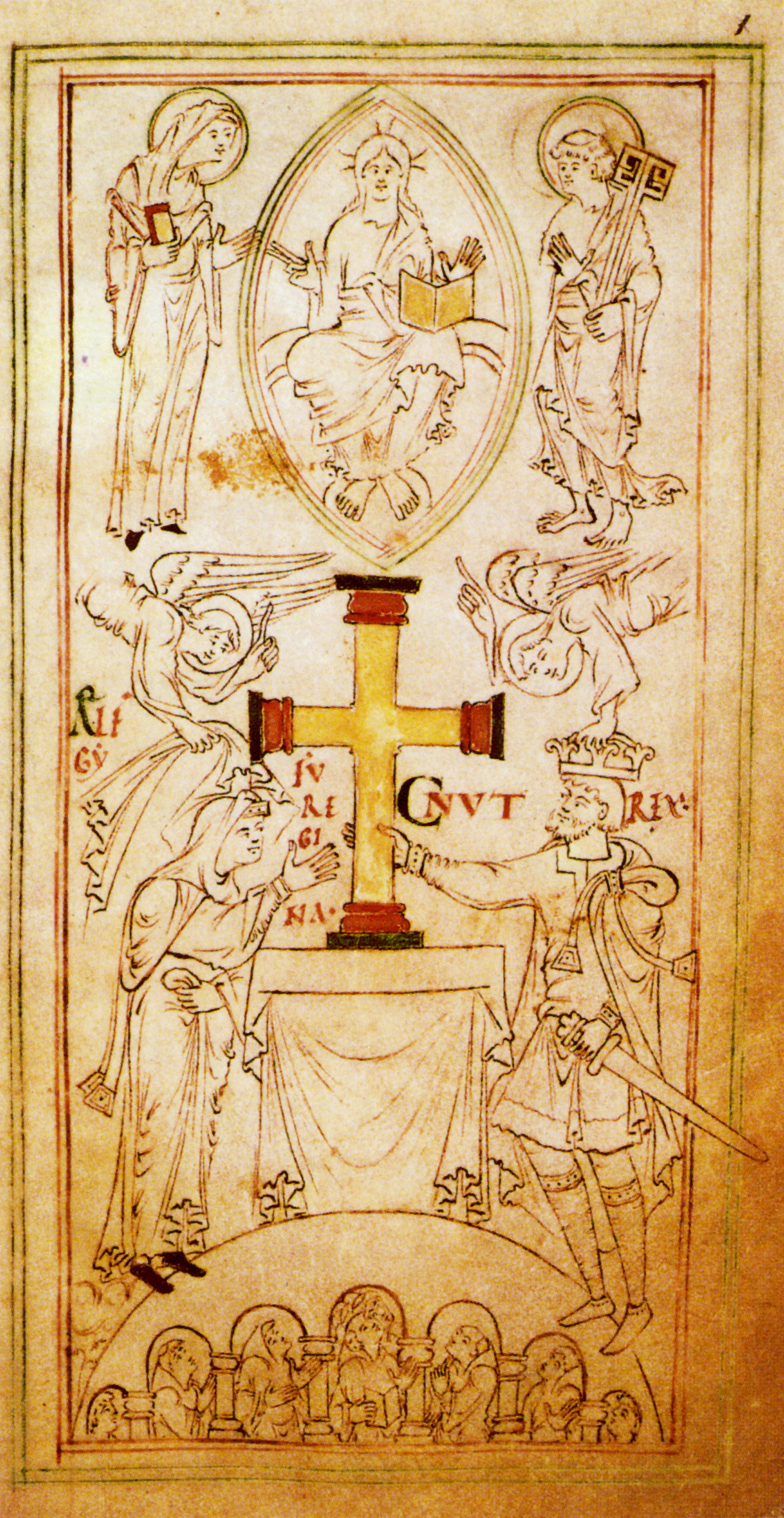
Angels crown Cnut as he and Emma of Normandy (Ælfgifu) present a large gold cross to Hyde Abbey in Winchester. From the New Minster Liber Vitae in the British Library.

Cnut's actions as a conqueror and his ruthless treatment of the overthrown dynasty had made him uneasy with the Church. He was already a Christian before he was king – being named Lambert at his baptism – although the Christianization of Scandinavia was not at all complete. His marriage to Emma of Normandy, even though he was already married to Ælfgifu of Northampton, who was kept in the south with an estate in Exeter, was another conflict with Church teaching. In an effort to reconcile himself with his churchmen, Cnut repaired all the English churches and monasteries that were victims of Viking plunder and refilled their coffers. He also built new churches and was an earnest patron of monastic communities. His homeland of Denmark was a Christian nation on the rise, and the desire to enhance the religion was still fresh. As an example, the first stone church recorded to have been built in Scandinavia was in Roskilde, c. 1027, and its patron was Cnut's sister Estrid.

It is difficult to ascertain whether Cnut's attitude towards the Church derived from deep religious devotion or was merely a means to reinforce his regime's hold on the people. There is evidence of respect for the pagan religion in his praise poetry, which he was happy enough for his skalds to embellish in Norse mythology, while other Viking leaders were insistent on the rigid observation of the Christian line, like St Olaf. Yet he also displays the desire for a respectable Christian nationhood within Europe. In 1018, some sources suggest he was at Canterbury on the return of its Archbishop Lyfing from Rome, to receive letters of exhortation from the Pope. If this chronology is correct, he probably went from Canterbury to the Witan at Oxford, with Archbishop Wulfstan of York in attendance, to record the event.

His ecumenical gifts were widespread and often exuberant. Commonly held land was given, along with exemption from taxes as well as relics. Christ Church was probably given rights at the important port of Sandwich as well as tax exemption, with confirmation in the placement of their charters on the altar, while it got the relics of St Ælfheah, at the displeasure of the people of London. Another see in the king's favour was Winchester, second only to the Canterbury see in terms of wealth. The New Minster Liber Vitae records Cnut as a benefactor of the monastery, and the Winchester Cross, with 500 marks of silver and 30 marks of gold, as well as relics of various saints was given to it. Old Minster was the recipient of a shrine for the relics of St Birinus and the probable confirmation of its privileges. The monastery at Evesham, with its Abbot Ælfweard purportedly a relative of the king through Ælfgifu the Lady (probably Ælfgifu of Northampton, rather than Queen Emma, also known as Ælfgifu), got the relics of St Wigstan. While some English approved of these policies, which his skalds called "destroying treasure", the burden of taxation was widely felt. His attitude towards London's see was clearly not benign. The monasteries at Ely and Glastonbury were apparently not on good terms either.

Other gifts were also given to his neighbours. Among these was one to Chartres, of which its bishop wrote: "When we saw the gift that you sent us, we were amazed at your knowledge as well as your faith ... since you, whom we had heard to be a pagan prince, we now know to be not only a Christian, but also a most generous donor to God's churches and servants". He is known to have sent a psalter and sacramentary made in Peterborough (famous for its illustrations) to Cologne, and a book written in gold, among other gifts, to William the Great of Aquitaine. This golden book was apparently to support Aquitanian claims of St Martial, patron saint of Aquitaine, as an apostle. Of some consequence, its recipient was an avid artisan, scholar and devout Christian, and the Abbey of Saint-Martial was a great library and scriptorium, second only to the one at Cluny. It is likely that Cnut's gifts were well beyond historian's current knowledge.

Cnut's journey to Rome in 1027 is another sign of his dedication to the Christian religion. It may be that he went to attend the coronation of Conrad II in order to improve relations between the two powers, yet he had previously made a vow to seek the favour of St Peter, the keeper of the keys to the heavenly kingdom. While in Rome, Cnut made an agreement with the Pope to reduce the fees paid by the English archbishops to receive their pallium. He also arranged that travellers from his realm not be straitened by unjust tolls and that they should be safeguarded on their way to and from Rome. Some evidence exists for a second journey in 1030.

== Death and succession ==
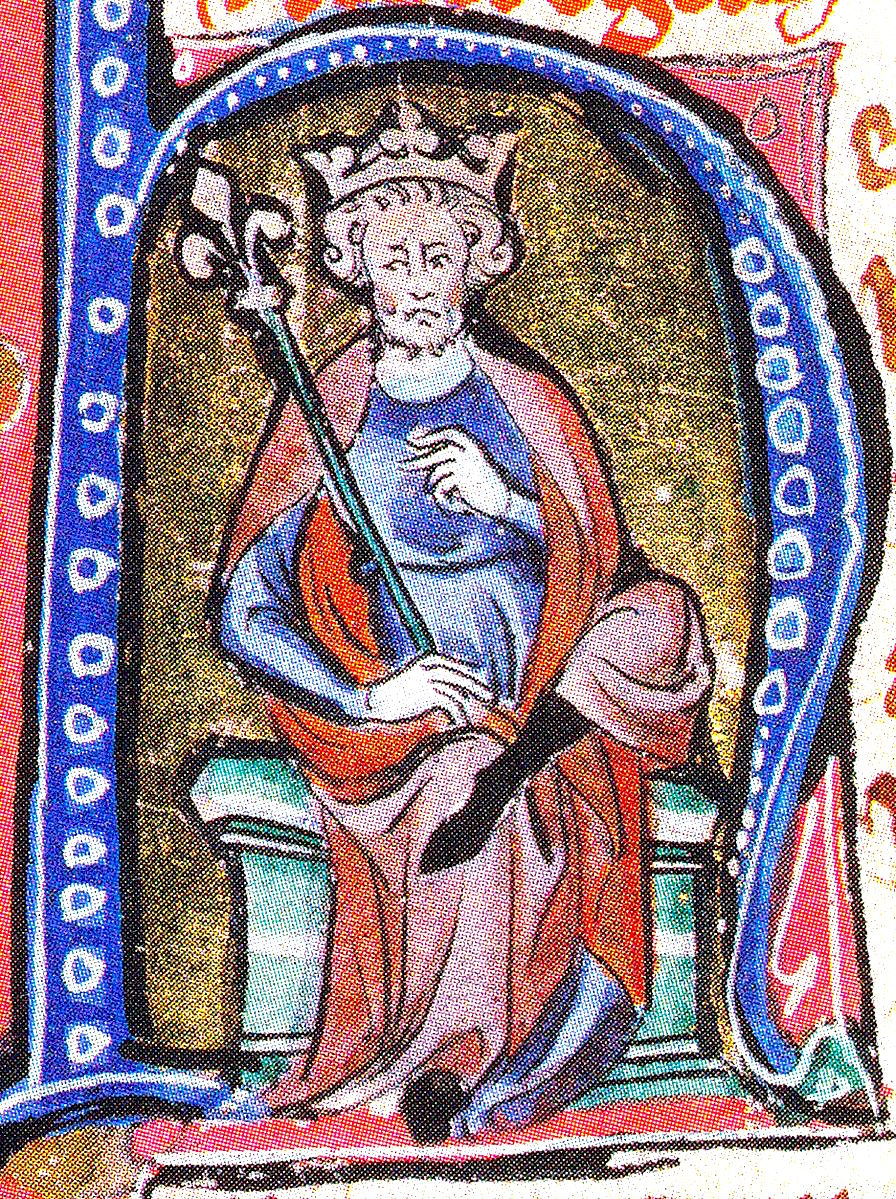
14th-century portrait of Cnut the Great

Cnut died on 12 November 1035 in Shaftesbury, Dorset. In Denmark, he was succeeded by Harthacnut, reigning as Cnut III, although with a war in Scandinavia against Magnus I of Norway, Harthacnut was "forsaken [by the English] because he was too long in Denmark". His mother Queen Emma, previously resident at Winchester with some of her son's housecarls, was made to flee to Bruges in the County of Flanders, under pressure from supporters of Cnut's other son, after Svein, by Ælfgifu of Northampton: Harold Harefoot – regent in England 1035–1037 (who went on to claim the English throne in 1037, reigning until his death in 1040). Eventual peace in Scandinavia left Harthacnut free to claim the throne himself in 1040 and to regain for his mother her place. He brought the crowns of Denmark and England together again until his death in 1042. Denmark fell into a period of disorder with a power struggle between the pretender to the throne Sweyn Estridsson, son of Ulf, and the Norwegian king, until the death of Magnus in 1047.

If the sons of Cnut had not died within a decade of his death, and if his only known daughter Gunhilda, who was to marry Conrad II's son Henry III eight months after his death, had not died in Italy before she could become empress consort, Cnut's reign might well have been the foundation for a complete political union between England and Scandinavia, a North Sea Empire with blood ties to the Holy Roman Empire.

=== Bones at Winchester ===
Cnut was buried in the Old Minster, Winchester. Following the events of 1066, the new Norman regime was keen to signal its authority with an ambitious programme of grandiose cathedrals and castles, which proceeded throughout the High Middle Ages. Winchester Cathedral was built on the old Anglo-Saxon site and the previous burials, including Cnut's, were set in mortuary chests there. During the English Civil War in the 17th century, plundering Roundhead soldiers scattered the bones of Cnut on the floor and they were spread amongst the various other chests, notably those of William Rufus. After the restoration of the monarchy, the bones were collected and replaced in their chests, although somewhat out of order.

== Marriages and children ==
- 1 – Ælfgifu of Northampton
  - Sweyn Knutsson, King of Norway;
  - Harold Harefoot, King of England.
- 2 – Emma of Normandy
  - Harthacnut, King of Denmark and England;
  - Gunhilda of Denmark, wed Henry III, Holy Roman Emperor.

== Family tree ==
Cnut the Great family tree

Gorm the Old	Thyra	Rollo	Poppa of Bayeux
Harald Bluetooth	Burislav	none recorded	William Longsword	Sprota
Swein Forkbeard	Gunhild of Wenden	Gunnor	Richard I of Normandy
Ælfgifu of Northampton	Cnut the Great	Emma of Normandy	Æthelred the Unready	Ælfgifu of York	Richard II of Normandy	Judith of Brittany
Svein Knutsson	Harold Harefoot	Gunhilda of Denmark	Alfred Ætheling	Edmund Ironside	Ealdgyth	Robert I of Normandy	Herleva
Gytha Thorkelsdóttir	Godwin, Earl of Wessex	Harthacnut	Edward the Exile	Agatha	William the Conqueror	Matilda of Flanders
Sweyn Godwinson	Harold Godwinson	Tostig Godwinson	Edith of Wessex	Edward the Confessor	Edgar Ætheling	Cristina
Gyrth, Gunhild, Ælfgifu, Leofwine & Wulfnoth	Malcolm III of Scotland	Margaret
Other children	Matilda of Scotland	Henry I of England

== Cnut's skalds ==
The Old Norse catalogue of skalds known as Skáldatal lists eight skalds who were active at Cnut's court. Four of them, namely Sigvatr Þórðarson, Óttarr svarti, Þórarinn loftunga and Hallvarðr háreksblesi, composed verses in honour of Cnut which have survived in some form, while no such thing is apparent from the four other skalds Bersi Torfuson, Arnórr Þórðarson jarlaskáld (known from other works), Steinn Skaptason and Óðarkeptr (unknown). The principal works for Cnut are the three Knútsdrápur by Sigvatr Þórðarson, Óttarr svarti and Hallvarðr háreksblesi, and the Höfuðlausn and Tøgdrápa by Þórarinn loftunga. Cnut also features in two other contemporary skaldic poems, namely Þórðr Kolbeinsson's Eiríksdrápa and the anonymous Liðsmannaflokkr.

Cnut's skalds emphasise the parallelism between Cnut's rule of his earthly kingdom and God's rule of Heaven. This is particularly apparent in their refrains. Thus the refrain of Þórarinn's Höfuðlausn translates to "Cnut protects the land as the guardian of Byzantium [God] [does] Heaven" and the refrain of Hallvarðr's Knútsdrápa translates to "Cnut protects the land as the Lord of all [does] the splendid hall of the mountains [Heaven]". Despite the Christian message, the poets also make use of traditional pagan references and this is particularly true of Hallvarðr. As an example, one of his half-stanzas translates to "The Freyr of the noise of weapons [warrior] has also cast under him Norway; the battle-server [warrior] diminishes the hunger of the valcyrie's hawks [ravens]." The skald here refers to Cnut as "Freyr of battle", a kenning using the name of the pagan god Freyr. References of this sort were avoided by poets composing for the contemporary kings of Norway but Cnut seems to have had a more relaxed attitude towards pagan literary allusions.

== The story of Cnut and the waves ==
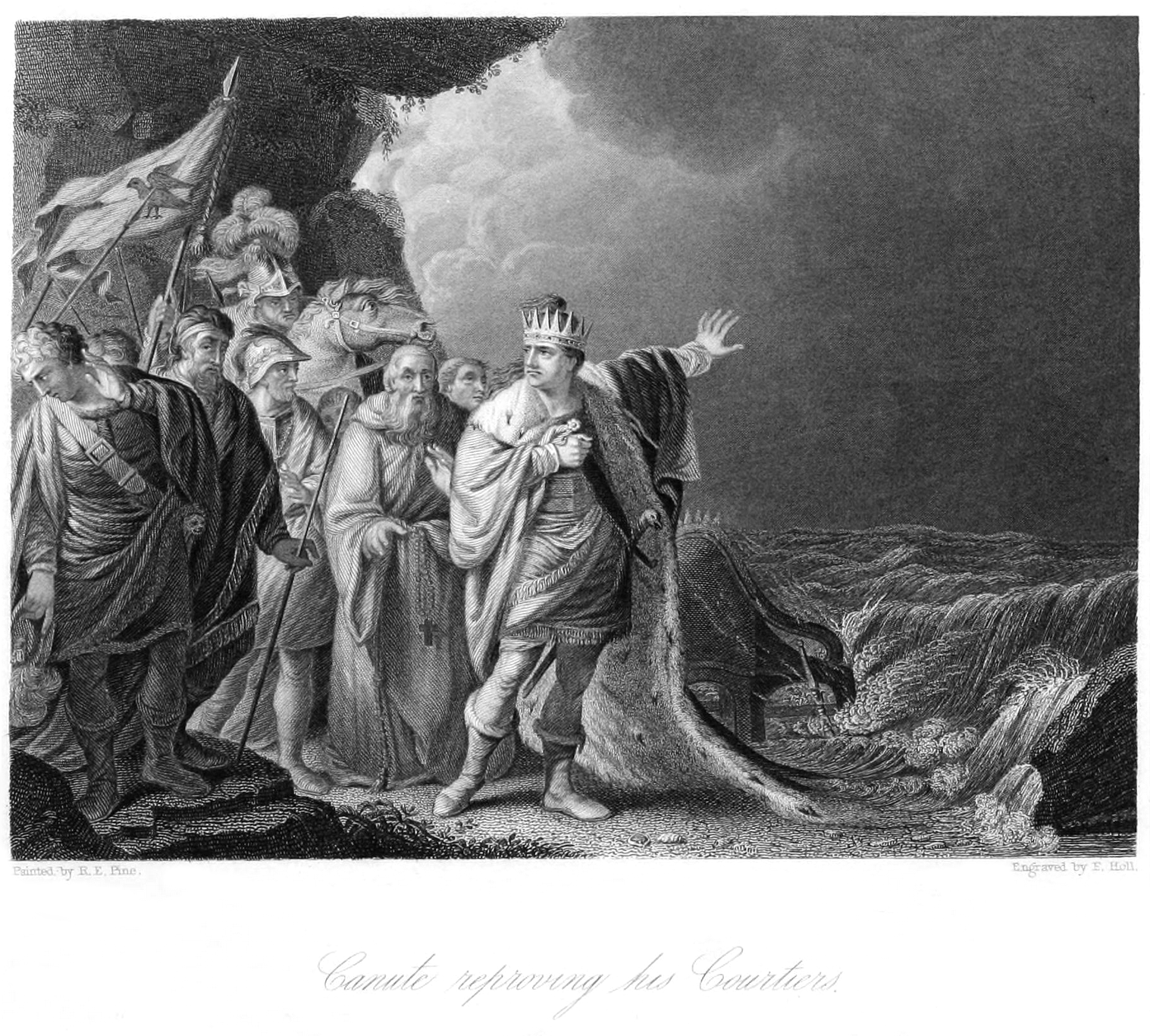
Canute Reproving His Courtiers (1848)

This story of Cnut resisting the incoming tide was first recorded by Henry of Huntingdon in his Historia Anglorum in the early twelfth century:

When he was at the height of his ascendancy, he ordered his chair to be placed on the sea-shore as the tide was coming in. Then he said to the rising tide, "You are subject to me, as the land on which I am sitting is mine, and no one has resisted my overlordship with impunity. I command you, therefore, not to rise on to my land, nor to presume to wet the clothing or limbs of your master." But the sea came up as usual, and disrespectfully drenched the king's feet and shins. So jumping back, the king cried, "Let all the world know that the power of kings is empty and worthless, and there is no king worthy of the name save Him by whose will heaven, earth and the sea obey eternal laws."

This has become by far the best known story about Cnut, although in modern readings he is usually a wise man who knows from the start that he cannot control the waves.

== See also ==
- North Sea Empire
- Raven banner
- Viking Age

== Sources ==
- Adam of Bremen (1917), Gesta Hammaburgensis ecclesiae pontificum, or History of the Archbishops of Hamburg-Bremen. English translation by F. J. Tschan., Hamburg: Hahnuni
- Bartlett, W. B. (2016). King Cnut and the Viking Conquest of England 1016. Amberley. ISBN 978-1-4456-4592-6. Archived from the original on 14 April 2023.
- Bolton, Timothy (2017). Cnut the Great. New Haven, USA: Yale University Press. ISBN 978-0-300-20833-7.
- Campbell, Alistair, ed. (1998), Encomium Emmae Reginae, London: Cambridge University
- Coke, Sir Edward; Hargrave, Francis (1853). The First Part of the Institutes of the Laws of England, Or, A Commentary Upon Littleton: Not the Name of the Author Only, But of the Law Itself. Robert H. Small. Archived from the original on 14 April 2023.
- Ellis, P. B. (1993), Celt & Saxon, Suffolk: St. Edmundsbury Press
- Forte, Angelo; Oram, Richard D.; Pedersen, Frederik (2005). Viking Empires. Cambridge: University Press. ISBN 978-0-521-82992-2. Archived from the original on 5 April 2023.
- Frank, R. (1999), "King Cnut in the verse of his skalds", in Alexander R. Rumble (ed.), The Reign of Cnut: King of England, Denmark and Norway, London: Leicester University Press, ISBN 0-7185-0205-1
- Graham-Campbell, James; Hall, Richard; Jesch, Judith; Parsons, David N (2016). Vikings and the Danelaw. Oxbow Books. ISBN 978-1-78570-455-0. Archived from the original on 14 April 2023.
- Greenway, Diana, ed. (1996). Henry, Archdeacon of Huntingdon, Historia Anglorum The History of the English People (in Latin and English). Oxford, UK: Clarendon Press. ISBN 978-0-19-822224-8.
- Hagerman, Maja (1996), Spåren av kungens män, Rabén Prisma
- Hudson, B. T. (1994), Knutr & Viking Dublin, Scandinavian Studies
- Jones, Gwyn (1984), A History of the Vikings (2nd ed.), Oxford: Oxford University Press, ISBN 0-19-285139-X
- Keynes, Simon (8 October 2009). "Æthelred II [Ethelred; known as Ethelred the Unready] (c. 966–1016), king of England". Oxford Dictionary of National Biography (online ed.). Oxford University Press. doi:10.1093/ref:odnb/8915. (Subscription, Wikipedia Library access or UK public library membership required.)
- Lawson, M. K. (2004), Cnut: England's Viking King (2nd ed.), Stroud: Tempus, ISBN 0-7524-2964-7, archived from the original on 14 April 2023
- Lawson, M. K. (2013). "Cnut [Canute] (d. 1035)". Oxford Dictionary of National Biography (online ed.). Oxford University Press. doi:10.1093/ref:odnb/4579. (Subscription, Wikipedia Library access or UK public library membership required.)
- Lund, Niels (1994). "Cnut's Danish Kingdom". In Rumble, Alexander (ed.). The Reign of Cnut, King of England, Denmark and Norway. London, UK: Leicester University Press. pp. 27–42. ISBN 978-0-7185-0205-8.
- McGettigan, Darren (2013). The Battle of Clontarf: Good Friday 1014. Dublin: Four Courts Press. ISBN 9781846823848.
- Ní Mhaonaigh, Máire (2018). "Perception and Reality: Ireland c.980–1229". In Smith, Brendan (ed.). The Cambridge History of Ireland. Cambridge: Cambridge University Press.
- Olsen, Olaf (1992). "Christianity & Churches". In Else Roesdahl; David Mackenzie Wilson (eds.). From Viking to Crusader: The Scandinavians and Europe, 800–1200. Random House. ISBN 978-0-8478-1625-5. Archived from the original on 14 April 2023.
- Ranelagh, John O'Bernie (2001), A Short History of Ireland, Cambridge: Cambridge University Press, ISBN 0-521-46944-9
- Richards, Mary P. (2010). "I-II Cnut: Wulfstan's Summa?". In Stefan Jurasinski; Lisi Oliver; Andrew Rabin (eds.). English Law Before Magna Carta: Felix Liebermann and "Die Gesetze der Angelsachsen". Medieval Law and Its Practice. Vol. 8. Leiden: Brill. pp. 137–156. doi:10.1163/ej.9789004187566.i-330.31. ISBN 9789004187573.
- Sawyer, P. (1991), När Sverige blev Sverige (Occasional papers on medieval topics), Alingsås: Viktoria
- Sawyer, P. (1997), The Oxford Illustrated History of the Vikings (1st ed.), Oxford: Oxford University Press, ISBN 0-19-820526-0
- Sawyer, Peter (2004). "Swein [Sveinn Haraldsson, Sveinn Tjúguskegg, Swein Forkbeard] (d. 1014)". Oxford Dictionary of National Biography. Oxford University Press. doi:10.1093/ref:odnb/26830. (subscription, Wikipedia Library access or UK public library membership required)
- Snorri Sturluson (1990), Heimskringla, or The Lives of the Norse Kings. English translation by Erling Monsen & A. H. Smith., Mineola, New York: Dover Publications, Inc., ISBN 0-486-26366-5
- Somerville, Angus A.; McDonald, R. Andrew (2014). The Viking Age: A Reader, Second Edition. University of Toronto Press. ISBN 978-1-4426-0870-2. Archived from the original on 14 April 2023.
- Stafford, Pauline (2004). "Ælfgifu [Ælfgifu of Northampton] (fl. 1006–1036)". Oxford Dictionary of National Biography. Oxford University Press. doi:10.1093/ref:odnb/180. ISBN 978-0-19-861412-8. Archived from the original on 11 September 2021. (subscription, Wikipedia Library access or UK public library membership required)
- Stenton, Frank (1971). Anglo-Saxon England. Oxford: Clarendon Press. ISBN 978-0-19-821716-9. Archived from the original on 14 April 2023.
- Swanton, Michael, ed. (1996), The Anglo-Saxon Chronicle, New York: Routledge, ISBN 0-415-92129-5
- Thietmar (1962) Chronik: Chronicon; Neu übertragen und erläutert von Werner Trillmich. Darmstadt: Wissenschaftliche Buchgesellschaft
- Townend, Matthew (2012). "(Introduction to) Sigvatr Þórðarson, Knútsdrápa.". In Whaley, Diana; Townend, Matthew (eds.). Poetry from the Kings' Sagas 1: From Mythical Times to c. 1035. Skaldic Poetry of the Scandinavian Middle Ages 1. Turnhout: Brepols. pp. 651–663. ISBN 978-2-503-51896-1.
- Trow, M. J. (2005), Cnut – Emperor of the North, Stroud: Sutton, ISBN 0-7509-3387-9
- William of Malmesbury (1998), Gesta Regnum Anglorum. English translation by R.A.B. Mynors, Oxford: Clarendon Press

Regnal titles
Preceded by Edmund Ironside as King of the English	King of England; 1016–1035	Succeeded by Harold Harefoot
Preceded by Harald II	King of Denmark; 1018–1035	Succeeded by Harthacnut
Preceded by Saint Olaf	King of Norway; 1028–1035 with Hákon Eiríksson (1028–1029); Sveinn Alfífuson (1030–1035)	Succeeded by Magnus the Good
