= Confraternity book =

Medieval register of the brotherhood of a church or monastery

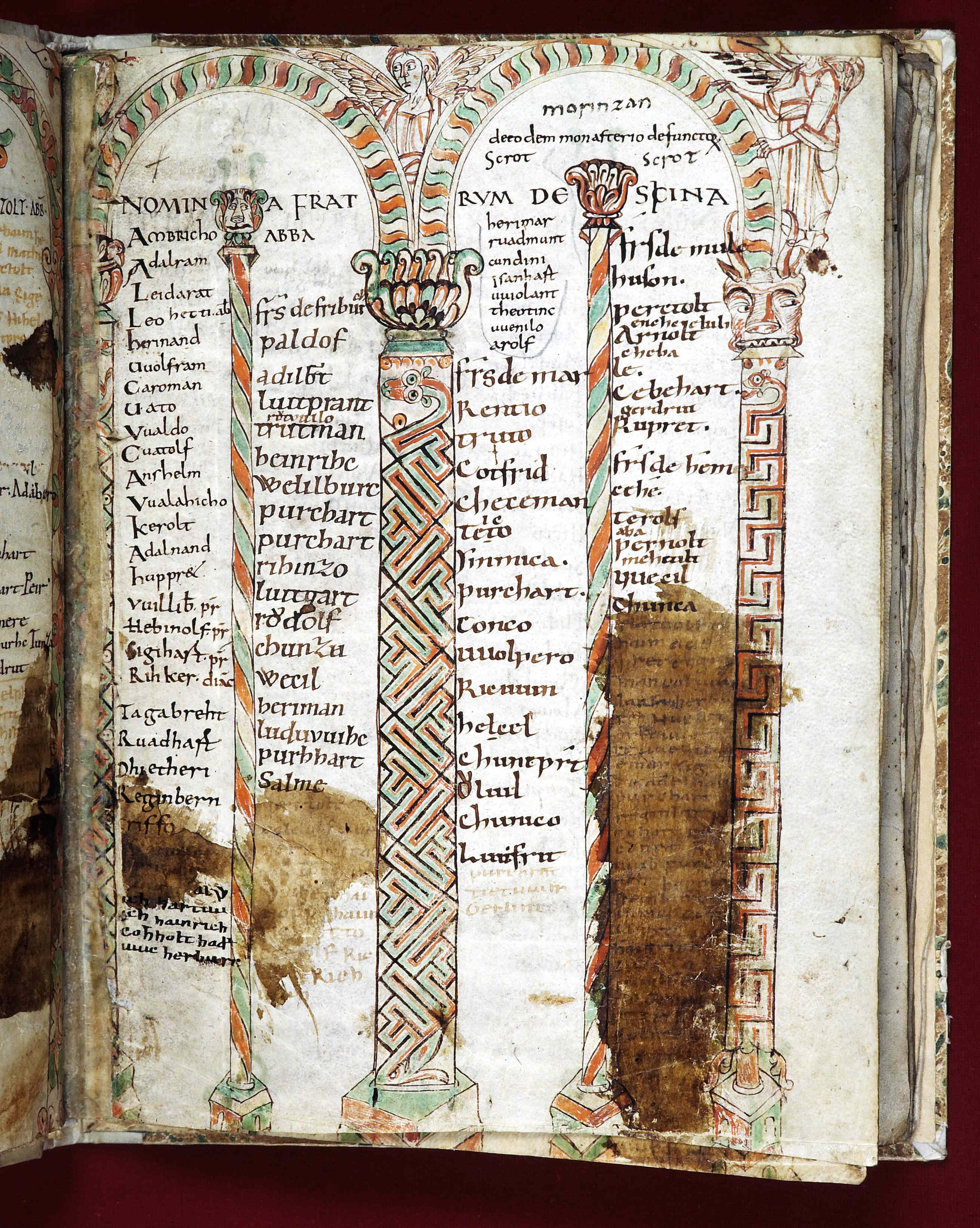
Confraternity book of the Abbey of Saint Gall.

A confraternity book (German: Verbrüderungsbuch, Latin: liber confraternitatum or confraternitatis), also called a liber memorialis (memorial book) or liber vitae (book of life), is a medieval register of the names of people who had entered into a state of spiritual brotherhood (confraternity) with a church or monastery in some way, often by visiting it in the capacity of a pilgrim. Persons named in such a book were actively remembered in the prayers of the priests or monks. In many cases these books were established as early as the 8th century and continued up to the 13th century. So-called Jahrtagsbücher (year books) are in many ways their successors.

Confraternity books are a rich source for prosopography and historical linguistics of the early Middle Ages.

== List of confraternity books ==
The following is a list of some earlier medieval confraternity books:

- Confraternity book of the Abbey of Saint Gall
- Confraternity book of Reichenau Abbey
- Confraternity book of St Peter's Abbey, Salzburg
- Liber memorialis of Remiremont Abbey
- Liber Vitae of the Imperial Abbey of Corvey
- Liber Vitae of Durham
- Liber Vitae of the New Minster, Winchester and Hyde Abbey
- Liber Viventium of Pfäfers Abbey, Switzerland
- Memorial and Liturgiecodex of San Salvatore, Italy

== Sources ==
- Geuenich, Dieter (2004), "A Survey of the Early Medieval Confraternity Books from the Continent", in Rollason, David (ed.), The Durham Liber Vitae and Its Context, Woodbridge: Boydell Press, pp. 141–148, ISBN 1-84383-060-4
- Piper, Paulus (ed.): Libri Confraternitatum Sancti Galli Augiensis Fabariensis. In: Monumenta Germaniae Historica. Berlin 1894 (transcription of the Verbrüderungsbuch of St. Gallen with commentary)
- Beyerle, Franz "Die Fratres de Friburch im St. Galler Verbrüderungsbuch." in Schau-ins-Land. Breisgau-Verein Schau-ins-Land: Freiburg im Breisgau, 1954
