= Óttarr svarti =

11th-century Icelandic skald

Óttarr svarti (Note: Old Norse pronunciation: Old Norse pronunciation: [ˈoːtːˌɑrː ˈswɑrte]; Modern Icelandic: Óttar svarti [ˈouhtˌaːr ˈsvar̥tɪ]; Modern Norwegian: Ottar Svarte; Modern Swedish: Ottar svarte) ("Óttarr the Black") was an 11th-century Icelandic skald. He was the court poet first of Óláfr skautkonungr of Sweden, then of Óláfr Haraldsson of Norway, the Swedish king Anund Jacob and finally of Cnut the Great of Denmark and England. His poems are significant contemporary evidence for the careers of Óláfr Haraldsson and Cnut the Great.

Óttarr was the nephew of Sigvatr Þórðarson, and Óttarr clearly based the poem Hǫfuðlausn, his encomium for Óláfr Haraldsson, on Sigvatr's Víkingarvísur, which tallies the king's early Viking expeditions. A small þáttr (short story) on Óttarr, Óttars þáttr svarta, is preserved in Flateyjarbók, Bergsbók, Bæjarbók and Tómasskinna.

== Works ==
1. Óláfsdrápa sœnska. Verses for the Swedish king Olof Skötkonung.
2. Höfuðlausn (also spelled as Hǫfuðlausn).
3. Knútsdrápa. Verses for Cnut the Great. Knútsdrápur composed by other poets include those of Sigvatr Þórðarson and Hallvarðr háreksblesi.
4. Lausavísur.

A recent review of the origins of the nursery rhyme London Bridge is Falling Down has debunked the popularly held belief that it enshrines an English folk memory of a Viking attack on London, sometimes connected with an attack in 1014 for which a stanza from Óttarr's Höfuðlausn is the earliest source.
