= Durham Liber Vitae =

- London, British Library, MS Cotton Domitian vii
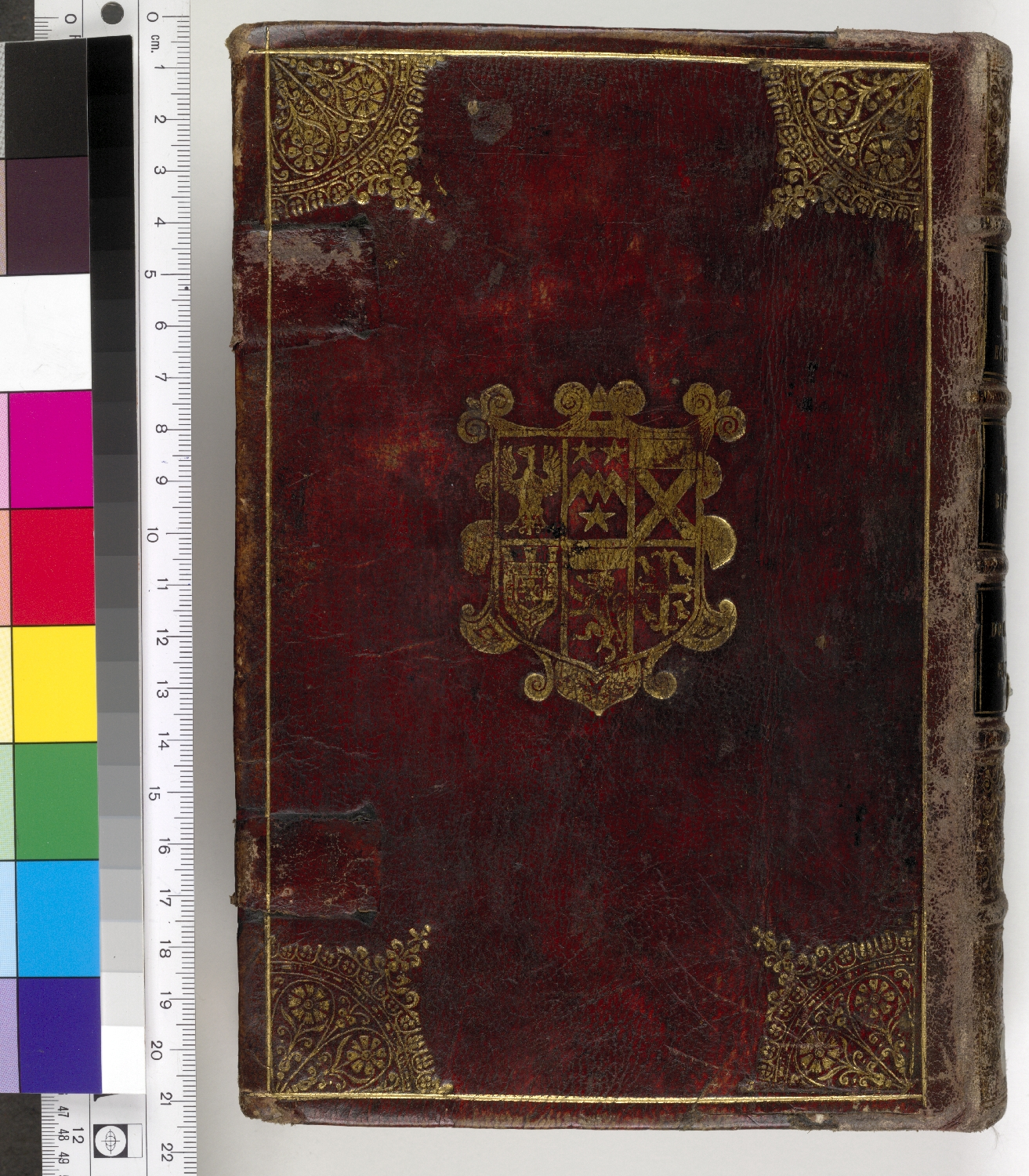
- Type: liber vitae, confraternity book
- Date: 9th century, with additions being made until c. 1300 and, to a lesser extent, also at later dates
- Place of origin: Northumbria
- Scribe: multiple
- Material: parchment
- Size: 205 x 142 mm
- Condition: original binding lost, some damage over time
- Script: various
- Additions: names of benefactors and visitors

The Durham Liber Vitae is a confraternity book produced in north-eastern England in the Middle Ages. It records the names of visitors to the church of the bishopric of Durham, and its predecessor sees at Lindisfarne and Chester-le-Street. In England, it is the oldest book of this type, although it is paralleled by later English confraternity books, most notably the New Minster Liber Vitae.

== Original Anglo-Saxon Liber Vitae ==
The text was originally of the 9th century, but was continually supplemented thereafter by entries made in the 10th century and later.

The 9th-century core constitutes folios 15–45, with folio 47. It is generally believed by scholars that it was produced in the church of Lindisfarne, though Monkwearmouth-Jarrow monasteries have also been suggested. This had been composed c. 840. It has been damaged over time, and the original binding is now lost. It consisted of parchment sheets on which were written lists of names, followed by blank sections for future additions.

The book was at Durham by the later 11th century, as indicated by the list of Durham monks on folio 45 from the episcopate of Ranulf Flambard. Later additions to the early core were made to folios 24r, 36r, 44v and 45r.

== High and Later Middle Ages ==
The book was reorganised in the third quarter of the 12th century, and it is likely that many of the names originally there did not survive. The form it attained at that point appears to be the one it kept until the 15th century, although it was continually updated with new entries. After 1300 very few names were added to the original core.

The Liber Vitae is currently in the British Library, where it is classified as BL, MS Cotton Domitian vii. The manuscript itself is 205 x 142 mm.

== Sources ==
- Briggs, Elizabeth (2004), "The Original Core of the Durham Liber Vitae", in Rollason, David (ed.), The Durham Liber Vitae and Its Context, Woodbridge: Boydell Press, pp. 63–86, ISBN 1-84383-060-4
- Gerchow, Jan (2004), "The Origins of the Durham Liber Vitae", in Rollason, David (ed.), The Durham Liber Vitae and Its Context, Woodbridge: Boydell Press, pp. 45–62, ISBN 1-84383-060-4
- Keynes, Simon (2004), "The Liber Vitae of the New Minster Winchester", in Rollason, David (ed.), The Durham Liber Vitae and Its Context, Woodbridge: Boydell Press, pp. 149–64, ISBN 1-84383-060-4
- Rollason, David; Rollason, Lynda, eds. (2007), Durham Liber vitae : London, British Library, MS Cotton Domitian A.VII : edition and digital facsimile with introduction, codicological, prosopographical and linguistic commentary, and indexes including the Biographical Register of Durham Cathedral Priory (1083–1539) by A. J. Piper, 3 vols, vol. I, London: British Library, ISBN 0-7123-4995-2
- Stevenson, Joseph, ed. (1841), Liber Vitae Ecclesiae Dunelmensis: Nec Non Obituaria Duo Ejusdem Ecclesiae, J. B. Nichols and son. Also available from Internet Archive.
