= Knútsdrápa (Óttarr svarti) =

Old Norse poem composed for King Cnut

The Knútsdrápa by the skald Óttarr svarti (Óttar the Black) is one of the Old Norse poems composed for King Cnut. Knútsdrápur (plural of Knútsdrápa) are Old Norse skaldic compositions in the form of drápur which were recited for the praise of Cnut. Most of Óttarr's poem is cited in the Knýtlinga saga, while one stanza is known only from other sources such as the Heimskringla. It has been debated whether strophe 9 truly belongs to Óttarr's Knútsdrápa or to a poem which Óttarr composed for Cnut's father Svein Haraldsson.

The focus is on the deeds of its subject as a prince, and as a king, with the climax of his conquest of England, at the Battle of Assandun, in 1016, and with the Battle of the Helgeå, in 1026, when he was victorious over the Norwegian and Swedish kings who were in alliance against him, amongst its events. This skaldic verse's style and metre have been cause for some controversy, on the point of Canute's age. It is often difficult to understand, let alone translate Old Norse poems.

== The poem ==
Hratt lítt gamall, lýtir
lögreiðar, framm skeiðum;
fórat fylkir œri
folksveimuðr þér heiman;
hilmir bjótt ok hættir
harðbrynjuð skip kynjum;
reiðr hafðir þú rauðar
randir Knútr fyr landi.

Út fylgðu þér Jótar,
auðmildr, flugar trauðir,
skauthreina bjótt skreytir
Skánunga lið Vánar;
váð blés of þér vísi,
vestr settir þú flesta
(kunt gerðir þú þannig
þitt nafn) í haf stafna.

Herskjöld bart ok helduð
hilmir ríkr af slíku;
hykkat þengill þekðusk
þik kyrrsetu mikla;
ætt drapt, Jóta dróttinn,
Játgeirs í för þeiri;
þveit rakt (þrár est heitinn)
þeim stillis konr illan.

Brunnu byggðir manna
buðlungr fyr þér ungum,
opt lézt, hús ok, heiptar
herkall búendr gerva.

Gunni lézt í grœnni
gramr Lindisey framða,
beldu viðr þeir 's vildu
víkingar því ríki;
bíða lézt í breiðri
borg Helminga sorgir
œstr fyr Úsu vestan
engst folk, Svía þrengvir.

Ungr fylkir lézt Engla
allnær Tesu falla,
flóði djúpt of, dauða,
dík Norðimbra líkum;
svefn brauzt svörtum hrafni
sunnarr, hvötuðr Gunnar,
ollir sókn hinn snjalli
Sveins mögr at Skorsteini.

Fjörlausa hykk Frísi
friðskerðir þar gerðu,
brauzt með byggðu setri
Brandfurðu, þik randa;
Játmundar hlaut undir
ættniðr göfugr hættar,
danskr herr skaut þá dörrum
drótt, en þú rakt flótta.

Skjöldungr, vant und skildi
skœru verk, hinn sterki,
(fekk blóðtrani bráðir
brúnar) Assatúnum;
vátt, en valfall þótti
verðung, jöfurr sverði
nær fyr norðan stóru
nafn gnógt Danaskóga.

Bjóðr, vant brynjur rauðar,
blíðr stórgjafa, síðan
(lætr önd áðr þrek þrjóti
þinn) fyr Norðvík innan.

Framm gekt enn þars unnuð
(almr gall hátt) við malma,
[knáttut] slæ [þars sóttuð]
sverð [kastala verja];
unnuð eigi minni
(ulfs gómr veit þat) rómu,
hnekkir hleypiblakka
hlunns, á Tempsar grunni.

Svíum hnekðir þú, sóknar
siklingr örr, en mikla
ylgr, þars á hin helga,
ulfs beitu fekk, heitir;
helt, þars hrafn né svaltat,
(hvatráðr est þú) láði,
ógnar stafr, fyr jöfrum,
ýgr, tveimr (við kyn beima).

== Editions (external links) ==
- Matthew Towend (ed.), Skaldic Poetry of the Scandinavian Middle Ages.
- Jörmungrund. See here for sources.
