= Óláfsdrápa sænska =

Óláfsdrápa sænska ‘Drápa about Óláfr the Swede’ was a skaldic poem composed by Óttarr svarti in honour of the Swedish king Olof Skötkonung.

Óttarr spent some time with the Swedish king and worked eagerly for peace between Olof and the Norwegian king Olaf the Stout.

The remaining fragments of Óláfsdrápa sænska are of some value for our knowledge of the life of Olof Skötkonung as it contradicts Snorri Sturluson's depiction of Olof as a passive king. In Óláfsdrápa sænska Óttarr depicts Olof as having made glorious Viking expeditions in Eastern Europe.

The following is stanza 6 of the poem, as translated by Matthew Townend:

Fold verr folk-Baldr;
fár má konungr svá;
ǫrn reifir Ôleifr;
es framr Svía gramr.

The host-Baldr <god> [RULER] defends the land; few kings are able to do so; Óláfr gladdens the eagle; the ruler of the Swedes [= Óláfr] is outstanding.
