= New Minster Liber Vitae =

1031 English confraternity book

The New Minster Liber Vitae is a confraternity book produced in Winchester, in southern England, in 1031. It records the names of visitors to the New Minster, Winchester and contains other information too, as well as a contemporary image of King Cnut the Great and his second wife Queen Emma of Normandy (below right).

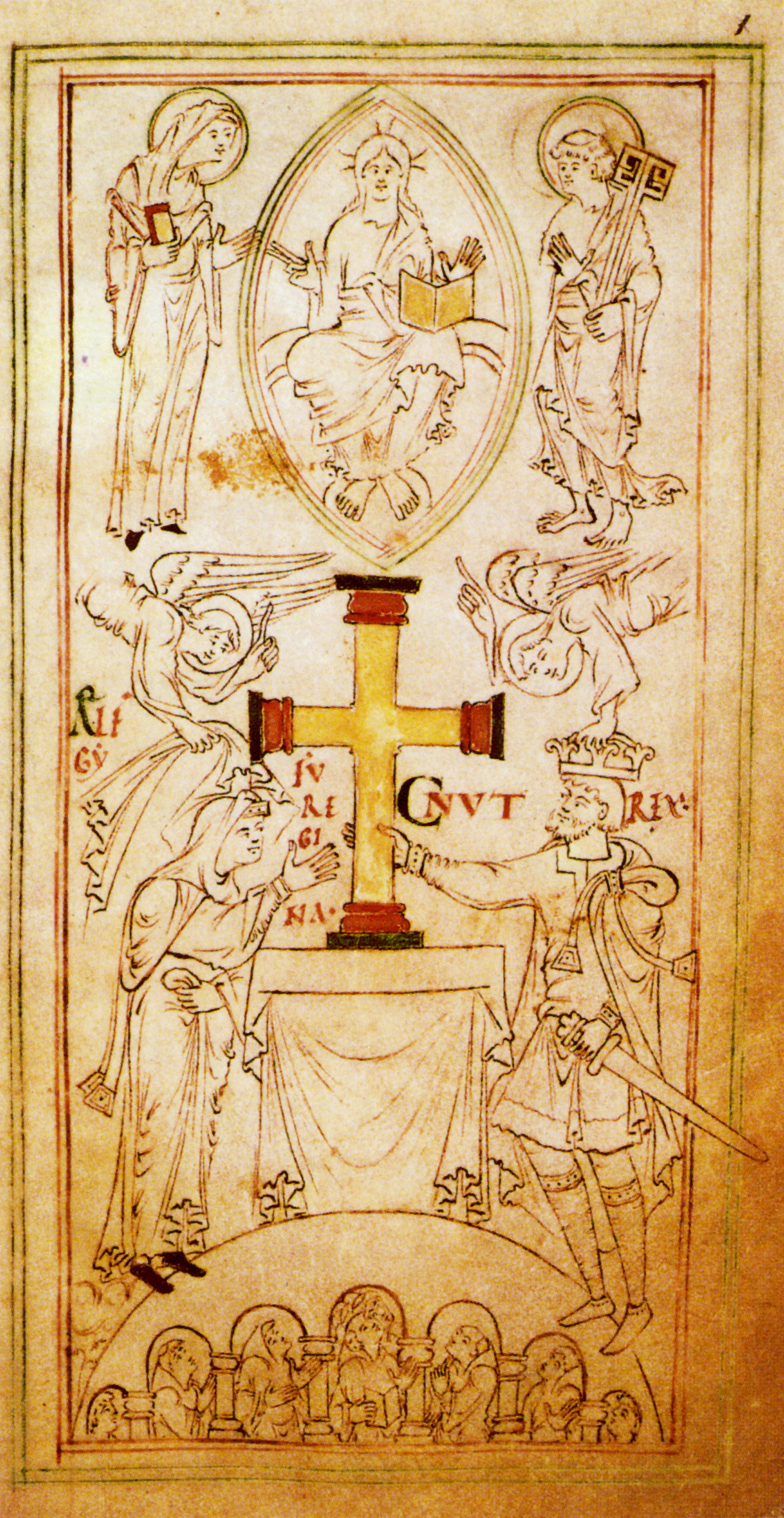
Liber Vitae, folio 6r

The original manuscript is now kept in the British Library in London, as Stowe MS 944. It and the Durham Liber Vitae are the only surviving Anglo-Saxon confraternity books.

On folio 29, a later writer has added the names of King Edward the Confessor, Queen Edith and the aetheling Edgar. In a recent article, Tom Licence has argued this list shows that Edgar was considered as King Edward's legitimate heir before Edward's death in 1066.

== Editions ==
- Birch, Walter de Gray, ed. (1892). Liber vitae : register and martyrology of New Minster and Hyde abbey, Winchester (in Latin). London: Simpkin. OCLC 37943147.
- Keynes, Simon, ed. (1996). The Liber vitae of the New Minster and Hyde Abbey, Winchester. Copenhagen: Rosenkilde & Bagger. ISBN 9788742305232. (facsimile)
