= Hallvarðr Háreksblesi =

Skald of Canute the Great

Hallvarðr Háreksblesi was one of the skalds of Canute the Great. Nothing is known about his life or family but eight fragments of his poetry on Canute have been preserved. While Hallvarðr's poetry resembles that of Canute's other poets in many respects it is unusual in its heavy use of pagan imagery.

== Extant fragments ==
Six fragments of poetry by Hallvarðr are quoted in the Skáldskaparmál section of Snorri Sturluson's Prose Edda. One additional fragment is quoted in Knýtlinga saga and one in Heimskringla and kings' sagas derived from it. In Finnur Jónsson's complete edition of skaldic poetry the fragments are conjectured to be all from the same poem, a Knútsdrápa ("Lay of Canute"), and arranged in a suggested order. The first complete English translation was published by Roberta Frank in 1994.

The extant fragments are mainly about Canute's expedition to England and his becoming king there in 1015–1016. Apart from what little can be conjectured from this, nothing is known about the poet's life or origin. Finnur Jónsson believed he became one of Canute's court poets after the king's conquest of Norway in 1028.

== Hallvarðr and other poets ==
The refrain of Hallvarðr's Knútsdrápa compares Knútr's role on earth to that of the Christian God in Heaven.

Knútr verr jörð sem ítran
alls dróttinn sal fjalla.

Cnut protects the land as the Lord of all [does] the splendid hall of the mountains [Heaven].

Hallvarðr's refrain is very similar to that composed by his fellow poet, Þórarinn loftunga, who also compared the roles of Canute and God in his Höfuðlausn. It is also reminiscent of the refrain of Gunnlaugr Wormtongue's poem about king Ethelred and, to a lesser extent, to those in Þórarinn loftunga's Tøgdrápa and Sighvatr Þórðarson's Knútsdrápa, both about King Canute.

Like Canute's other skalds, Hallvarðr emphasizes Canute's Danish ancestry and how his rule benefits Danish interests. He, however, differs somewhat from the other poets in describing Canute with imagery derived from Norse mythology, including references to valkyries, giants, the Midgard Serpent and the World Tree. In his kennings, he even refers to Canute with the names of pagan gods.

== Critical reception ==
Finnur Jónsson described Hallvarðr's poetic expressions as strong but not very original and the surviving verses as formally quite good but not very individual in character. Despite this, he noted that one of Hallvarðr's poems has an apparently new kenning for the breast (as seat of emotion and thought), based on the new religion; "the ship of prayer". Roberta Frank is more positive, describing Hallvarðr's poetry as "skaldic verse at its richest and most allusive, a startling blend of Christian and pagan imagery like that carved on the Gosforth cross."
