= Northman, son of Leofwine =

Mercian noble (died 1017)

Northman (died 1017) was a Mercian noble of the early 11th century. A member of a powerful Mercian kinship (clan), he is known primarily for receiving the village of Twywell in Northamptonshire from King Æthelred II in 1013, and for his death by order of King Cnut the Great (Canute) in 1017. His violent end by Cnut contrasts with the successful career enjoyed by his brother Leofric, as Earl of Mercia during Cnut's reign. Northman is believed to have been an associate of the troublesome ealdorman Eadric Streona, who was killed with him.

== Family and status ==
In the account of Northman's death by order of Cnut the Great, the chronicler John of Worcester styled Northman "... son of Leofwine, Ealdorman of the Hwicce", Dux ("duke", "ealdorman" or "warlord"). He is described as a brother of Leofric comes ("count" or "ealdorman"). No other source claims that Northman was an ealdorman, and so the authenticity of this account is in doubt.

Northman was the eldest of four known sons of Ealdorman Leofwine. The others were Leofric, later Earl of Mercia, Eadwine (died 1039), and Godwine (died 1055). Ealdorman Leofwine's father was a man named Ælfwine. Ælfwine is difficult to identify, but was possibly the Ælfwine killed at the Battle of Maldon in 991, and was possibly a son of Ælfric Cild, ealdorman of Mercia between 983 and 985.

== Charter appearances ==
Accurately tracing Northman within the witness-lists of Anglo-Saxon charters is difficult because of the contested authenticity of many of these charters, and because there was another magnate of that name, Northman of Escomb, a dux in Northumbria. A charter from Evesham Abbey, c. 989, describes a grant of land at Hampton, Worcestershire by King Æthelred II to a Northman minister (thegn); this charter is however regarded as spurious.

It is likely that Northman is the same as Northman Miles ("Northman the knight"), to whom in 1013 King Æthelred II granted the village of Twywell in Northamptonshire. This charter was preserved in the archives of Thorney Abbey, which in the 1050s was one of the abbeys controlled by Northman's kinsman, Leofric, Abbot of Peterborough.

Northman's last non-chronicle appearance is a subscription to a lease given by Wulfstan, Bishop of Worcester, to his brother Ælfwig.

== Death ==
Accounts of his death form the main sources of information about Northman. John of Worcester related that:

In July Cnut married Ælfgifu, that is Emma, Æthelred's widow, and at Christmas, when he was at London, ordered the treacherous Ealdorman Eadric (ducem Edricum) to be killed in the palace because he feared that some day he would be entrapped by Eadric's treachery, just as Eadric's former lords Æthelred and Edmund, that is Ironside, were frequently deceived, and he ordered his body to be thrown over the city wall, and left unburied. Ealdorman Northman, son of Ealdorman Leofwine, that is brother of Leofric the Ealdorman (dux Northmannus filius Leofuuini ducis, frater scilicet Leofrici comitis), and Brihtric, son of Ælfheah, governor of Devon, were killed with him, although blameless. The king made Leofric ealdorman (ducem) in place of his brother Northman, and afterwards held him in great affection.

John of Worcester's Chronicle was compiled between 1124 and 1140, but is derived from earlier sources, including a lost northern version of the Anglo-Saxon Chronicle, and likely saga material about Eadric Streona. The account in the surviving versions of the Anglo-Saxon Chronicle (in recensions C, D, E) is shorter, and does not give Northman the title of dux:

In this year [1017] King Cnut succeeded to all the kingdom of England and divided it into four, Wessex for himself, East Anglia for Thorkel, Mercia for Eadric, and Northumbria for Eric. And in this year Ealdorman Eadric was killed, and Northman, son of Ealdorman Leofwine, and Æthelweard, son of Æthelmær the Stout, and Brihtric, son of Ælfheah of Devonshire. And King Cnut exiled the atheling Eadwig and afterwards had him killed.

The Evesham Chronicle also noted Northman's death. It described him as a "powerful man" (potens homo), and that all Northman's lands were afterwards given to Ealdorman Leofric, his brother.

The Chronicle of Crowland Abbey, the reliability of which is doubted by some historians, says that Northman was a retainer of Eadric Streona, ealdorman in much of Mercia. It adds that Northman had been killed by Cnut for this reason. Despite the murder of Northman, his father Leofwine continued in his office until 1023, under the overlordship of the newly implanted Earl Hákon, and Northman's brother Leofric eventually became Earl of Mercia.
