= Ælfric Cild =

Ælfric Cild (fl. 975–985) was a wealthy Anglo-Saxon nobleman from the east Midlands, Ealdorman of Mercia between 983 and 985, and possibly brother-in-law to his predecessor Ælfhere. He was also associated with the monastic reformer Æthelwold, bishop of Winchester, he is also notable for being involved in a number of land transactions for the refounding and endowment of Peterborough Abbey, as well as with Thorney Abbey during the 970s and early 980s. He was exiled in 985 charged with treason, the details of which are not known.

== Family connections ==
Some places associated with Ælfric, shown on a map of present-day Cambridgeshire

It is thought that he married the daughter of Ealhhelm, ealdorman of central Mercia, and hence that he was brother-in-law to Ælfhere, ealdorman in Mercia between 956 and 983. Her name may have been Æthelflæd. Her brother Ælfheah, ealdorman in Wessex, left a will "probably drawn up in the late 960s" in which he bequeathed estates to Ælfwine, his "sister's son", who was probably Ælfric's son with her. This Ælfwine is also thought to be the warrior of this name who died fighting in the battle near Maldon (Essex, 991), according to the Old English heroic poem which was composed to commemorate the event (The Battle of Maldon).

It has been suggested that it may have been Ælfric Cild who in 956 received from King Eadwig land at Hanney and who is addressed as the king's adoptivus parens in the charter which records the transaction. The description has been interpreted as indicating that Ælfric had married into a family of royal rank and possibly that he "had a hand in raising the young Eadwig".

In some contemporary as well as older historical sources, Ælfric (a common Old English name) is distinguished by his cognomen Cild. Literally meaning "child", it is an Old English title borne by some Anglo-Saxon nobles and typically denotes a man of high rank. Ælfric appears to have been a wealthy landowner in Huntingdonshire, East Anglia, hence in the ealdormanry of Ælfhere's great rival Æthelwine.

== Ælfric Cild and Æthelwold ==
The sources for Ælfric's landed possessions associate him with Bishop Æthelwold's monastic reform in East Anglia. One of them is a charter, dated 973, which purports to confirm the acquisition of various estates by Bishop Æthelwold for the refoundation of Thorney Abbey. Although the charter is spurious in its present form, it is nevertheless thought to preserve an authentic core. The text reports that Ælfric, called miles, sold Water Newton, Huntingdonshire, to Æthelwold for 20 librae of silver. Although he initially contested the alleged outcome of the transaction, he consented on accepting from the bishop a further amount of silver (13 librae) as well as some land at Ræsen (possibly Market Rasen, Lincolnshire) and Titchmarsh, Northamptonshire. Æthelwold also acquired part of Yaxley from Ælfric. Another religious house re-established by Æthelwold was Peterborough Abbey. A list of sureties dating from Ælfric's time as ealdorman (983 x 985) suggests that it, too, acquired some of Ælfric's lands.

Ælfric is also found in the company of Bishop Æthelwold on other occasions. The Liber Eliensis specifies that the meeting of King Edgar at which Bishop Æthelwold bought land at Gransden, was attended by Ælfhere, Æthelwine and Ælfric Cild. According to the same source, Ælfric was joining Æthelwold, bishop of Winchester, the young ætheling Æthelred, "then an earl [comes]", and his mother Queen Ælfthryth when they were doing business at Ely Abbey sometime in the reign of King Edward the Martyr (975-978). The text remembers these years as a time "when the government of the kingdom was in disorder and the legal tenure of the land disrupted". Ælfric's presence may indicate that he belonged to a faction which supported Æthelred's claims to the throne, one which included Bishop Æthelwold.

== Ealdorman of Mercia (983-985) ==
Ælfric is associated with Ælfhere in a number of local transactions. Sometime between 971 and 980, Ælfric witnessed a charter, issued in the absence of the king, which records that Ælfhere sold land to Ordgar, abbot of Abingdon. The Liber Eliensis names Ælfhere, Æthelwine and Ælfric Cild as those present at a local council which was held at Slaughter, Gloucestershire sometime after King Edgar's death. This council dealt with a dispute about land at Hatfield.

When Ælfhere died in c. 983, Ælfric was appointed ealdorman in his place. The office was a powerful asset since under Ælfhere's tenure, its sphere of authority had grown to include not only central Mercia, but also parts of Mercia formerly controlled by ealdormen Æthelmund and Æthelstan Rota, that is, western Mercia (from Cheshire to Gloucestershire) and Oxfordshire and Buckinghamshire. Ælfric was not able to retain his new position for very long, however. Early in the year 985, a royal council was convened at Cirencester and Ælfric was driven out of the country on account of treason. The nature of the accusation is unknown, but it may be related to allegations that he had appropriated estates in Gloucestershire from a widowed matrona called Eadflæd, possibly Ælfhere's widow. These allegations are known from two royal diplomas which were issued around the turn of the century in favour of Abingdon Abbey.

In one of King Æthelred's so-called 'restitution charters', ealdorman Ælfric and Wulfgar, bishop of Ramsbury, are singled out as greedy men whose bad counsel had misled the king into violating the privileges of Abingdon Abbey, such as the right to elect its own abbot. Ælfric is said to have bribed the king and so to have bought the abbacy for his brother Eadwine. There is some uncertainty among historians as to whether this Ælfric, who is described as maior domus regis by the Historia Ecclesie Abbendonensis (History of Abingdon Abbey), refers to Ælfric Cild or to Ælfric, ealdorman of Hampshire (d. 1016).

== After 985 ==
It is not known when Ælfric died or what became of him in exile. The cartulary-chronicle Historia Ecclesie Abbendonensis written in the 12th century claims that he left for Denmark, assembled a band of Viking soldiers and returned to attack England. However, the text may have confused Ælfric Cild with his namesake, ealdorman of Hampshire, as it has done elsewhere.

Ælfric's son appears to be the Ælfwine who died fighting in the Battle of Maldon in 991. In the Maldon poem, he is portrayed as a young man in the personal household troop of Byrhtnoth, ealdorman of Essex, who led the fateful attack against the Viking army and in the event, perished himself. Following Byrhtnoth's death and the flight of several of his men, a speech is attributed to Ælfwine in which he urges his fellow warriors to remember the heroic boasts they made at the drinking table and exhorts them to avenge their lord, against all odds. Ælfwine is expressly identified as a son (bearn) of Ælfric, but in his speech, he is made to identify himself as a grandson of Ealhhelm (wis ealdorman) as well as a kinsman (mæge) of Byrhtnoth.

The next ealdorman known to have been given responsibilities in Mercia is Leofwine (d. 1016), who received the office in 994. It has been suggested that in the interim when the position of ealdorman remained vacant, Æthelsige, a king's thegn, may have been given "some position in Mercia".
