= Twywell =

Coordinates: 52.394°N 0.603°W

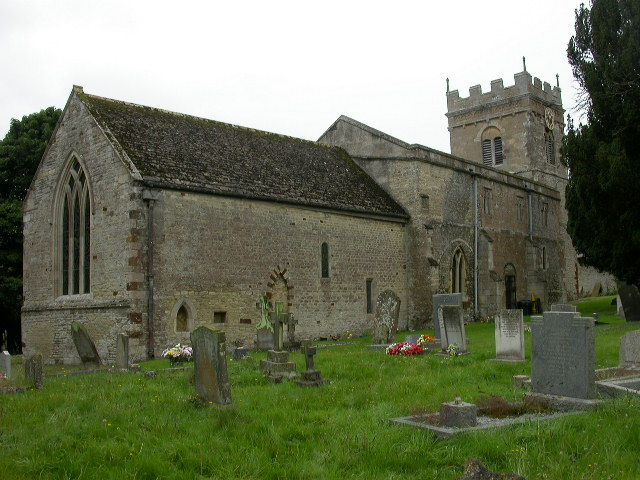
- The 12th-century church

- Location within Northamptonshire
- Population: 176 (2011 census)
- OS grid reference: SP950783
- Civil parish: Twywell
- Unitary authority: North Northamptonshire
- Ceremonial county: Northamptonshire
- Region: East Midlands
- Country: England
- Sovereign state: United Kingdom
- Post town: KETTERING
- Postcode district: NN14
- Police: Northamptonshire
- Fire: Northamptonshire
- Ambulance: East Midlands
- UK Parliament: Corby and East Northamptonshire

Twywell is an English village and civil parish in the county of Northamptonshire. Twywell Hills and Dales Country Park is adjacent. It lies just to the north of the A14 road, about three miles (5 km) west of Thrapston, and forms part of North Northamptonshire. At the time of the 2011 census, the population of the parish was 176.

== History ==
The name "Twywell" derives from two Old English words meaning two springs or streams.

Twywell is recorded in the Domesday Book as Twowelle but can be dated back to the Iron Age. It is likely that this manor was given to Northman miles ("Northman the knight") in 1013 by King Æthelred II. This Northman is thought to be Northman, son of Leofwine. The charter was preserved in the archives of Thorney Abbey, which in the 1050s was one of those controlled by Northman's relation Abbot Leofric of Peterborough.

Manor House Farm dates from 1591 and some of the building material is thought to have come from an old monastery situated between Slipton and Sudborough at a site known as "Money Holes".

=== Industrial history ===
Iron ore was quarried in the area at various times between the 1880s and 1974. Some of the quarries also obtained clay for brick making in the early days and a limestone quarry operated between 1917 and 1943.

The quarries which started first were on the east side of the village and gradually worked their way northwards. They were small-scale workings and it is not clear when they began. However, it is known that they were in operation by 1884. There was also a brick works; closed by 1892. The ore was taken to the railway east of Twywell Station by a cable-worked tramway of an unknown gauge (possibly 4 foot or 2 foot). The quarries reopened in 1906 and used a new tramway with a similar route and a 2 ft 3inch gauge, also cable-worked. The building which housed the stationary steam engine which operated the cable was still visible in 1979. A steam digger was in use by 1923 and at that time a steam locomotive worked in part of the quarry. The locomotive was of German manufacture, possibly provided by Germany as part of the reparations for World War I. However, production ceased in 1923 and did not begin again until 1963. Most of this later quarrying was to the north of the village and the ore was taken away by lorry. At this time it was sent to Hartlepool and Middlesbrough for smelting. The quarries were smoothed over, but iron-ore sand was obtained between 1971 and 1977.

The quarrying to the west and south-west of the village was on a larger scale. The original operating company owned an iron works at Islip and the ore was taken to that works by a 3-foot-gauge steam-operated tramway. Quarrying began in 1907 and continued until 1948. Mechanical diggers were introduced from 1915 onwards, first operated by steam and from 1931 by diesel. Some of the ore was taken to Wellingborough or Corby for smelting and the Islip works was closed in 1942. The workings generally extended to the south west as time went on. The same company operated a limestone quarry between 1917 and 1943, which was at the western end of the quarries. Some of the quarried area was smoothed over and returned to agriculture, particularly close to the village. Some was left as "hills and dales" and planted with larch. The final gullet and the limestone quarry have been left unfilled. The area was designated a site of special scientific interest and is a nature reserve and country park. (See below)

== Notable people ==
Twywell was the birthplace of the bluestocking writer Hester Chapone, née Mulso (1727–1801), whose conduct book Letters on the Improvement of the Mind (1773), addressed to a 15-year-old niece, remained influential and regularly reprinted for over fifty years.

Horace Waller (1833–1896), anti-slavery activist, missionary and cleric, was Rector of the Anglican parish of Twywell from 1874 to 1895.

== Modern Twywell ==
The village is centred along the High Street and The Green. There are nine buildings of special architectural or historic interest in the parish.

The parish church is dedicated to St Nicholas. It forms part of the joint benefice of Cranford with Grafton Underwood and Twywell. The building is Norman but remodelled about 1300.

The 1991 population was 179 in 87 dwellings. There was a butcher, an off-licence and a public house. The village is currently visited by a greengrocer and a mobile library. There is a bus service to Thrapston and Kettering.

Nearby Twywell Hills and Dales Country Park provides attractive countryside walks. Twywell Plantation, a wood belonging to the Woodland Trust, lies to the south and west of the village.
