= List of earls in the reign of King Stephen =

The following individuals were Earls (suo jure or jure uxoris) or Countesses (suo jure) during the reign of Stephen, King of England who reigned from 1135 to 1154.

The period of tenure as Earl or Countess is given after the name and title of each individual, including any period of minority.

King Stephen’s entitlement to the English throne was challenged by his first cousin, Empress Matilda, the daughter of Stephen’s predecessor King Henry I of England. The period of civil war in England from 1135 to 1153 became known as the Anarchy.

Both Stephen and Matilda created new earldoms and invested earls during the Anarchy.

Earl of Arundel

William d'Aubigny, 1st Earl of Arundel, 1st Earl of Lincoln (1138-1176)

Earl of Bedford

Hugh de Beaumont, 1st Earl of Bedford (1137-?)

Earl of Buckingham

Walter Giffard, 2nd Earl of Buckingham (1102-1164)

Earl of Chester (Second Creation)

Ranulf de Gernon, 4th Earl of Chester (1129-1153)

Hugh de Kevelioc, 5th Earl of Chester (1153-1181)

Earl of Cornwall (First Creation Restored)

Alan de Bretagne, 1st Earl of Richmond, Earl of Cornwall (1140-1141)

Earl of Cornwall (Third Creation)

Reginald de Dunstanville, 1st Earl of Cornwall (1141-1175)

Earl of Derby

Robert de Ferrers, 1st Earl of Derby (1138-1139)

Robert de Ferrers, 2nd Earl of Derby (1139-1162)

Earl of Devon

Baldwin de Redvers, 1st Earl of Devon (1141-1175)

Earl of Essex

Geoffrey de Mandeville, 1st Earl of Essex (1139-1144)

Geoffrey de Mandeville, 2nd Earl of Essex (1144-1166)

Earl of Gloucester

Robert, 1st Earl of Gloucester (1122-1147)

William Fitz Robert, 2nd Earl of Gloucester (1147-1183)

Earl of Hereford

Miles de Gloucester, 1st Earl of Hereford (1141-1143)

Roger Fitzmiles, 2nd Earl of Hereford (1125-1155)

Earl of Hertford

Gilbert de Clare, 1st Earl of Hertford (1138-1152)

Roger de Clare, 2nd Earl of Hertford (1152-1173)

Earl of Huntingdon (Huntingdon-Northampton)

David I of Scotland, Earl of Huntingdon-Northampton (1113-1136)

Simon II de Senlis, Earl of Huntingdon-Northampton (1138-1139)

Henry of Scotland, Earl of Huntingdon-Northampton (1139-1141)

Simon II de Senlis, Earl of Huntingdon-Northampton (1141-1153)

Simon III de Senlis, Earl of Huntingdon-Northampton (1153-1157)

Earl of Leicester

Robert de Beaumont, 2nd Earl of Leicester (1118-1168)

Earl of Lincoln (First Creation)

William d'Aubigny, 1st Earl of Arundel, Earl of Lincoln (1143)

Earl of Lincoln (Second Creation)

William de Roumare, Earl of Lincoln (1143-1150)

Earl of Lincoln (Third Creation)

Gilbert de Gant, Earl of Lincoln (1150-1156)

Earl of Norfolk

Hugh Bigod, 1st Earl of Norfolk (1141-1177)

Earl of Northumberland

Henry of Scotland, Earl of Northumberland (1139-1152)

William the Lion of Scotland, Earl of Northumberland (1152-1157)

Earl of Oxford

Aubrey de Vere, 1st Earl of Oxford (1141-1194)

Earl of Pembroke

Gilbert de Clare, 1st Earl of Pembroke (1138-1148)

Richard de Clare, 2nd Earl of Pembroke (1148-1176)

Earl of Richmond

Alan de Bretagne, 1st Earl of Richmond, Earl of Cornwall (1136-1146)

Conan IV, Duke of Brittany, 2nd Earl of Richmond (1146-1166)

Earl of Salisbury

Patrick of Salisbury, 1st Earl of Salisbury (1145-1168)

Earl of Somerset

William de Mohun of Dunster, 1st Earl of Somerset (1141-1155)

Earl of Surrey

William de Warenne, 2nd Earl of Surrey (1088-1101) (1103-1138)

William de Warenne, 3rd Earl of Surrey (1138-1148)

Isabel de Warenne, Countess of Surrey suo jure (1148-1199)

William I, Count of Boulogne, Earl of Surrey jure uxoris (1148-1159)

Earl of Warwick

Henry de Beaumont, 1st Earl of Warwick (1088-1119)

Roger de Beaumont, 2nd Earl of Warwick (1119-1153)

Earl of Wiltshire

Hervey le Breton, Earl of Wiltshire (1139-1141)

Earl of Worcester

Waleran de Beaumont, 1st Earl of Worcester (1138-1166)

Earl of York

William le Gros, 1st Earl of York (1138-1179)

== Sources ==
Davis, R. H. C. (1967) King Stephen, 1135-1154. London: Longmans, Green and Co. Ltd.

Ellis, Geoffrey. (1963) Earldoms in Fee: A Study in Peerage Law and History. London: The Saint Catherine Press, Limited.
