= Leofric, Earl of Mercia =

Earl of Mercia

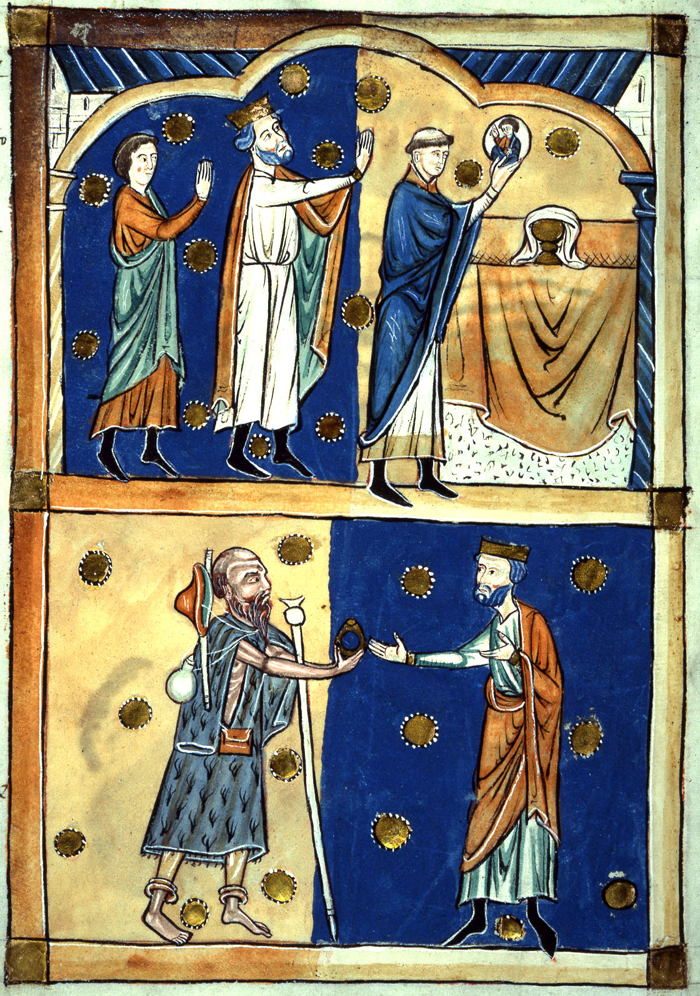
Above: King Edward the Confessor and Earl Leofric of Mercia see the face of Christ appear in the Eucharistic host; below: the return of a ring given to a beggar who was John the Baptist in disguise. From a 13th-century abridgement of Domesday Book

Leofric (died 31 August or 30 September 1057) of Mercia founded monasteries at Coventry and Much Wenlock and was a very powerful earl under King Cnut and his successors. Leofric was the husband of Godgifu (upon whom the Lady Godiva legend is based).

== Life ==
Leofric was the son of Leofwine, Ealdorman of the Hwicce, and had three brothers: Northman, Eadwine (written as Edwin in some 20th-century accounts) and Godwine. He became Earl of Mercia some time before 1032, which made him one of the most powerful men in England.

In his era most earls and kings led on the battlefield. Early in Leofric's reign, the Kingdom of England was ruled by Cnut the Great, a master of delegation. Leofric apparently delegated to his brother Eadwine the command of at least one Mercian army. In 1037 Cnut's son Harold Harefoot won the throne of England against the superior claim of his older half-brother Harthacnut due to greater military support from Leofric and his allies. Leofric continued to be a loyal supporter of Harold Harefoot, to whom he might have been related, during the ongoing succession crisis.

But Leofric had significant threats to his own power and influence. On Mercia's western border with Wales, King Iago ap Idwal of Gwynedd was assassinated in 1039, supposedly by his own men, and his faction friendly to Mercia and England had been decimated. A dangerous new ruler was enthroned, Gruffydd ap Llywelyn. An army under the command of Eadwine son of Leofwine, the brother of Leofric, Earl of Mercia, was sent to thwart Gruffydd's expansionist intentions. But Eadwine and many of his men were surprised and slain at the Battle of Rhyd Y Groes, eliminating the nobles and trained men at arms who made the Earldom of Mercia a formidable regional military power and asset to the King of England. Following a peace treaty with Magnus of Norway around 1040, Harthacnut prepared an invasion force in 1039/40. But when Harthacnut's brother King Harold died at Oxford on 17 March 1040, an envoy from England offered Harthacnut a peaceful path to the English throne.

After Harthacnut died in 1042, Leofric loyally supported his successor Edward the Confessor. In 1051, Edward came under threat at Gloucester from Godwine, Earl of Wessex. Earl Leofric of Mercia and Earl Siward of Northumbria gathered a great army in support of the king. Edward was counselled that battle was inadvisable, as it risked the deaths of important members of the nobility from each faction, which would weaken England's defences and leave it open to its external enemies. On Leofric's advice, the dispute was referred to the Witenagemot, which resulted in Earl Godwin and his family being outlawed for a time.

In 1055 Leofric's son Ælfgar was outlawed, "without any fault", according to some versions of the Anglo-Saxon Chronicle. Ælfgar went on to raise an army in Ireland and Wales and marched on Hereford, where he fought Earl Ralph of Herefordshire, severely damaging the town. The Anglo-Saxon Chronicle notes: "And then when they had done most harm, it was decided to reinstate Earl Ælfgar".

Leofric died at his estate at Kings Bromley in Staffordshire on 30 September 1057, according to the Anglo Saxon Chronicle. The chronicler of Worcester gives the date as 31 August 1057. Both sources agree that he was buried in Coventry at St Mary's Priory and Cathedral. Leofric was succeeded by his son Ælfgar as earl.

== Religious works ==
Leofric and his wife Godgifu (Godiva) were generous benefactors of religious houses. In 1043, for example, he founded and endowed a Benedictine monastery at Coventry. John of Worcester tells us that "He and his wife, the noble Countess Godgifu, a worshipper of God and devout lover of St Mary ever-virgin, built the monastery there from the foundations out of their own patrimony, and endowed it adequately with lands and made it so rich in various ornaments that in no monastery in England might be found the abundance of gold, silver, gems and precious stones that was at that time in its possession."

In the 1050s Leofric and Godgifu appear jointly as benefactors in a document granting land to the monastery of St Mary, Worcester, and the endowment of the minster at Stow St Mary, Lincolnshire. They are commemorated as benefactors of other monasteries as well, at Leominster, Chester, Much Wenlock, and Evesham.

== Family ==
=== Northman ===
Leofric's brother Northman is likely the Northman Miles ("Northman the knight") to whom King Æthelred II granted the village of Twywell in Northamptonshire in 1013. Northman, according to the Chronicle of Crowland Abbey, the reliability of which is disputed by many historians, says he was a retainer (knight) of Eadric Streona, the Earl of Mercia. It adds that Northman was killed on Cnut's orders in 1017, along with Eadric and others. Cnut then "made Leofric ealdorman in place of his brother Northman, and afterwards held him in great affection".

=== Eadwine and Godwine ===
Leofric had at least two other brothers: Eadwine (referred to as Edwin in some texts) led the Mercian army to his death at the Battle of Rhyd Y Groes in 1039 opposing the forces of Gruffydd ap Llywelyn, and Godwine died some time before 1057.

=== Wives ===
Leofric may have married more than once. His most well-known wife was Godgifu (Godiva) who survived him, but may have been a second or later wife. There is some doubt about the date of marriage and it is therefore not clear whether she was the mother of Ælfgar, Leofric's only surviving child and heir.

=== Ælfgifu ===
Leofric may have had some connection by marriage to Ælfgifu of Northampton, the first wife of Cnut. It is thought that this was through his son Aelfgar's marriage to another Ælfgifu some time in the late 1020s. This would explain why he was the chief supporter of her son Harold Harefoot against Harthacnut, Cnut's son by Emma of Normandy.

== Historicity ==
Historians disagree extensively on the character of Leofric. In the legend of Lady Godiva he is depicted as an unfeeling overlord who imposed over-taxation. This might have been conflated with the increase in taxation imposed by Harthacnut. We know that two of Harthacnut's tax-collectors were killed at Worcester by angry locals, for example. The king was so enraged by this that in 1041 he ordered Leofric and other earls to plunder and burn the city, and lay waste to the surrounding area. This command must have been uncomfortable for Leofric, since Worcester was the capital of his own people, the Hwicce.

There is also disagreement over Leofric's reputation as a military leader: some historians believe Leofric to have been weak in this respect, but others say he was a respected and able warrior - even going as far as to give him the title 'Hammer of the Welsh'.

== Visio Leofrici ==
A single prose account of Leofric's life, Visio Leofrici (the Vision of Leofric), which was produced and used by the monastic community at Worcester, survives in MS Corpus Christi College, Cambridge (CCCC) 367, a composite book that appears to have been put together by Archbishop Matthew Parker.

The account is split into four episodes, each of which depicts one of Leofric's miraculous visions. It is quasi-hagiographical, portraying the earl as a saint or holy man. One of these visions has been noted for its similarities to the account of Leofric's vision in Osbert's later account of the life of Edward the Confessor.

== Heraldry and legacy ==
The Mercian Regiment’s double-headed eagle cap badge is derived from the supposed arms of Leofric, though Leofric lived in pre-heraldic times and these attributed arms are therefore unhistorical.

== In popular culture ==
On screen, Leofric was portrayed by Roy Travers in the British silent short Lady Godiva (1928), George Nader in the film Lady Godiva of Coventry (1955), and Tony Steedman in the BBC TV series Hereward the Wake (1965). He also may have inspired the character "Leofric", played by Adrian Bower in the BBC series The Last Kingdom.

== Sources ==
- Baxter, Stephen (2007). The Earls of Mercia: Lordship and Power in Late Anglo-Saxon England. Oxford: Oxford University Press. ISBN 978-0-19-923098-3.

Peerage of England
Vacant Title last held by Eadric Streona	Earl of Mercia c. 1017–1057	Succeeded by Ælfgār
