= List of earls in the reign of Henry II of England =

The following individuals were Earls (suo jure or jure uxoris) or Countesses (suo jure) during the reign of King Henry II of England who reigned from 1154 to 1189.

The period of tenure as Earl or Countess is given after the name and title of each individual, including any period of minority.

Earl of Arundel

William d'Aubigny, 1st Earl of Arundel, 1st Earl of Lincoln (1138–1176)

William d'Aubigny, 2nd Earl of Arundel (1176–1193)

Earl of Buckingham

Walter Giffard, 2nd Earl of Buckingham (1102–1164)

Earl of Buckingham (Second Creation)

Richard de Clare, 2nd Earl of Pembroke, 1st Earl of Buckingham (1164–1176)

Earl of Chester

Hugh de Kevelioc, 5th Earl of Chester (1153–1181)

Ranulf de Blondeville, 6th Earl of Chester (1181–1232)

Earl of Derby

Robert de Ferrers, 2nd Earl of Derby (1139–1162)

William de Ferrers, 3rd Earl of Derby (1162–1190)

Earl of Devon

Baldwin de Redvers, 1st Earl of Devon (1141–1155)

Richard de Redvers, 2nd Earl of Devon (1155–1162)

Baldwin de Redvers, 3rd Earl of Devon (1162–1188)

Richard de Redvers, 4th Earl of Devon (1188–1193)

Earl of Essex

Geoffrey de Mandeville, 2nd Earl of Essex (1144–1166)

William de Mandeville, 3rd Earl of Essex (1166–1189)

Earl of Gloucester

William Fitz Robert, 2nd Earl of Gloucester (1147–1183)

Isabel, Countess of Gloucester suo jure (1183–1189)

John of England, Earl of Gloucester jure uxoris (1189–1199)

Earl of Hereford

Roger Fitzmiles, 2nd Earl of Hereford (1143–1155)

Earl of Hertford

Roger de Clare, 2nd Earl of Hertford (1153–1173)

Richard de Clare, 3rd Earl of Hertford (1173–1217)

Earl of Huntingdon

Simon II de Senlis, Earl of Huntingdon (1153–1157)

Malcolm IV, King of Scotland, Earl of Huntingdon (1157–1165)

William the Lion, King of Scots, Earl of Huntingdon (1166–1173)

David of Scotland, Earl of Huntingdon (1173–1174))

Simon III de Senlis, Earl of Huntingdon (1174–1184)

David of Scotland, Earl of Huntingdon (1185–1219)

Earl of Leicester

Robert de Beaumont, 2nd Earl of Leicester (1118–1168)

Robert de Beaumont, 3rd Earl of Leicester (1168–1190)

Earl of Lincoln

William d'Aubigny, 1st Earl of Arundel, 1st Earl of Lincoln (1143-?)

Earl of Lincoln (Second Creation)

Gilbert de Gant, Earl of Lincoln (1149–1156)

Earl of Norfolk

Hugh Bigod, 1st Earl of Norfolk (1141–1177)

Earl of Northumbria

William the Lion, King of Scots, Earl of Northumbria (1152–1157)

Earl of Oxford

Aubrey de Vere, 1st Earl of Oxford (1141–1194)

Earl of Pembroke

Richard de Clare, 2nd Earl of Pembroke, 1st Earl of Buckingham (1148–1176)

Gilbert de Clare, 3rd Earl of Pembroke (1176–1185)

Isabel de Clare, 4th Countess of Pembroke suo jure (1185–1199)

Earl of Richmond

Conan IV, Duke of Brittany, Earl of Richmond (1138–1171)

Constance, Duchess of Brittany, Countess of Richmond suo jure (1171–1201)

Earl of Salisbury

Patrick of Salisbury, 1st Earl of Salisbury (1149–1168)

William of Salisbury, 2nd Earl of Salisbury (1168–1196)

Earl of Surrey

Isabel de Warenne, Countess of Surrey suo jure (1148–1203)

William I, Count of Boulogne, Earl of Surrey jure uxoris (1153–1159)

Hamelin de Warenne, Earl of Surrey jure uxoris (1164–1202)

Earl of Warwick

William de Beaumont, 3rd Earl of Warwick (1153–1184)

Waleran de Beaumont, 4th Earl of Warwick (1184–1203)

Earl of York

William le Gros, Earl of York (1138–1179)

== Sources ==
Davis, R. H. C. (1967) King Stephen, 1135–1154. London: Longmans, Green and Co. Ltd.

Ellis, Geoffrey. (1963) Earldoms in Fee: A Study in Peerage Law and History. London: The Saint Catherine Press, Limited.
