= Horace Waller (activist) =

English anti-slavery activist, missionary and clergyman

Horace Waller (1833–1896) was an English anti-slavery activist, missionary and clergyman. He was known as a writer on Africa, evangelical Christian, close associate of David Livingstone and others involved in central and east African mission and exploration work, and advocate of British imperial expansion.

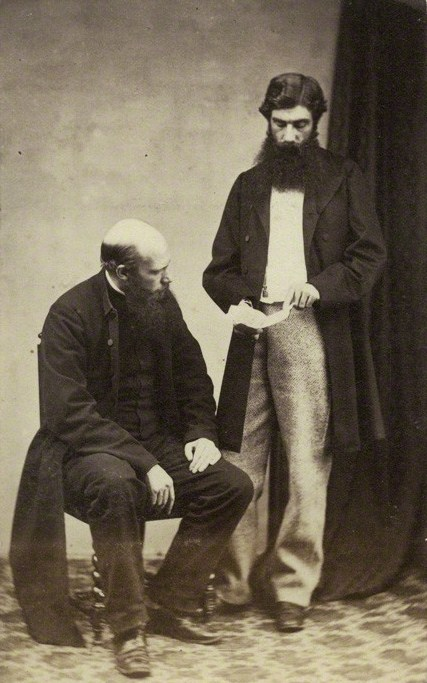
Horace Waller, standing, with Henry Rowley, UMCA missionary, in a photograph of the 1860s

== Life ==
Born in London, Waller was educated under Dr. Wadham at Brook Green. He was for some time in business, in London, as a stockbroker.

With the Universities' Mission to Central Africa (UMCA), Waller went out in 1861 to the regions recently visited by David Livingstone and Sir John Kirk. For a period he worked with Charles Frederick Mackenzie, bishop of Central Africa, and was associated with Livingstone in the Zambesi River and Shire Highlands districts.

Returning to England after the death of Mackenzie in 1862, Waller was in 1867 ordained by the bishop of Rochester to the curacy of St. John, Chatham; in 1870 he moved to the vicarage of Leytonstone, Essex, and in 1874 to the rectory of Twywell, near Thrapston, Northamptonshire, which he resigned in 1895.

Opposition to the slave trade was one of the main objects of Waller's life. In 1867 he attended the British and Foreign Anti-Slavery Society's conference in Paris, and in 1870 he became a member of the committee of the Anti-Slavery Society. In 1871 the House of Commons appointed a committee to investigate the East African slave trade; Waller and Edmund Murge pushed it to recommend Sir John Kirk as permanent political agent at Zanzibar. Ultimately a treaty between the Sultan of Zanzibar and Great Britain declared the slave trade by sea to be illegal.

Waller was on good terms with General Charles George Gordon. He was elected a fellow of the Royal Geographical Society in 1864, died at East Liss, Hampshire, on 22 February 1896, and was buried at Milland church on 26 February.

== Works ==
After Henry Morton Stanley succeeded in discovering Livingstone in Africa, Livingstone's journals were given to Waller for publication. They were issued in two volumes in 1874, as The Last Journals of David Livingstone in Central Africa, from 1865 until his death. By omission, the image projected was of Livingstone as saintly; and the editorial line was that of anti-slavery. Waller's edition of the journals has been called "well-intentioned but unduly reverent". In 1891 Sir Harry Johnston criticised Waller for his lack of interest in other sides of Livingstone's work and papers.

Waller also wrote:

- On some African Entanglements of Great Britain, 1888.
- Nyassaland: Great Britain's Case against Portugal, 1890.
- Ivory, Apes, and Peacocks: an African Contemplation, 1891.
- Heligoland for Zanzibar, or one Island full of Free Men to two full of Slaves, 1893.
- Health Hints for Central Africa, 1893, five editions.
- Slaving and Slavery in our British Protectorates, Nyssaland and Zanzibar, 1894.
- The Case of our Zanzibar Slaves: why not liberate them?, 1896.

== Notes ==
Attribution

This article incorporates text from a publication now in the public domain: Lee, Sidney, ed. (1899). "Waller, Horace". Dictionary of National Biography. Vol. 59. London: Smith, Elder & Co.
