= Battle of Rhyd Y Groes =

Medieval battle

Date	1039
Location	River Severn
Result	Welsh Victory

Belligerents
Kingdom of Gwynedd	Kingdom of England

Commanders and leaders
Gruffydd ap Llywelyn	Eadwine son of Leofwine †

Casualties and losses
Light	"Very many good men"

The Battle of Rhyd Y Groes was fought between the Kingdom of England and the Kingdom of Gwynedd in 1039. The battle resulted in a victory for Gruffydd ap Llywelyn and the death of Eadwine son of Leofwine.

In 1039, Gruffydd seized the throne of Gwynedd after killing King Iago ap Idwal. This alarmed Gruffydd's Anglo-Saxon neighbours who after the death of King Idwal, had lost a friendly ally and been left with a dangerous new ruler on their border. To oppose Gruffydd, an English army was assembled under command of Eadwine son of Leofwine, the brother of Leofric, Earl of Mercia.

Gruffydd led his force to the River Severn and ambushed the English army, killing many including Eadwine. A 1914 Modern English edition of the Anglo-Saxon Chronicle records that "the Welsh slew Edwin, Earl Leofric [of Mercia]'s brother, and Thorkil and Ælfgeat and very many good men with them". This pivotal event was omitted from most copies of the original Anglo-Saxon Chronicle, yet fortunately remains recorded in Abingdon Chronicle II (Cotton Tiberius B. i) at m.xxxix. as "• ⁊ Wealas slogon Eadwine Leofrices broðor eorles • ⁊ þurcil • ⁊ Ælfget • ⁊ swiðe fela godra manna mid heom."^{A}

The battle was a resounding victory for the Welsh, securing Gruffydd's eastern flank against English interference. Earl Leofric had to take a defensive posture in Mercia in the short term. It allowed Gruffydd to increase his kingdom's military and economic power by campaigning south, eventually re-establishing the authority that his father Llywelyn ap Seisyll had held over South Wales. Gruffydd became the first and only ruler to unite the entirety of Wales under his dominion.

== Notes ==
A.The Tironian et (⁊) is a symbol from Tironian notes, an ancient Roman shorthand system created by Cicero's scribe Tiro. ⁊ represents the Latin word et (and). It is used in English for "and" and in Irish/Gaelic for agus ("and"), surviving today on Irish road signs and in other specific contexts, looking like a stylized "7".
