= List of earls in the reign of Edward III of England =

The following individuals were Earls (suo jure or jure uxoris) or Countesses (suo jure) during the reign of King Edward III of England who reigned from 1327 to 1377.

The period of tenure as Earl or Countess is given after the name and title of each individual, including any period of minority.

Earl of Arundel

Richard FitzAlan, 10th Earl of Arundel (1331–1376)

Richard FitzAlan, 11th Earl of Arundel (1376–1397)

Earl of Bedford (Second Creation)

Enguerrand VII, Lord of Coucy, Earl of Bedford (1366–1377)

Earl of Cambridge

William V, Duke of Jülich, Earl of Cambridge (1340–1361)

Earl of Cambridge (Second Creation)

Edmund of Langley, 1st Duke of York, Earl of Cambridge (1362–1402)

Earl of Derby (Second Creation)

Henry of Grosmont, 1st Duke of Lancaster, 1st Earl of Derby, 4th Earl of Lancaster, 4th Earl of Leicester (1337–1361)

Blanche of Lancaster, Countess of Derby suo jure(1361–1368)

John of Gaunt, 2nd Earl of Derby jure uxoris (1359–1368)

Henry IV of England, 3rd Earl of Derby (1368–1399)

Earl of Devon

Hugh de Courtenay, 1st Earl of Devon (1335–1340)

Hugh de Courtenay, 2nd Earl of Devon (1340–1377)

Edward de Courtenay, 3rd Earl of Devon (1377–1419)

Earl of Essex (Third Creation)

John de Bohun, 5th Earl of Hereford, 4th Earl of Essex (1322–1336)

Humphrey de Bohun, 6th Earl of Hereford, 5th Earl of Essex (1336–1361)

Humphrey de Bohun, 7th Earl of Hereford, 6th Earl of Essex, 2nd Earl of Northampton (1361–1373)

Earl of Gloucester (Third Creation)

Hugh de Audley, 1st Earl of Gloucester (1337–1347)

Earl of Hereford (Sixth Creation)

John de Bohun, 5th Earl of Hereford, 4th Earl of Essex (1322–1336)

Humphrey de Bohun, 6th Earl of Hereford, 5th Earl of Essex (1336–1361)

Humphrey de Bohun, 7th Earl of Hereford, 6th Earl of Essex, 2nd Earl of Northampton (1361–1373)

Earl of Huntingdon (Second Creation)

William de Clinton, Earl of Huntingdon (1337–1354)

Earl of Kent (Fifth Creation)

Edmund of Woodstock, 1st Earl of Kent (1321–1330)

Edmund, 2nd Earl of Kent (1331)

John, 3rd Earl of Kent (1331–1352)

Joan of Kent, 4th Countess of Kent suo jure (1352–1360)

Earl of Kent (Sixth Creation)

Thomas Holland, 1st Earl of Kent (1360)

Thomas Holland, 2nd Earl of Kent (1360–1397)

Earl of Lancaster (Second Creation)

Henry, 3rd Earl of Lancaster, 3rd Earl of Leicester (1324–1345)

Henry of Grosmont, 1st Duke of Lancaster, 4th Earl of Lancaster (1345–1361)

Blanche of Lancaster, 5th Countess of Lancastersuo jure(1361–1369)

Earl of Leicester (Second Creation)

Henry, 3rd Earl of Lancaster (1327–1345)

Henry of Grosmont, 1st Duke of Lancaster, 4th Earl of Lancaster (1345–1361)

Blanche of Lancaster, 5th Countess of Leicestersuo jure(1361–1369)

Earl of Lincoln (Fourth Creation)

Alice de Lacy, 4th Countess of Lincoln suo jure (1311–1348)

Earl of Lincoln (Fifth Creation)

Henry of Grosmont, 1st Duke of Lancaster, 1st Earl of Lincoln (1349–1361)

Earl of March

Roger de Mortimer, 1st Earl of March (1328–1330)

Roger de Mortimer, 2nd Earl of March (1354–1360)

Edmund de Mortimer, 3rd Earl of March (1360–1381)

Earl of Norfolk (Third Creation)

Thomas of Brotherton, 1st Earl of Norfolk (1312–1338)

Margaret, Duchess of Norfolk, 2nd Countess of Norfolk suo jure (1338–1399)

Earl of Northampton (Third Creation)

William de Bohun, 1st Earl of Northampton (1337–1360)

Humphrey de Bohun, 7th Earl of Hereford, 2nd Earl of Northampton (1360–1373)

Earl of Oxford

Robert de Vere, 6th Earl of Oxford (1296–1331)

John de Vere, 7th Earl of Oxford (1331–1360)

Thomas de Vere, 8th Earl of Oxford (1360–1371)

Robert de Vere, 9th Earl of Oxford (1371–1388)

Earl of Pembroke (Fourth Creation)

Laurence Hastings, 1st Earl of Pembroke (1339–1348)

John Hastings, 2nd Earl of Pembroke (1348–1375)

John Hastings, 3rd Earl of Pembroke (1375–1389)

Earl of Richmond (Second Creation Restored)

John of Brittany, Earl of Richmond (1306–1334)

John III, Duke of Brittany, 5th Earl of Richmond (1334–1341)

Earl of Richmond (Fourth Creation)

Robert III of Artois, Earl of Richmond (1341–1342)

Earl of Richmond (Fifth Creation)

John of Gaunt, Earl of Richmond (1342–1372)

Earl of Richmond (Second Creation Restored)

John IV of Brittany, Earl of Richmond (1372–1399)

Earl of Salisbury (Second Creation)

William Montagu, 1st Earl of Salisbury (1337–1344)

William Montagu, 2nd Earl of Salisbury (1344–1397)

Earl of Stafford

Ralph de Stafford, 1st Earl of Stafford (1350–1372)

Hugh de Stafford, 2nd Earl of Stafford (1372–1386)

Earl of Suffolk (Second Creation)

Robert de Ufford, 1st Earl of Suffolk (1337–1369)

William de Ufford, 2nd Earl of Suffolk (1369–1382)

Earl of Surrey

John de Warenne, 7th Earl of Surrey (1304–1347)

Richard FitzAlan, 10th Earl of Arundel, 8th Earl of Surrey (1347–1376)

Richard FitzAlan, 11th Earl of Arundel, 9th Earl of Surrey (1376–1397)

Earl of Warwick

Thomas de Beauchamp, 11th Earl of Warwick (1315–1369)

Thomas de Beauchamp, 12th Earl of Warwick (1369–1401)

== Sources ==
Ellis, Geoffrey. (1963) Earldoms in Fee: A Study in Peerage Law and History. London: The Saint Catherine Press, Limited.
