= Twywell Gullet =

Coordinates: 52.388°N 0.614°W

- Site of Special Scientific Interest
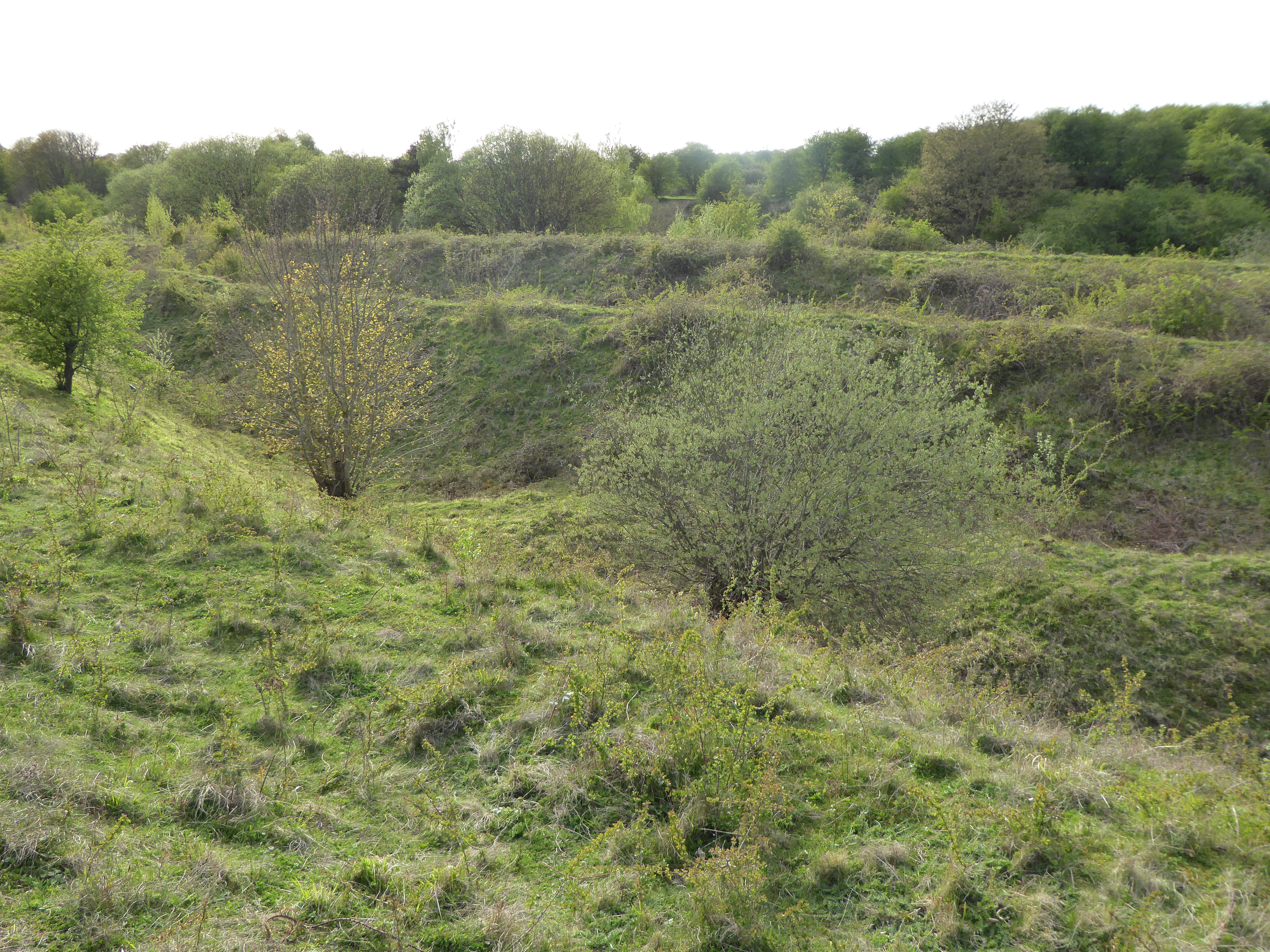
- Location of Twywell Gullet.
- Area of search: Northamptonshire
- Grid reference: SP 944 775
- Interest: Biological
- Area: 17.1 hectares
- Notification date: 1989
- Location map: Magic Map

Twywell Gullet is a 17.1-hectare (42-acre) biological Site of Special Scientific Interest east of Kettering in Northamptonshire. It is part of the 54.6 hectare Twywell Hills and Dales nature reserve, which is managed by a partnership of the Woodland Trust and the Rockingham Forest Trust. The site is in turn a small part of the former royal hunting Rockingham Forest.

Twywell Gullet is a former ironstone quarry which has deep cuttings with steeply sloping banks. It has species-rich limestone grassland on the slopes and ponds and scrub in the bottoms. There are a number of uncommon ground nesting bees and wasps, and beetles include the nationally rare ruddy darter. There is a large pond which has a large reedbed and many great crested newts.

Footpaths go through the site but there is no access to some steeply sloping areas.
