= Ælfric of Hampshire =

Ealdorman of Hampshire, c. 982 to 1016

Ælfric was the Ealdorman of Hampshire from c. 982 to 1016.

Ælfric succeeded Ealdorman Æthelmær to the county of Hampshire and possibly Wiltshire in about 982. Ælfric was among the leading advisers of King Æthelred and was described by the Anglo-Saxon Chronicle as 'one of those in whom the king trusted most'; his influence is perhaps suggested in 991 when the king followed the counsel given by Ælfric, as well as Æthelweard and Sigeric, to pay the Danes for peace. In 992, Ælfric defected to a Danish fleet with which he was in conflict. Despite the capture of his defecting ship, he escaped from his enemy. His family was later punished for Ælfric's actions, as King Æthelred had his son Ælfgar blinded the year after, in 993.

Ælfric was at some point reconciled with Æthelred, since the Anglo-Saxon Chronicle states that he had fought for the English in 1016, but in 1003, another incident was recorded in which he supposedly pretended to be sick in order to avoid leading an army from Wiltshire and Hampshire against Sweyn Forkbeard, who was allowed to pillage Wilton. Ælfric died in the Battle of Assandun on 18 October 1016 fighting for Edmund Ironside.

In a charter from 993, Ælfric was censured for buying the abbacy of Abingdon for his brother Eadwine and encouraging the king to alienate the abbey's lands to laymen, among whom his son Ælfgar should probably be numbered.

== See also ==
- Sweyn Forkbeard
- History of Anglo-Saxon England
- History of Denmark
- Vikings in England
