= Eadwine of Abingdon =

Abbot of Abingdon

Eadwine was Abbot of Abingdon.

Eadwine was the brother of Ealdorman Ælfric of Hampshire, who purchased the abbacy for him in 985; he Either died in 990 Or 1010 at the battle of ringmere
