= Leofwine, Ealdorman of the Hwicce =

Ealdorman of the Hwicce

Leofwine (died in or after 1023) was appointed Ealdorman of the Hwicce by King Æthelred the Unready of England in 994. The territory of the Hwicce was a kingdom in the Western Midlands in the early Anglo-Saxon period, which soon became a subdivision of Mercia. Leofwine was the son of Ælfwine, who is otherwise unknown, but the family appears to have originated in the East Midlands. Leofwine and his sons were considered by the See of Worcester as spoliators who seized church land, but East Midlands religious establishments regarded them as benefactors.

Under Æthelred, Leofwine's sphere of office was in the Hwicce areas of Worcestershire and Gloucestershire, but these counties were given to Danes by King Cnut soon after he gained the throne in 1016. However, Leofwine kept his rank and may have been appointed Ealdorman of Mercia in 1017 in succession to Eadric Streona, but Leofwine's eldest son Northman was murdered on Cnut's orders in the same year. Leofwine is last recorded in surviving charters in 1023, when he was named as witness, and probably died soon afterwards. His son Leofric was Earl of Mercia by 1032. Leofwine had two other sons, Edwine, who died at the Battle of Rhyd-y-groes in 1039, and Godwine.
