= Earl of Mercia =

Ancient noble title in England

Earl of Mercia was a title in the late Anglo-Saxon, Anglo-Danish, and early Anglo-Norman period in England. During this period the earldom covered the lands of the old Kingdom of Mercia in the English Midlands. First governed by ealdormen under the kings of Wessex in the 10th century, it became an earldom in the Anglo-Danish period. During the time of King Edward the earldom was held by Leofric and his family, who were political rivals to the House of Godwine. Following the Conquest in 1066 Edwin was confirmed as earl by King William. However he was implicated in the rebellion of 1071 and was dispossessed. Following the death of Edwin the earldom was broken up, the power and regional jurisdiction of the earl passing to the newly formed earldoms of Chester and later Shrewsbury.

== Earldormen and Earls of Mercia ==
=== Ealdormen ===
- Ælfhere (950s–983)
- Ælfric Cild (983–985)
- Eadric Streona (1007–1017)

=== Earls ===
- Leofric (c. 1030–1057)
- Ælfgar (1057–c. 1062)
- Edwin (c. 1032–1071)

== See also ==
- List of monarchs of Mercia
- Earl of March
- Welsh Marches
- Marcher Lords
- Council of the Marches
