= Philip Simonsson =

Norwegian aristocrat (c.1185–1217)

Philip Simonsson (Old Norse: Filippus Símonsson) (ca. 1185–1217), also known as Philip of the Crozier-men, was a Norwegian aristocrat and from 1207 to 1217 was the Bagler party pretender to the throne of Norway during the civil war era in Norway.

== Background ==
Philip was the son of Simon Kåresson (d. 1190) and Margrét Arnadóttir. Símon Kåresson had been a prominent opponent of King Sverre, who fought with the unsuccessful pretender Jon Kuvlung in the 1180s and was killed launching a new unsuccessful rising against Sverre in 1190. Philip was the grandson of Ingrid Ragnvaldsdotter, the dowager queen of Norway. Philip's mother Margrét was the half-sister of King Inge I of Norway and full sister of Nikolás Arnason, bishop of Oslo and another prominent opponent of King Sverre and the Birkebeiner.

In 1196, Bishop Nikolas and other opponents of King Sverre raised the Bagler party, with Inge Magnusson as their candidate, with the strong support of the Roman Catholic Church. The Bagler fought Sverre until his death in 1202, neither side being able to achieve victory. Sverre was succeeded by his son, Haakon III of Norway, who reconciled himself with the church. Deprived of its main support, the Bagler party dissolved, and Inge Magnusson was killed.

== Philip as earl ==
In 1204, King Haakon III died unexpectedly, and the Birkebeiner elected an infant King Guttorm, with real power in the hands of earl Haakon the Crazy. In response to this, the old Bagler united their army again, with the support of the King Valdemar II of Denmark. Bishop Nikolas attempted to have his nephew, Philip, elected king. The main body of the Bagler objected to this, as Philip was not of Norwegian royal lineage. Instead, Erling Steinvegg, a putative son of King Magnus V of Norway was made their candidate and Philip was given the title of earl, the highest rank below that of king.

Philip Simonson actually numbered King Harald I of Norway, the eponymous king of the Fairhair dynasty, among his ancestors, through his mother Margaret, whose mother descended from the Swedish Stenkil dynasty. According to Norse legends, their ancestor Inge I of Sweden's grandmother Estrid Njalsdottir, descended from a daughter of King Harald. This descent was not fully sufficient for succession, as Norwegians had tended to require male-line descent from their royal dynasty, and claimants with even a close cognatic lineage to a recent king of Norway (such as maternal grandsons) had been exceptions and not fully approved as dynastic. Philip's Birkebeiner rival King Inge II (successor of Guttorm Sigurdsson, chosen in 1204) had severe difficulties because he was only a maternal grandson of King Sigurd II.

In 1204, King Valdemar II of Denmark came to Norway accompanied by the Bagler army. Erling Steinvegg was declared to be king and Philip Simonsson to be earl. This action marked the start of the second Bagler war. The Bagler rapidly gained control of the Oslofjord-area (Viken), while the Birkebeiner held control of the Trøndelag-region around Nidaros (Trondheim). Western Norway with the city of Bergen changed hands several times.

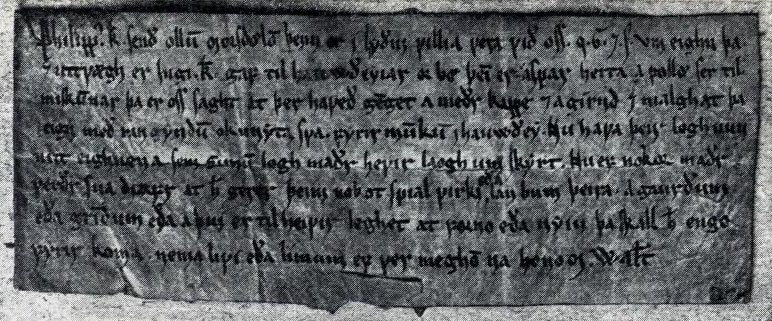
Royal letter from Philip. This is the earliest preserved Norwegian royal letter

== Philip as king ==
In January 1207, the Bagler candidate Erling Steinvegg died, leaving two infant sons. The Bagler first considered which son to take as their new king, but Bishop Nikolas now relaunched Philip's candidature for the title of king. He achieved the support of the free farmers against the Bagler military leaders, and Philip was made the new Bagler candidate.

Philip continued the war against the Birkebeiner, capturing Sverresborg castle in Bergen in 1207, but abandoning it and later enduring a successful Birkebeiner-raid on his own stronghold in Tønsberg later the same year. In 1208, with no side looking able to achieve victory, Bishop Nikolas and the other bishops managed to broker a peace deal between Bagler and Birkebeiner. The settlement was reach at Kvitsøy in Rogaland during the autumn of 1208. King Inge II of Norway recognized Philip's rule over the eastern third of the country, in return for Philip giving up the title of king and recognizing Inge as his overlord. To seal the agreement, Philip was to marry King Sverre's daughter, Kristín Sverrisdóttir.

For the rest of his life, Philip ruled eastern Norway. He married Kristín in 1209. She later died giving birth to their first child who also died soon after. Philip never produced another heir. In April 1217, King Inge died. Philip attempted to renegotiate the peace deal, demanding to divide the kingdom half-and-half with the Birkebeiner. But the same autumn, Philip fell ill and died. The next year, the new Birkebeiner candidate was also recognized by the Bagler as King Haakon IV of Norway, bringing the division of the kingdom to an end.

== Historic context ==
The Norwegian civil war era (Norwegian: borgerkrigstiden) extended over a 110-year period from 1130 to 1240. During this period, it was usual that several royal sons fought against each other over power in Norway. During this period there were several interlocked conflicts of varying scale and intensity. The background for these conflicts were the unclear Norwegian succession laws, social conditions and the struggle between Church and King. There were then two main parties, firstly known by varying names or no names at all, but finally condensed into parties of Bagler and Birkebeiner. The rallying point regularly was a royal son, who was set up as the head figure of the party in question, to oppose the rule of king from the contesting party.

== Sources ==
The main source to the life and reign of Philip is the Bagler sagas. The oldest Norwegian royal letter to have been preserved was issued by Philip.

== Other sources ==
- Finn Hødnebø & Hallvard Magerøy (eds.); translator Gunnar Pedersen; (1979). Soga om baglarar og birkebeinar (Noregs kongesoger 3). Det Norske Samlaget, Oslo. ISBN 82-521-0891-1 Norwegian

Preceded by Erling Steinvegg	Bagler pretender to the Norwegian throne 1207–1217	Succeeded by Håkon (King of Norway)
