= Battle of Ilevollene =

1180 battle in Norway

- Part of Civil war era in Norway
Date	27 May 1180
Location	Ilevollene at Ila west for Nidaros, now known as Trondheim
Result	Birkebeiner victory

Belligerents
Birkebeiners	Heklungers

Commanders and leaders
Sverre Sigurdsson	Magnus V of Norway

Units involved
Unknown, thousands	Unknown, reportedly from all over Western and Southern Norway

Casualties and losses
Unknown, but significant, may have been several hundred killed and wounded	Unknown, but very large. Hundreds, if not over a thousand, died

The Battle of Ilevollene on 27 May 1180 was a battle between king Sverre Sigurdsson and king Magnus Erlingsson taking place at Ila in modern day Trondheim. The battle ended up as a huge victory for king Sverre.

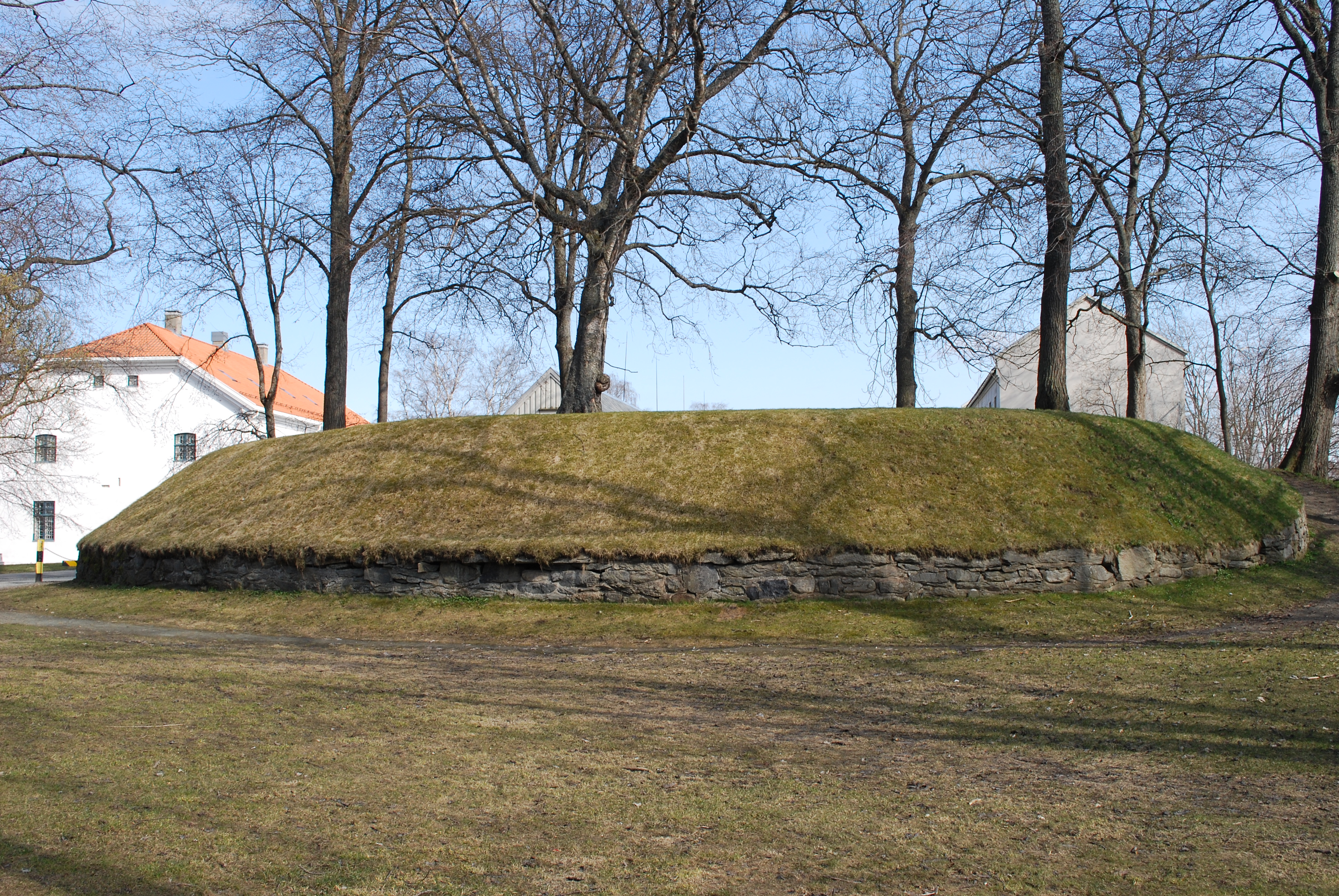
Ilevollen, remaining remains of the palisade structure and city wall at Ila. Credit: Cato Edvardsen (2009)

After the birkebeiners won the Battle of Kalvskinnet in June 1179 they stayed in Nidaros. A raid in Bergen was done shortly after when they heard that Magnus Erlingsson had traveled to Viken for the summer in order to be able to keep possession of the purchase in Oslofjord until the autumn. What happened there is not known, but there are many indications that the westerners were hostile towards the peace breakers from northern areas. Sverre wintered on Nidaros until the spring of 1180, when Magnus Erlingsson returned to Western Norway.

After offering leases in Western and Southern Norway from the east of Lindesnes to Møre og Romsdal in the north, Magnus Erlingsson went with a powerful army to the Trondheimsfjord and stopped first at Byneset at Nidaros with the fleet. Sverre was informed of this army's arrival and sent out a force which ambushed parts of the army at Byneset before they quickly retreated. The assault at Byneset and Sverre Sigurdsson's mobilization of Leidang men in Trøndelag must have prevented Magnus from continuing towards the city. Instead, he moored the raft at Munkholmen just outside Nidaros.

Sverre started negotiations with Magnus Erlingsson to buy time to prepare and strengthen the defenses. He had a wooden castle at Ila and a palisade across the estate between Trondheimsfjorden and Nidelven. Magnus Erlingsson was aware of Sverre's strength. With a strong army of landlords and townsmen, an attack on the city could not take place without great difficulty. When Sverre Sigurdsson heard that the two armies were to meet for a battle at Ila, Magnus agreed. Ila was a strip of land between the Nidelven and the Trondheimsfjord. Sverre had his forces in a wooden castle located there. It was built by Archbishop Øystein Erlendsson a long time ago. Ila was quite narrow with a width of just under 200 metres.
