= Sigurd Markusfostre =

Pretender to the Norwegian throne

Sigurd Sigurdsson Markusfostre (ca. 1155 – 29 September 1163) was a pretender and rival king during the Civil war era in Norway.

== Background ==
Sigurd Sigurdsson was reportedly a bastard son of King Sigurd II of Norway. He must have been born some time before 1155, when his father was killed in a battle with his half-brother King Inge I of Norway. Sigurd was fostered by Markus of Skog apparently in Hedmark (in the area of the present-day Ringsaker Municipality), due to which his nickname was Markusfostered.

== Career ==
When King Haakon II of Norway died in 1162, his supporters named his half-brother Sigurd, to be their candidate for king. However, Sigurd Sigurdsson never succeeded in winning wide recognition or support. In 1163, Sigurd and his foster-father were captured by supporters of Jarl Erling Skakke and Magnus V of Norway, who killed them in Bergen on 29 September 1163.

Øystein Møyla, a son of King Eystein II of Norway, would be his successor as candidate for king by the Birkebeiner party. The Birkebeiner were formed in 1174 around Øystein Møyla, who was proclaimed to be king at the Øretinget Thing by the mouth of the river Nidelva in Trondheim during 1176.

== Historic context ==
The Civil war era in Norway extended over a 110-year period. It started with the death of King Sigurd I of Norway in 1130 and ended with the death of Duke Skule Baardsson in 1240. During this period there were several interlocked conflicts of varying scale and intensity. The background for these conflicts were the unclear Norwegian succession laws, social conditions and the struggle between Church and King. There were then two main parties, firstly known by varying names or no names at all, but finally condensed into parties of Bagler and Birkebeiner. The rallying point regularly was a royal son, who was set up as the head figure of the party in question, to oppose the rule of king from the contesting party.

== Other sources ==
- Kristjánsdóttir, Bergljót S., ed. (2008). The Saga of the People of Laxardal and Bolli Bollason's Tale. Translated by Kunz, Keneva. Illustrations by Leifur Eiricksson. Penguin Classics. ISBN 9780140447750.
