= Nicholas Arnesson =

Norwegian bishop and nobleman (ca. 1150-1225)

Nicholas Arnesson (Old Norse: Nikolás Árnason) (ca. 1150 – 7 November 1225) was a Norwegian bishop and nobleman during the Norwegian civil war era. He was a leader in the opposition against King Sverre of Norway and founder of the Bagler party. He is a chief antagonist in Sverris saga. and also appeared in The Pretenders, an historic drama written by Henrik Ibsen in 1863.

== Background ==
Nicholas was the son of Ingrid Ragnvaldsdotter, the dowager queen of Norway and her fourth husband Arne Ivarsson of Stårheim (Árni Ívarsson). Nicholas was a half-brother of King Inge I of Norway. Nicholas supported King Magnus V of Norway in the civil war against King Sverre. He fought on Magnus' side in the Battle of Ilevollene in 1180, just outside Nidaros, and appeared the following year as his spokesman in negotiations with King Sverre. The conflict ended with Magnus' death in 1184 and Sverre as sole king of Norway.

== Career ==
Nicholas was elected Bishop of Oslo, according to the saga because King Sverre was convinced by Queen Margaret, who was Nicholas' second cousin. Nicholas was Bishop of Oslo for 35 years, from 1190 until his death in 1225. According to Sverris saga he was first made Bishop of Stavanger and then transferred to Oslo, but this is not supported by contemporary documents and is probably an attempt to discredit Nicholas. At this time relations between church and king were becoming increasingly bad with the archbishop forced into exile.

King Sverre accused Nicholas of treason and threatened severe punishment. Nicholas submitted and on 29 June 1194, together with the other bishops, he crowned Sverre as King of Norway. Later an uprising by former supporter of King Magnus ended in failure. Sverre charged Nicholas with treason, claiming he had been implicated. Nicholas was banned and joined the exiled archbishop Erik Ivarsson (Eirik Ivarsson), Bishop of Stavanger in Denmark. Erik had fled to the cathedral city of Lund in Scania, where the Danish archbishop had his seat.

During 1196, Nicholas was one of the leaders of the Bagler party together with the nobleman Reidar the Messenger from Viken and Sigurd Jarlsson, a bastard son of Erling Skakke. Archbishop Erik Ivarsson also gave his support. The Bagler chose Inge Magnusson, who was claimed to be the illegitimate son of King Magnus V, as their candidate for king. The Baglers established themselves in the Viken area, which was both Nicholas' bishopric and King Magnus' old power base. On 18 June 1199 the two fleets met at the naval Battle of Strindafjord. Here Sverre won a crushing victory and the surviving Baglers fled.

Although they were at times driven out, Viken remained loyal to the Bagler cause to the end of the civil war. After the defeat of the Bagler in the Battle of Strindafjord, Nicholas had to flee to Denmark and seems to have stayed there until Sverre's death and reconciliation between parties 1202.

== Historic context ==
From 1130 until 1240, there were several interlocked civil wars of varying scale and intensity. The background for these conflicts were the unclear Norwegian succession laws, social conditions and the struggle between Church and King. The goal of the warring parties was always to put their candidate on the throne. The rallying point regularly was a royal son, who was set up as the head figure of the party in question, to oppose the rule of king from the contesting party.

== Other sources ==
- Krag, Claus Norges største middelalderkonge (Aschehoug. Oslo: 2005)
- Holmsen, Andreas Norges historie. Fra de eldste tider til 1660 (Universitetsforlaget, Oslo: 1939)
