= The Last King =

2016 Norwegian historical drama film

- Birkebeinerne
- Directed by: Nils Gaup
- Screenplay by: Ravn Lanesskog
- Produced by: Per Henry Borch; Mary Callery; Malene Ehlers; Peter Garde; Finn Gjerdrum; Eszter Gyárfás; Lone Korslund; Stein B. Kvae; Jackie Larkin; Lesley McKimm; Viktória Petrányi; Erik Poppe; Julius Solheim; Kaare Storemyr; Judit Sós; Henrik Zein
- Starring: Jakob Oftebro; Kristofer Hivju; Thorbjørn Harr; Pål Sverre Valheim Hagen; Ane Ulmoen Øverli
- Cinematography: Peter Mokrosinski
- Edited by: Christoffer Heie; Tomas Täng
- Music by: Gaute Storaas
- Production companies: Eurimages; Irish Film Board; Nordisk Film Production; Paradox Films; Newgrange Pictures; Proton Cinema (co-production)
- Distributed by: Magnolia Pictures; Nordisk Film Distribusjon; StudioCanal; At Entertainment; Koch Media
- Release date: 12 February 2016
- Running time: 93 minutes
- Countries: Norway; Denmark; Sweden; Ireland; Hungary
- Languages: Norwegian; Danish; Swedish

The Last King (Norwegian: Birkebeinerne) is a 2016 Norwegian historical drama, directed by Nils Gaup. The story, inspired by true events, centers on the efforts of the Birkebeiner loyalists to protect the infant, Haakon Haakonsson, the heir to the Norwegian throne after the death of his father, King Haakon Sverresson. The film is set during the civil war era in Norway during the 13th-century.

== Synopsis ==
In Norway 1204, Birkebeiners and king Haakon Sverresson possess the throne in Nidaros. They are threatened by Baglers, a rebel faction who have taken power in Eastern Norway, with help from Denmark.

In Nidaros, after having sex, Gisle (Pal Sverre Valheim Hagan), a corrupt aristocrat and Bagler supporter, conspires with the former queen Margaret (Lia Boysen) to have king Haakon (Benjamin Helstad) murdered, promising to return her to power as queen. Margaret's daughter Kristin overhears this and confronts her, but her mother claims that exposing the plot would mean certain death for them, scaring Kristin into secrecy.

Margaret poisons Haakon and departs Norway for her native Sweden. Before he dies, however, Haakon reveals he has a son with a woman named Inga, and has sent Torstein (Kristofer Hivju) and Skervald (Jakob Oftebro), two Birkebeiner agents, to find him. Gisle later frames his brother Inge and plans to marry Kristin.

After initially securing Inga and her son Haakon, Skervald returns home, only to be seized by Baglers led by the knight Orm (Nikolaj Lie Kaas), having been led there by a Birkebeiner traitor. After Skervald reluctantly reveals Haakon's location, Orm murder his wife and infant child, though he narrowly escapes.

Skervald arrives at the Birkebeiner camp to warn them of the impending attack. After he reveals that he told the Baglers their location, however, the fort leader plans to execute Skervald. Distracted by this, the Birkebeiner guards are ambushed and overwhelmed by the Baglers, though this allows Skervald to break free with Torstein, Inga and Haakon.

After numerous attacks by Baglers, Torstein and Skervald arrive at a village and rally the locals for a final fight. In the battle, Skervald protects Inga and Haakon, while managing to kill Orm, though he is fatally wounded in the process.

On the day of Gisle's planned wedding to Kristin, Torstein and the other Birkebeiners enter Nidaros and free Inge.

Gisle is subsequently seized and taken away, presumably to be executed. Haakon is officially secured as the next king, and a text explains that "during his reign, there was peace in Norway".

== Cast ==
- Jakob Oftebro as Skjervald
- Kristofer Hivju as Torstein
- Pål Sverre Valheim Hagen as Gisle (based on Haakon the Crazy)
- Thorbjørn Harr as Inge jarl
- Benjamin Helstad as Haakon III of Norway
- Stig Henrik Hoff as Erlend
- Nikolaj Lie Kaas as Orm the Knight
- Ane Ulimoen Øverli as Inga of Varteig
- Thea Sofie Loch Næss as Kristina Sverresdotter
- Anders Dahlberg as Aslak
- Elg Elgesem as Frikk
- Torkel Dommersnes Soldal
- Adam Nemet as Gisle's henchman
- Søren Pilmark as The Bishop
- Lia Boysen as Margareta Eriksdotter

== Reception ==
On review aggregator website Rotten Tomatoes, the film holds an approval rating of 89% based on 9 reviews.

== Historical accuracy ==
The historical accuracy of the film was heavily critiqued by professor Hans Jacob Orning on the University of Oslo's official history site for a number of points such as open practice of paganism in the 13th century, the black and white portrayal of the Birkebeiner and Bagler factions, Gisle's (standing in for Haakon the Crazy) support of the Baglers and Haakon Haakonsson's supposedly more democratic rule. While the film's portrayal of the Bagler-faction as being backed by Denmark is true, it leaves out that the Birkebeiner had similar support from Sweden. Inge Bårdsson is shown as supporting Haakon Haakonsson's claim, while in reality he did not view him as legitimate. At one point the baby Haakon Haakonsson is given a potato, despite the potato being introduced in the mid 18th century in Norway. During a promotional interview on Skavlan, lead actor Jakob Oftebro stated the film was about the Protestant Birkebeiner fighting Catholic Bagler, misplacing the Reformation by about 300 years, which led to widespread ridicule and criticism of Skavlan for not pointing out what was viewed as a blatant inaccuracy.

The film also depicts Margareta Eriksdotter as poisoning Haakon in a conspiracy to become queen again with Gisle. In reality, Margaret was suspected of killing the king, but was never proven to have done so.

Also, while the film portrays Haakon as having great respect for Margaret, evidence suggests the two actually had a difficult relationship. Margaret attempted to leave Norway with her daughter Kristin Sverrsedotter, but Haakon had his men retrieve Kristin. It is possible that Margaret (if responsible) poisoned the king out of vengeful spite rather than a conspiracy.

The film shows them going on two identical long skis. During the period as told by Sigrid Undset in Kristin Lavransdatter and The Master of Hestviken people used one long ski and one short ski. The short ski was used for traction going uphill. Although Undset was a novelist, she had expert knowledge of details of this period.

== See also ==
- Birkebeiner
- Bagler
