= Erling Steinvegg =

Candidate for the Norwegian throne (died 1207)

Erling Magnusson Steinvegg or Erlingr Magnússon Steinveggr (died March 1207) was the candidate of the Bagler for the Norwegian throne from 1204 until his death. His candidacy resulted in the second Bagler War which lasted until 1208, when the question of the Norwegian succession was temporarily settled.

== Biography ==
Erling Magnusson was claimed to be an illegitimate son of King Magnus Erlingsson. He also claimed some years earlier to have been arrested by Swedish King Knut Eriksson and put in the stone tower on the island of Visingsö in Lake Vättern. From there he would have escaped, and for this reason he later carried the nickname Steinvegg meaning Stonewall.

At the death of King Håkon III of Norway in January 1204, no heirs were known. Håkon was therefore succeeded by his 4-year-old nephew Guttorm Sigurdsson who subsequently died in August 1204. Members of the Bagler party became convinced that Erling Steinvegg was a son of King Magnus V of Norway and made him a candidate for the Norwegian throne. King Valdemar II of Denmark attempted to influence the outcome of the Norwegian succession by leading a Danish fleet of over 300 ships and army to Viken in support of Erling as pretender to the Norwegian throne. Erling Steinvegg succeeded at the iron test to show that he was of royal descent. To prove his ancestry, Erling undertook the ordeal in the presence King Valdemar II of Denmark and subsequently received 35 ships as a gift of him. Afterwards, Erling was taken by the king to Haugating in Tønsberg and declared to be king of Norway.

When Erling died in 1207, he left two infant sons, Sigurd and his brother. They were passed over by the Bagler, in favour of Philip Simonsson, who became the new Bagler candidate. Neither Erling Steinvegg nor later his son Sigurd Ribbung would manage to prevail over the Birkebeiner, the ultimate victors in the power struggle for Norway. The Bagler never achieved control of all of Norway, but rather established their rule in Viken in the district surrounding Oslofjord in southeastern Norway after 1204. Erling Steinvegg died in March 1207. Philip Simonsson was made his successor as the next pretender by the Bagler.

== Historic context ==
In the Norwegian civil war era it was usual that several royal sons fought against each other over power in Norway. The civil war period of Norwegian history lasted from 1130 to 1240. During this period there were several interlocked conflicts of varying scale and intensity. The background for these conflicts were the unclear Norwegian succession laws, social conditions and the struggle between Church and King. There were then two main parties, firstly known by varying names or no names at all, but finally condensed into parties of Bagler and Birkebeiner. The rallying point regularly was a royal son, who was set up as the head figure of the party in question, to oppose the rule of king from the contesting party.

== Sources ==
The main source of information regarding the lives and rebellion of Erling Magnusson Steinvegg and his son Sigurd Ribbung is Sturla Þórðarson's Saga of Håkon Håkonsson which was written in the 1260s.

== Other sources ==
- Helle, Knut Under kirke og kongemakt, 1130-1350 (Oslo: 1995)
- Holmsen, Andreas Norges historie, fra de eldste tider til 1660 (Oslo: 1961)
- Gjerset, Knut History of the Norwegian People (MacMillan Company, Volumes I & II, 1915)

Preceded by Inge Magnusson	Bagler pretender to the Norwegian throne 1204–1207	Succeeded by Philip Simonsson
