= Inge of Norway =

Inge of Norway may refer to:

- Inge I of Norway
- Inge II of Norway
- Inge Magnusson
