= Birkebeiner =

Norwegian political faction during the Civil War era, active from 1174 to the 1210s

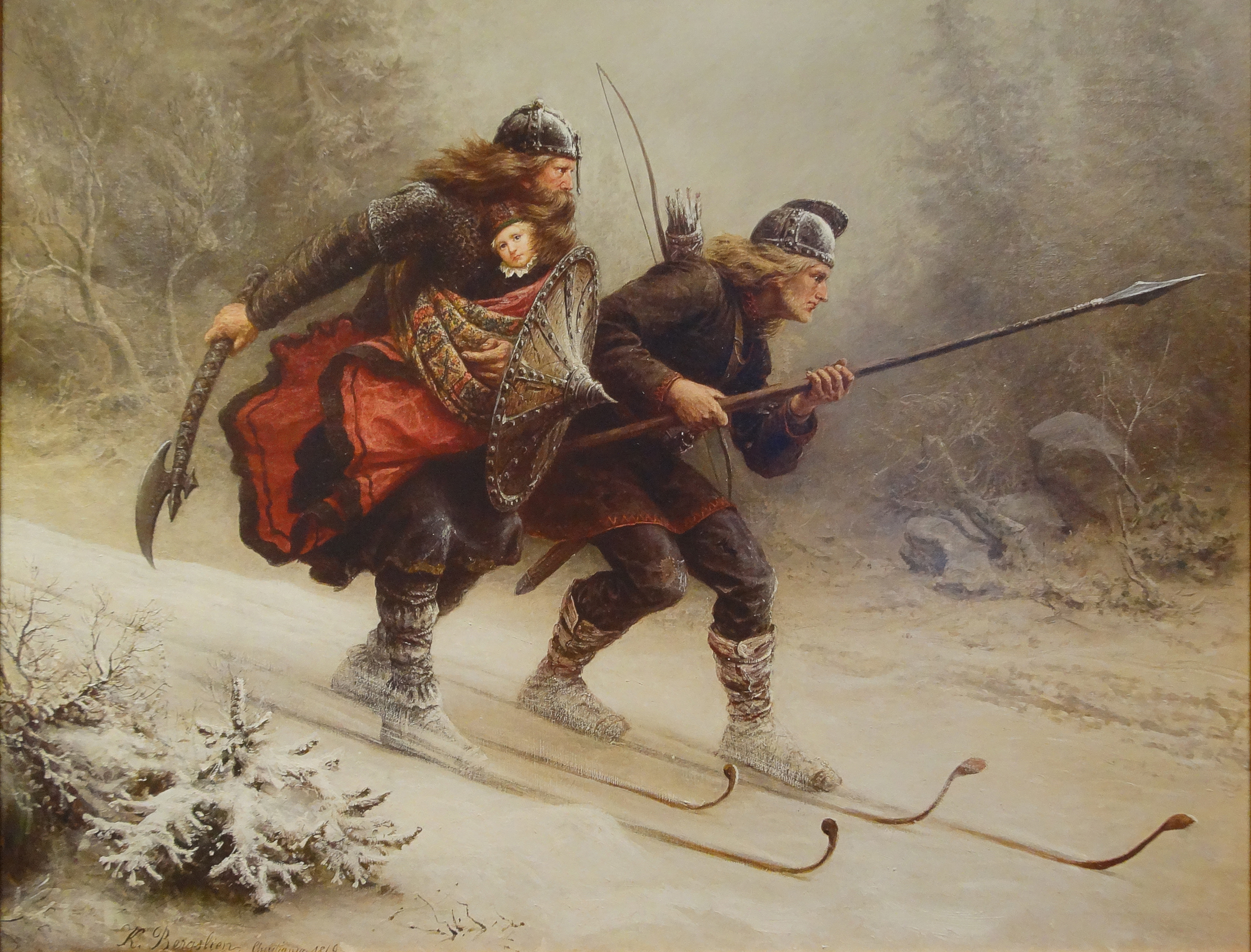
Skiing Birchlegs Crossing the Mountain with the Royal Child, by Knud Bergslien. Painting located at Holmenkollen Ski Museum, Oslo, Norway.

The Birkebeiner, Birkebeinar or Birkebein Party (Old Norse: Birkibeinar; Norwegian: Birkebeinarane (nynorsk) or Birkebeinerne (bokmål)) were a political and rebel group in the Civil War period in Norway, formed in 1174 around Eystein Meyla, a pretender to the throne. The name has its origins in propaganda from the established party that the rebels were so poor that they wrapped their legs with birch bark. Although originally a pejorative, the opposition adopted the Birkebeiner name for themselves, and continued using it after they came to power in 1184.

The Birkebeiner are celebrated for two of them having skied with the one-year-old Haakon Haakonsson, an heir to the Norwegian throne, from Lillehammer through Østerdalen to Trondheim, a long and perilous journey through mountains and forests. In modern Norway, their feat is commemorated through the Birkebeinerrennet cross-country ski race, the Birkebeinerrittet mountain bike race, and the Birkebeinerløpet cross-country run.

== History ==
=== Background ===
During the period of the Norwegian Civil War (borgerkrigstiden) between 1130 and 1240, several interlocked conflicts arose, of varying scale and intensity. The background for these conflicts was unclear Norwegian succession laws, social conditions and the struggle between Church and King. In the 1170s, two rival parties emerged: the establishment faction, later known as Bagler, and the rebel Birkebeiner. The rallying point was regularly a royal son, who was set up as the figurehead of the party in question, to oppose the rule of the king from the contesting party.

Although weak in the beginning, the Birkebeiner had the upper hand for most of the conflict's duration.

=== Formation and name ===
The Birkebein party formed in 1174 out of earlier groups with the original goal of deposing king Magnus V of Norway (Magnus Erlingsson) and his father Erling Skakke, Earl of Vestlandet, in favor of Eystein Meyla. From a socio-historical perspective, scholars have interpreted the party as the result of the rapid increase in landless markamenn ('border men'), who settled along the Swedish border and made their living by pillaging the rich old settlements. It was this lawless population that became the basis of the Birkebeiner.

Their leadership came from Trøndelag, a region where the social tensions were not as marked, and their motive was rather to stop the transition of power from Trøndelag to Viken and Vestlandet. The powerful Trønder families were being left behind by their peers in the south, who had acquired a strong leader in Erling Skakke in the mid-12th century. In the early 1160s, Erling had taken control of Viken and the bishopric of Nidaros and had subsequently made his underage son Magnus the king of Norway.

The faction that was behind the rule of Magnus and Erling was called by several names, ultimately Bagler. They dubbed their opponents "Birkebeiner"—'birch legs'—as an insult suggesting they were so poor, they wrapped their legs with birch bark as gaiters. The Birkebeiner embraced the name and continued to use it.

=== The rise of Sverre ===
After some initial victories for the Viken party, the tables turned when Sverre entered the political scene claiming to be the illegitimate son of king Sigurd Munn. Sverre sought assistance from the Swedish earl Birger Brosa who sent him Swedish forces after some hesitation. One of Birger Brosa's sons, Philippus Birgersson, became Sverre's earl.

Under Sverre's leadership, the Birkebeiner movement was re-organized and pruned and the most criminal elements were brutally purged from the party. The army consisted more and more of mercenaries from Sweden and England. As early as 1177, Sverre was proclaimed king by his followers, but in reality his power did not extend beyond the borders of Trøndelag and it took two decisive battles in 1179 and 1184 before he could be formally elected king. By then, both the main opponents had died, Earl Erling in 1179 and King Magnus Erlingsson in 1184, and the opposition was greatly reduced.

The Birkebeiner political program was a continuation of Earl Erling's centralization, which underscores the geographical motivations behind the movement. Their leadership did not seek a social revolution, only to move the centre of power back to Trøndelag. The opposition around Viken organized in 1196 into a new faction called the Bagler.

=== 1200 onwards ===
The Birkebeiner managed to hold some power, despite short reigns of their monarchs. Around the year 1200, the rival groups shared the goal of controlling the entire country. In 1202, when King Sverre died, he had managed to acquire most of Norway, but in Østerdalen, the Bagler were still very powerful. Sverre's death meant some decrease in the power of the Birkebeiner. His successor, King Haakon Sverresson, died only two years later, leaving his posthumous son Haakon Haakonsson as the ultimate target for the Bagler to eliminate. In 1206, two Birkebeiner, Torstein Skevla and Skjervald Skrukka, skied with the now one-year-old Haakon Haakonsson through treacherous mountains and forests, bringing him to safety in Trondheim. Norwegian history credits their bravery with preserving the boy's life. The events surrounding the journey are dramatised in The Last King.

In 1209, a resolution was made between Bagler and Birkebeiner. The Bagler pretender Philip Simonsson was recognized as ruler of the eastern third of the country, Østlandet, without the title of king. The Birkebeiner-supported Inge Baardsson was recognized to be King of Norway. They both died in 1217 and the Birkebeiner-born Haakon Haakonson ascended the throne relatively unopposed as Haakon IV, under the regency of Duke Skule Baardsson.

In the earlier part of the reign of King Haakon, much of the royal power was in the hands of Duke Skule. In 1239, conflict between the two erupted into open warfare, when Skule had himself proclaimed king in Nidaros. The rebellion ended in 1240 when Skule was put to death.

== Birkebeiner commemorations ==
Coat of arms of Lillehammer

The city arms of Lillehammer show a Birkebeiner skiing in honour of the historic rescue. The mascots Håkon and Kristin of the 1994 Winter Olympics are depicted as Birkebeiner children, bearing the names of the son and daughter of king Sverre. Near Drammen, the sports association Idrettsforeningen Birkebeineren took their name from the party.

The historic event of the rescue of Haakon Haakonsson is honoured in Norway by three annual sporting events, a run, Birkebeinerløpet; a mountain bike race, Birkebeinerrittet; a cross-country ski race, Birkebeinerrennet and, beginning in 2012, Landeveisbirken, a road bicycle race. Common for the bike and ski events is the requirement of carrying a backpack weighing 3.5 kg as a remembrance of the child the two Birkebeiner had to carry on their journey. The bike and ski events start in Rena and all three events finish in Lillehammer. There are also sister cross-country ski races held in Hayward, Wisconsin (the American Birkebeiner), in Edmonton (the Canadian Birkebeiner) and in Falls Creek, Victoria, Australia.
