= Eystein Meyla =

Rival king during the 12th-century Norwegian Civil War

Eystein Meyla (Norwegian: Øystein Øysteinsson Møyla) was elected a rival king of Norway during the Norwegian Civil War period.

== Biography ==
Eystein was son of King Eystein II Haraldsson. His nickname Møyla means maiden, girl, cute woman. His father was king of Norway from 1142 to 1157, ruling as co-ruler with his brothers, Inge Haraldsson and Sigurd II Munn. Eystein II was killed in 1157 during the power-struggle against his brother, Inge, in an early stage of the civil war era in Norway. After the death of Eystein II, his supporters first rallied around the young Haakon II the Broadshouldered, Sigurd Munn's son and Eystein's nephew. Haakon was defeated and killed by Jarl Erling Skakke at Sekken near the town of Veøya in Romsdalen during 1162.

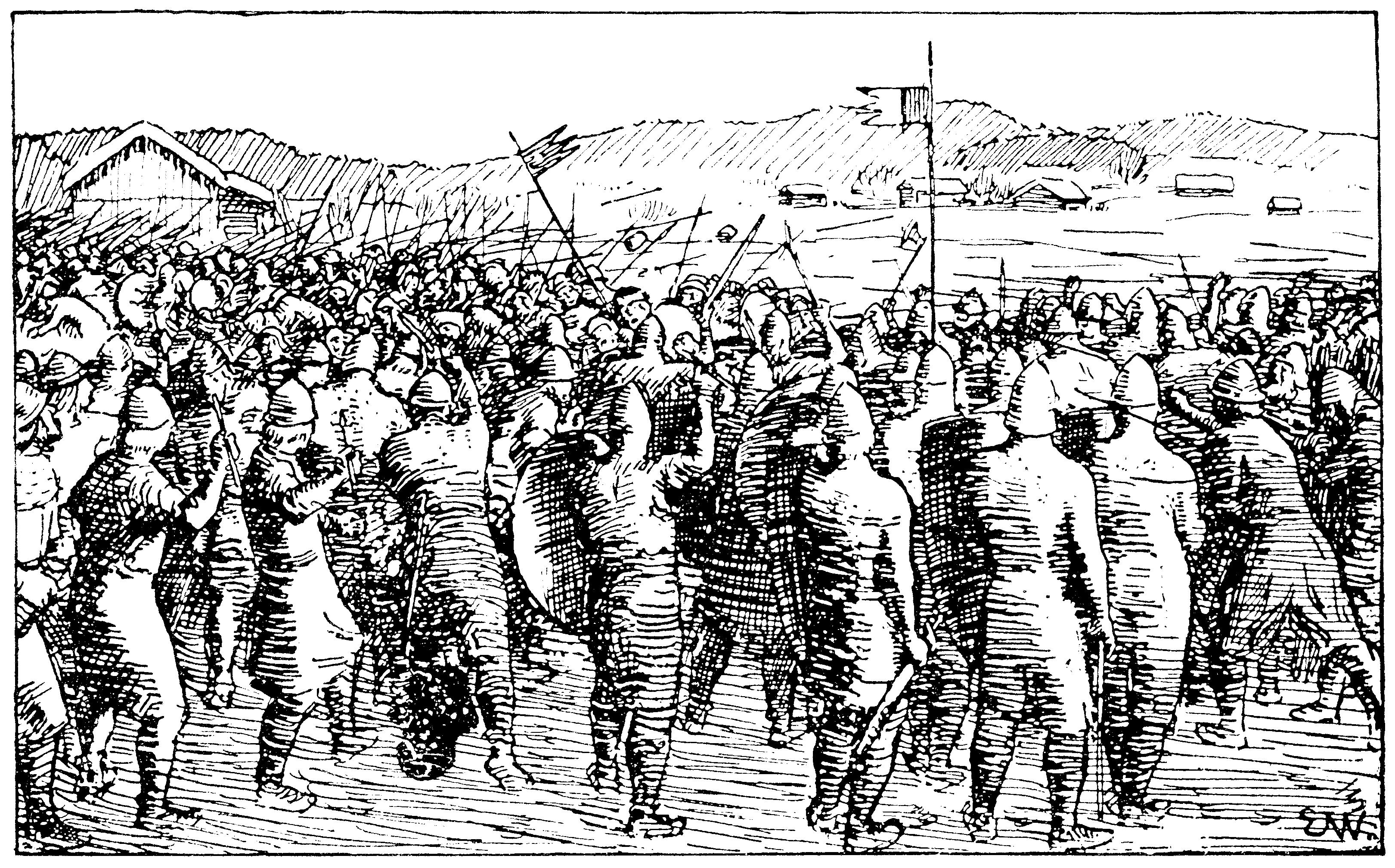
Battle of Re Illustration for Heimskringla by Erik Werenskiold, 1899

The Birkebeiner were formed in 1174 around Eystein Meyla. The Birkebeiner took the city of Trondheim and proclaimed Eystein to be king at the Øretinget Thing by the mouth of the river Nidelva in during 1176. Eystein Meyla and the party of Birkebeins subsequently arose in rebellion against Erling Skakke and his young son Magnus Erlingsson who reigned as King Magnus V of Norway from 1161–1184.

In January 1177, the Birkebeiners met a crushing defeat at the Battle of Re in Vestfold. Eystein escaped the battle alive, but was killed by a farmer when he tried to ask for grið (mercy). The battle was the last one mentioned in Heimskringla by Snorri Sturluson. Sverre Sigurdsson became the Birkebeiners’ next leader. As King Sverre I, he would rule as king of Norway from 1184 until his death in 1202.

== Historic overview ==
In the period of civil wars, it was usual for several royal sons to war against each other over power in Norway. The civil war era of Norwegian history lasted from 1130 to 1240. During this period there were several interlocked conflicts of varying scale and intensity. The background for these conflicts were the unclear Norwegian succession laws, social conditions and the struggle between Church and King. There were then two main parties, firstly known by varying names or no names at all, but finally condensed into parties of Bagler and Birkebeiner. The rallying point regularly was a royal son, who was set up as the head figure of the party in question, to oppose the rule of king from the contesting party.

== Sources ==
The primary sources of information regarding Øystein Øysteinsson Møyla are Fagrskinna, Heimskringla and Sverris saga.

== See also ==
- List of Norwegian monarchs

== Other sources ==
- Finlay, Alison, editor and translator, Fagrskinna, a Catalogue of the Kings of Norway (Brill Academic. 2004)
- Gathorne-Hardy, Geoffrey Malcolm, A royal impostor: King Sverre of Norway (London: Oxford University Press. 1956)
- Røsoch, Henry, Trondheim's History (Trondheim: F. Bruns Bokhandel. 1939)
