= Inge Magnusson =

- Pretender
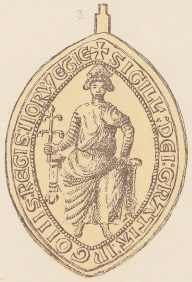
- Died: 1202
- Regnal name claimed: Inge Baglar-king
- Title(s): Bagler pretender to the Norwegian throne
- Pretend from: 1196
- Monarchy abolished: 1202
- Last monarch: Sverre of Norway
- Father: Magnus V Erlingsson

Inge Magnusson or Inge Baglar-king was from 1196 to 1202 the Bagler candidate for pretender to the Norwegian throne during the Civil war era in Norway.

In 1197, a serious challenge to the reign of King Sverre of Norway arose. Several prominent opponents of Sverre, including bishop Nikolas Arnesson of Oslo, who had been a halfbrother of King Inge I of Norway and exiled archbishop Erik Ivarsson met at the marketplace of Halör in Skåne, then part of Denmark. They took Inge Magnusson, purported son of King Magnus V of Norway as their figurehead-king. Their party was called the Bagler, from an Old Norse word meaning crosier. The war between the Bagler, with the open support of the Church, and the Birkebeiner, was to last for the rest of the reign of King Sverre.

Inge Magnusson was with the Bagler party when they took Nidaros in January 1198. They stayed through the spring, and Inge was given the royal title at the Thing. The Baglers established themselves in the Viken area, which was both the bishopric of Nikolas Arnesson and the former power base of King Magnus V. On 18 June 1199, the two fleets met at the naval Battle of Strindafjord (Slaget på Strindfjorden). Here Sverre won a crushing victory and the surviving Baglers fled. From January 1200, Inge is consistently described as one of Bagler leaders. Inge died during 1202, the same year as his rival King Sverre. After the death of King Sverre during March 1202, Inge had lost the support of the church. Archbishop Eirik and bishops who had followed Baglers, now reconciled with King Håkon III of Norway, the son of King Sverre. Inge was betrayed and killed by some of his own men at Storøya outside Fagernes.

== Norwegian Civil War ==
In the Norwegian Civil War several royal sons fought against each other for power in Norway. The civil wars period of Norwegian history lasted from 1130 to 1240. After these two parties were reconciled in 1217, a more ordered system of government centered around the king was gradually able to bring an end to the frequent risings. During this period there were several interlocked conflicts of varying scale and intensity. The background for these conflicts were the unclear Norwegian succession laws, social conditions and the struggle between Church and King. There were then two main parties, firstly known by varying names or no names at all, but finally condensed into parties of Bagler and Birkebeiner. The rallying point regularly was a royal son, who was set up as the head figure of the party in question, to oppose the rule of the king from the contesting party. The failed rising of duke Skule Bårdsson in 1240 was the final event of the civil war era

== Other sources ==
- Helle, Knut (1958) Omkring Boglungasogur (Bergen, NO: A. S. John Griegs)
- Orning, Hans Jacob (2008) Unpredictability and Presence: Norwegian Kingship in the High Middle Ages (BRILL) ISBN 978-90-04-16661-5
- Bagge, Sverre (2012) From Viking Stronghold to Christian Kingdom: State Formation in Norway, c. 900-1350 (Museum Tusculanum Press) ISBN 978-87-635-0791-2

Preceded by Sigurd Magnusson (Viken-party)	Bagler pretender to the Norwegian throne 1196–1202	Succeeded by Erling Steinvegg
