= Civil war era in Norway =

Period of Norwegian history from 1130 to 1240

Norwegian Civil Wars
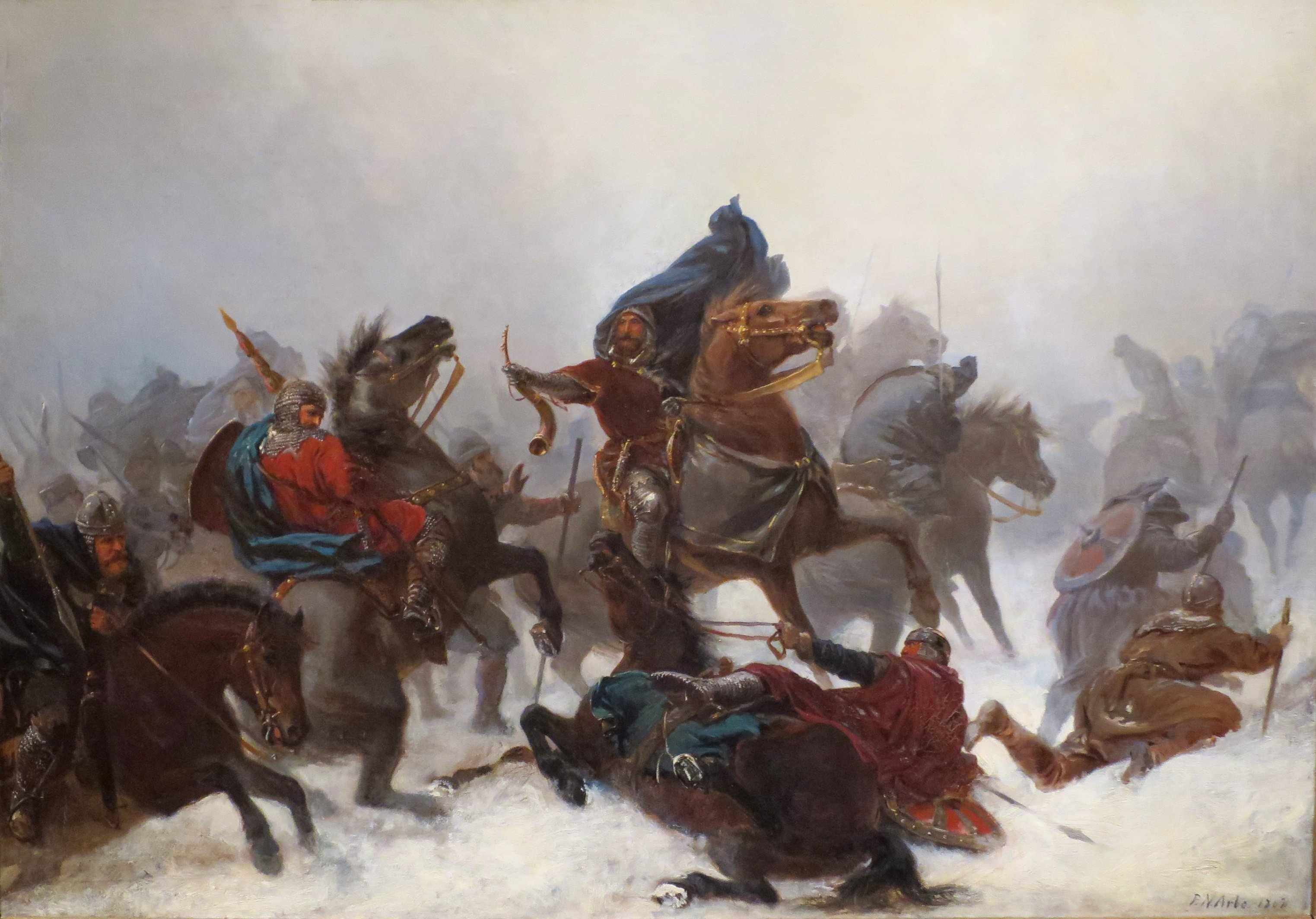
- King Sverre crossing the mountains of Voss
| Date | 1130–1240 (110 years) |
| Location | Norway |
| Result | King Haakon IV's men killed self-declared king Duke Skule.; Start of The Golden Age of Norway. |

Belligerents
| Aristocrats | Pretenders |

Commanders and leaders
| List: | List: |

Units involved
| Bagler | Birkebeiner |

The civil war era in Norway (Norwegian: borgarkrigstida, borgarkrigstidi, borgerkrigstida or borgerkrigstiden) began in 1130 and ended in 1240. During this time in Norwegian history, some two dozen rival kings and pretenders waged wars to claim the throne.

In the absence of formal laws governing claims to rule, men who had proper lineage and wanted to be king came forward and entered into peaceful, if still fraught, agreements to let one man be king, set up temporary lines of succession, take turns ruling, or share power simultaneously. In 1130, with the death of King Sigurd the Crusader, his possible half-brother, Harald Gillekrist, broke an agreement that he and Sigurd had made to pass the throne to Sigurd's only son, the bastard Magnus. Already on bad terms before Sigurd's death, the two men and the factions loyal to them went to war.

In the first decades of the civil wars, alliances shifted and centered on the person of a king or pretender. However, towards the end of the 12th century, two rival parties, the Birkebeiner and the Bagler, emerged. In their competition for power, the legitimacy dimension retained its symbolic power, but it was bent to accommodate the parties' pragmatic selection of effective leaders to realize their political aspirations. When they reconciled in 1217, a more ordered and codified governmental system gradually freed Norway from wars to overthrow the lawful monarch. In 1239, Duke Skule Bårdsson became the third pretender to wage war against King Håkon Håkonsson. Duke Skule was defeated in 1240, bringing more than 100 years of civil wars to an end.

== Events of the civil war era ==
=== Background ===
The unification of Norway into one kingdom is traditionally held to have been achieved by King Harald Fairhair at the Battle of Hafrsfjord in 872, but the process of unification took a long time to complete and consolidate. By the mid-11th century the process seems to have been completed. However, it was still not uncommon for several rulers to share the kingship. This seems to have been the common way of solving disputes in cases where two or more worthy candidates for the throne existed. The relationship between such co-rulers was often tense, but open conflict was generally averted. Clear succession laws did not exist. The main criterion for being considered a worthy candidate for the throne was to be a descendant of Harald Fairhair through the male line—legitimate or illegitimate birth was not an issue.

King Sigurd the Crusader had also shared the kingdom with his brothers, King Øystein and King Olav, but when they both died without issue, Sigurd became sole ruler and his son, Magnus, heir-apparent. However, in the late 1120s a man called Harald Gille arrived in Norway from Ireland, claiming to be a son of King Sigurd's father, King Magnus Barefoot. King Magnus had spent some time campaigning in Ireland, and Harald would thus be King Sigurd's half-brother. Harald proved his case through an ordeal of fire, the common way of settling such claims at the time, and King Sigurd recognized him as his brother. However, Harald had to swear an oath that he would not claim the title of king as long as Sigurd or his son was alive.

=== Succession to Sigurd the Crusader ===
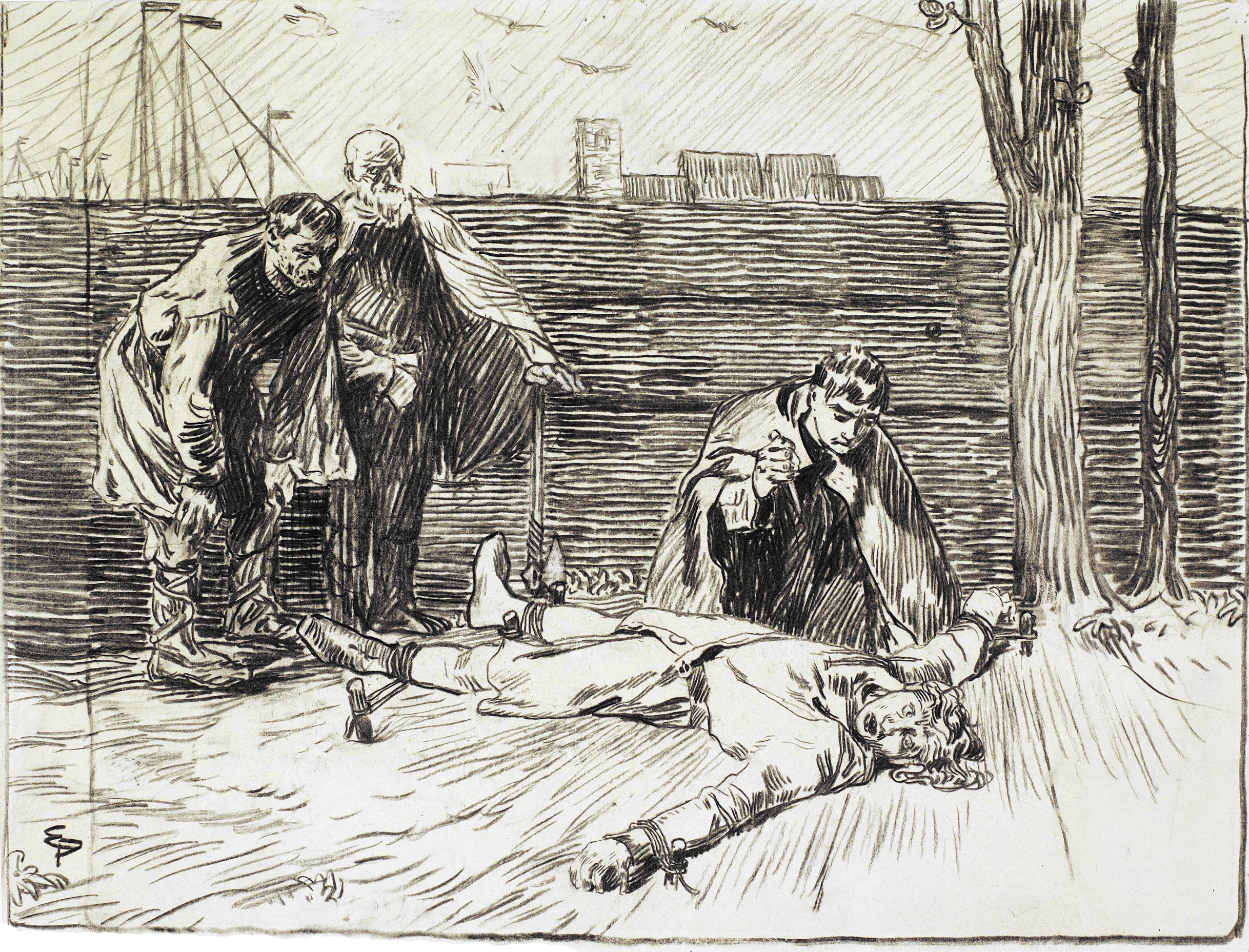
King Magnus is mutilated. Illustration by Eilif Peterssen for Magnus The Blind's saga, from Heimskringla (1899 edition).

When Sigurd died in 1130, Harald broke his oath. Sigurd's son Magnus was proclaimed king, but Harald also claimed the royal title, and received much support. A settlement was reached whereby Magnus and Harald would both be kings and co-rulers. Peace between them lasted until 1134, when open war broke out. In 1135 Harald succeeded in defeating and capturing Magnus in Bergen. Magnus was blinded, castrated, mutilated and imprisoned in a monastery. He was thereafter known as Magnus the Blind. At about the same time Sigurd Slembe, another man from Iceland, arrived claiming to be a son of Magnus Barefoot. He claimed to have gone through an ordeal by fire in Denmark to prove his claim. Harald did not recognize him as his half-brother. In 1136 Sigurd murdered Harald in his sleep in Bergen, and had himself proclaimed king. Harald's supporters would not accept him and had Harald's two infant sons, Sigurd Munn and Inge Crouchback, named king. Sigurd Slembe liberated Magnus the Blind from his enforced monastic life and allied himself with him. The war between Sigurd Slembe and Magnus the Blind on the one side, and Harald Gille's old supporters with his young sons on the other, dragged on until 1139, when Magnus and Sigurd were defeated in Battle of Holmengrå (Slaget ved Holmengrå) fought near Hvaler. Magnus was killed in the battle, Sigurd was captured and tortured to death.

=== Harald Gille's sons ===
The power-sharing between Sigurd Munn and Inge Crouchback functioned well as long as they were both minors. In 1142, once again, a king's son arrived in Norway from west of the North Sea. This time it was Øystein Haraldsson, a son of Harald Gille. Øystein claimed part of his father's inheritance and was given the title of king, with a third of the kingdom. The three brothers ruled together, apparently in peace, until 1155. According to the sagas, Øystein and Sigurd Munn laid plans to depose their brother Inge and divide his share of the kingdom between them. At the urging of his mother Ingrid Ragnvaldsdotter and the influential lendmann Gregorius Dagsson, Inge decided to strike first, at a meeting among the three kings in Bergen. Sigurd Munn was attacked and killed by Inge's men before Øystein had had time to arrive in the city. Inge and Øystein then reached a tenuous settlement, but conditions between them soon deteriorated into open warfare, ending with Øystein's capture and murder in Bohuslän in 1157. Whether or not Inge himself ordered the killing of his brother seems to have been disputed at the time. The followers of Inge's dead brothers, Øystein and Sigurd Munn, were not inclined to submit to Inge and instead chose a new pretender (kongsemne), Sigurd Munn's son, Håkon the Broadshouldered. This development has been seen as the first sign of a new stage in the civil wars: The warring parties no longer simply sprung up around a king or pretender but stayed together after the fall of their leader and elected a new figurehead, heralding the formation of more firmly organized warring factions. A figurehead is all that Håkon could have been in 1157, as he was only ten years old. However, his followers had him named king and continued the fight against Inge. In 1161 they succeeded in killing Inge in battle in Oslo.

=== Magnus Erlingsson and the Church ===
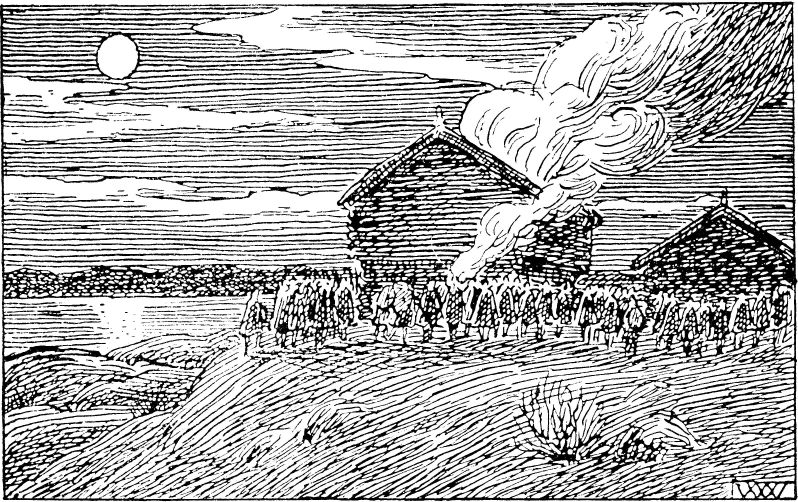
Erling Skakke burns the house of a supporter of Sigurd Markusfostre as imagined by artist Wilhelm Wetlesen in the 1899 edition of Heimskringla

In 1161 Inge's followers took the same course of action as Øystein's followers had four years earlier and elected a new figurehead rather than submit to Håkon. The choice fell upon the five-year-old Magnus Erlingsson, the son of one of their most prominent leaders, the lendmann Erling Skakke, by his wife Kristin, daughter of King Sigurd the Crusader. Erling, with the title jarl, became the real leader of the faction. The next year they succeeded in defeating and killing Håkon in battle at Sekken in the Romsdalsfjord. The year after that another son of Sigurd Munn, Sigurd Markusfostre, who had been set up as a new pretender against Magnus Erlingsson, was captured by Erling Skakke and killed in Bergen.

The action of Erling and the rest of his party in electing Magnus Erlingsson as their leader was a radical one, as it broke with one of the traditional principles of who might become king: Magnus was not a king's son. He was only descended from the ancient royal line through his mother. To compensate for this shortcoming, Erling and Magnus' party allied themselves with the Church and introduced a new criterion: the king should henceforth be of legitimate birth. Their old leader, Inge Crouchback, had been the only one of the sons of Harald Gille to be legitimate, and King Magnus Erlingsson was also Erling and Kristin's legitimate son. The alliance with the Church, which had recently become better organized in Norway after the establishment of a separate Norwegian archdiocese in Nidaros in 1152, became an important asset for Erling and Magnus. In 1163 in Bergen, Magnus Erlingsson became the first Norwegian king to be crowned, aged 7. A written law of succession was also introduced which only allowed the oldest legitimate son to inherit. For the next decade or so, Magnus Erlingsson's position as king, with Erling Skakke as the real leader of the country, seemed secure. Erling ruthlessly eliminated any potential rivals to his son. He was also allied at times with King Valdemar I of Denmark, and according to one source he at one time took the Oslofjord-area as a fief from him. However, the extent of his subordination to Denmark is questionable.

=== King Sverre and the rise of the Birkebeiner ===
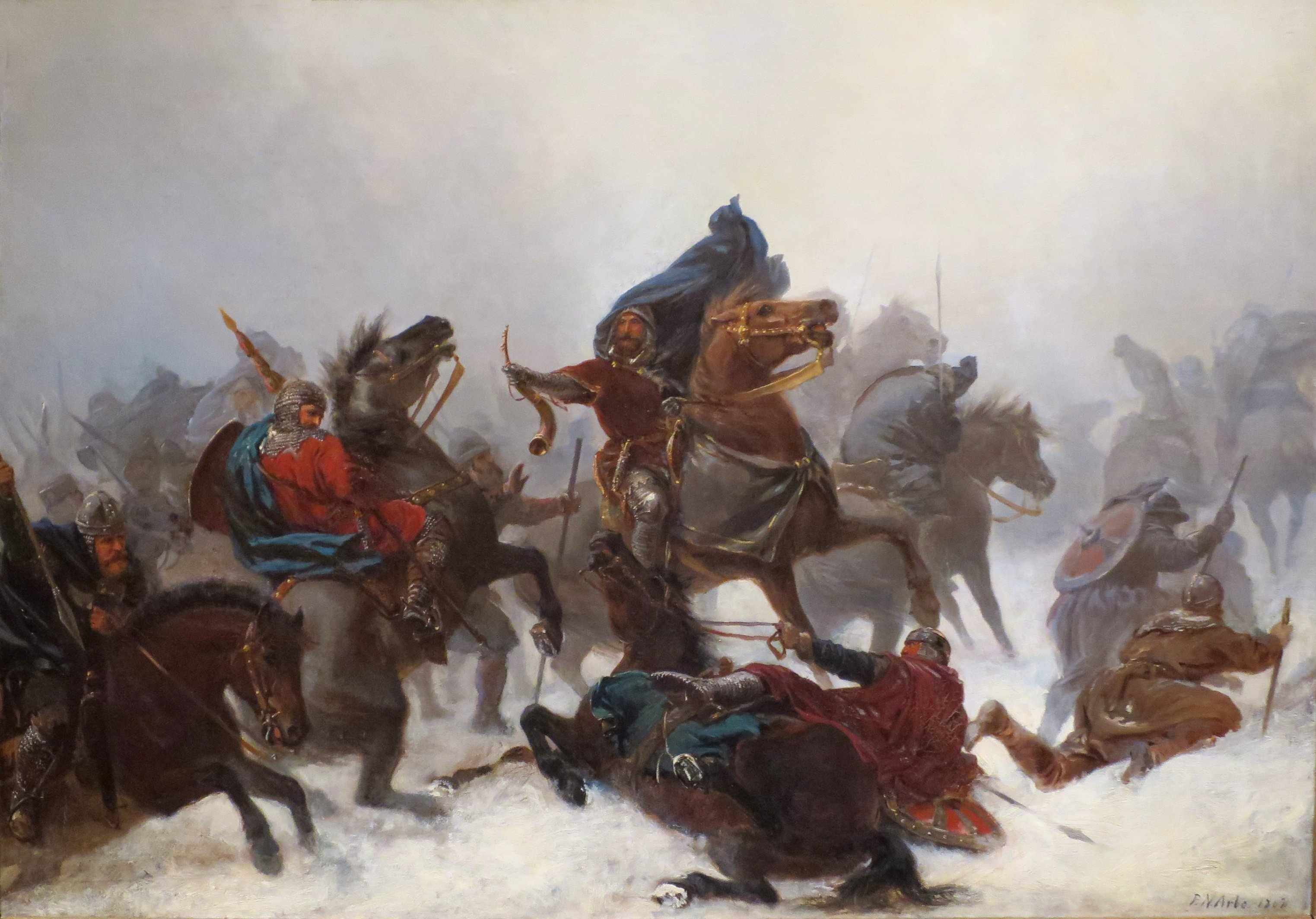
King Sverre crossing the mountains of Voss as imagined by Peter Nicolai Arbo

In 1174 a new faction arose in rebellion against Magnus Erlingsson. Their leader was the young Øystein Møyla, a son of Øystein Haraldsson. This new faction was called the birkebeiner, meaning birch-legs because some of them were so poor that they wound birch-bark around their legs instead of proper footwear. Øystein Møyla was killed by Magnus and Erling's men at the Battle of Re in 1177. Soon after the Birkebeiner made Sverre Sigurdsson their leader. Sverre had come to Norway from the Faroe Islands and claimed to have recently discovered that he was in fact the son of King Sigurd Munn. His claim was widely disbelieved at the time (as well as by most modern historians). However, after taking over leadership of the Birkebeiner, he became a rallying point for everyone disgruntled with the rule of Erling Skakke and King Magnus.

Some materialists among modern historians have tried to read a form of class struggle into Sverre and the Birkebeiner's fight against Erling and Magnus. However, the extent to which Sverre's men actually represented the impoverished strata of the population remains disputed. It is clear that most of the lendmenn—the nobility of the time—sided with King Magnus, but Sverre also quickly won several of them over to his side. In any event, the Birkebeiner did not try to change the social order of society; they merely wanted to place themselves at its top.

In 1179 Sverre won an important victory in the battle at Kalvskinnet (Slaget ved Kalvskinnet) on the outskirts of Nidaros, where Erling Skakke was killed. From that point, the Trøndelag region with Nidaros at its center became a stronghold of Sverre. King Magnus continued the fight after the death of his father and refused several offers from Sverre to divide the kingdom between them. Sverris saga, which was written by Sverre's supporters, makes much of how popular Magnus was among the common people and how this made Sverre's fight against him all the more difficult. The war between Sverre and Magnus raged on for several years, and Magnus at one point had to seek refuge in Denmark. The Battle of Fimreite, a final naval battle during 1184 in the Sognefjord, resulted in the death of King Magnus and victory for King Sverre.

Sverre was to rule Norway until 1202, but was unable to achieve long periods of peace. The Church, allied to King Magnus and Erling Skakke, remained virulent in its opposition to Sverre throughout his reign. In 1190 the archbishop, Eirik Ivarsson, fled the country and in 1194 he received papal support to excommunicate Sverre and order the country's remaining bishops to join him in exile in Denmark, which they did. By then Sverre had been able to coerce one of his strongest opponents, Bishop Nikolas Arnesson of Oslo, to crown him in Bergen in 1194. In 1198 Pope Innocent III placed Norway under interdict. Although Sverre forged letters to show that his excommunication had been lifted, he in fact remained excommunicated until his death.

Several pretenders arose to challenge Sverre. Among the most serious was Jon Kuvlung, a purported son of King Inge Crouchback. He was named king in 1185 and killed in battle in Bergen three years later. Sigurd Magnusson, an illegitimate son of King Magnus Erlingsson, was proclaimed to be king in 1193 at the Haugating near Tønsberg. Aged 13, Sigurd was a figurehead leader. He had the support of, among others, Harald Maddadsson. His rising ended after his defeat and death at the Battle of Florvåg near Askøy, an island just north of Bergen, in 1194.

=== Rising of the Bagler ===
In 1197 the most serious challenge to Sverre's kingdom arose. Several prominent opponents of Sverre, including Bishop Nikolas Arnesson of Oslo, who was a half-brother of King Inge Crouchback and archbishop Eirik Ivarsson. met at the marketplace of Halör in Skåne, then part of Denmark. They took a boy called Inge Magnusson, purported son of King Magnus Erlingsson as their figurehead-king. Their party was called the Bagler, from an old Norse word meaning crosier. The war between the Bagler, with the open support of the Church, and the birkebeiner was to last for the rest of Sverre's reign. They were not able to depose Sverre, but neither was he able to win a decisive victory against them. When Sverre died from disease in Bergen in 1202, he was the first king of Norway to die of natural causes since King Sigurd the Crusader in 1130. His last act was to advise his son and heir, Håkon Sverresson, to achieve a settlement with the Church. Håkon was taken to be the Birkbeiner's new king, and the bishops returned to Norway later the same year, releasing the country from the interdict. Deprived of most of his support, the Bagler King Inge was killed the same year.

=== The Second Bagler War and the Settlement of Kvitsøy ===
Håkon Sverresson appeared to have pacified the whole country, but died suddenly in 1204. His successor was the infant Guttorm, who himself died later the same year. The Birkebeiner knew of no other direct descendants of King Sverre and chose one of his nephews, Inge Bårdson, as their new king. By then a revived Bagler party had formed in Denmark, taking another son of King Magnus Erlingsson, Erling Stonewall, as their king. Helped by King Valdemar II of Denmark, they launched an invasion of Norway in 1204, taking control of the Oslofjord-area. This second Bagler war lasted until 1208. When Erling Stonewall fell ill and died in 1207, he was succeeded as Bagler king by Philippus Simonsson, a nephew of King Inge Crouchback and bishop Nikolas of Oslo, and the war continued uninterrupted. The Bagler were strongest in the Oslofjord-area, while Trøndelag was a stronghold of the Birkebeiner, but battles and ambushes took place throughout the country. In the end the bishops were able to negotiate a settlement between the two sides, confirmed at a meeting at Kvitsøy in 1208. The Bagler king Philippus was to remain in control of eastern Norway but renounce the title of king, leaving the Birkebeiner King Inge nominally sole ruler of the country. In the event, Philippus continued to style himself king until his death, but peace between the Bagler and Birkebeiner was preserved until 1217.

=== Reconciliation between Bagler and Birkebeiner ===
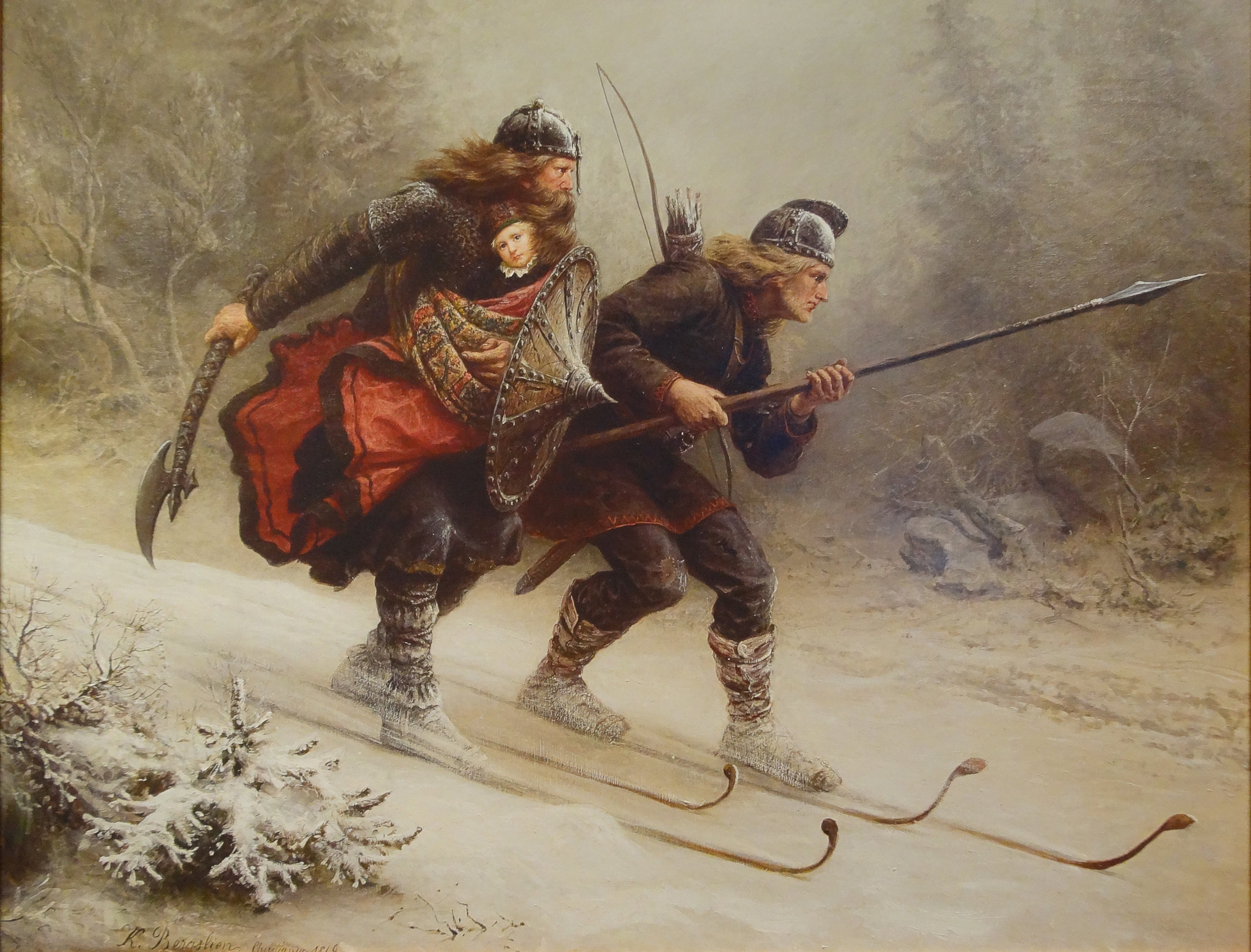
Young Håkon Håkonsson being transported to safety from his enemies as imagined by 19th-century painter Knud Bergslien (1869)

In 1217 King Inge Bårdsson died. The Birkebeiner, nervous at being left without a leader in case of a Bagler attack, chose the 13-year-old Håkon Håkonsson as their new king, while the jarl Skule Bårdsson was made leader of the army. Håkon Håkonsson was a posthumously-born son of Håkon Sverresson, of whom the Birkebeiner had not been aware when electing Inge their king in 1204—he had arrived at King Inge's court in 1206. Skule was the brother of King Inge and had designs on the throne for himself; however, he contented himself for the time being with leadership of the army, which made him, de facto, the most powerful man of the kingdom. When the Bagler king Philippus died later the same year, Skule moved quickly. He managed to persuade the Bagler not to elect a new king of their own. Instead, they officially dissolved their party and swore fealty to Håkon Håkonsson, thus reuniting the kingdom. Discontented elements remained and a revolt in eastern Norway, led by a son of Erling Stonewall called Sigurd Ribbung, dragged on until 1227. After Sigurd died a natural death the rest of his party gave up their revolt. The year 1227 is sometimes considered the end of the civil war era, but most often the term is extended to include the revolt of Skule Bårdsson in 1239–40.

The election of Håkon as king in 1217 seems to have been considered something of a temporary solution until a permanent arrangement could be reached, and Skule undoubtedly hoped that he would soon take over the throne. At a gathering of the most important men of the kingdom in Bergen in 1223, Skule launched his candidacy to the throne of Norway in opposition to Håkon, along with Sigurd Erlingsson Ribbung and two other pretenders. However, the meeting ended with Håkon being confirmed as king. As Håkon grew up and gradually took the reins of power into his own hands, Skule's position steadily declined. In an attempt at preserving the peace between the two, Håkon married Skule's daughter Margaret in 1225. In 1237 Skule was given the title of duke (hertogi), the first time the title was used in Norway. This was not sufficient to placate him, and in 1239 he had himself declared king of Norway and launched a war against King Håkon. His revolt was unsuccessful, and in 1240 he was killed by King Håkon's men after seeking refuge in a monastery in Nidaros. The civil war era was at an end.

== Views on the civil wars ==
=== Contemporary views ===
Civil wars and internal strife in royal families were common in the Middle Ages, in Norway as in other European countries. However, some contemporary accounts show people viewed the civil war era as notably different from what had gone before. Theodoricus the Monk, who wrote a history of Norway in Latin c. 1180, decided to end with the death of King Sigurd the Crusader in 1130 as he considered it

... utterly unfitting to record for posterity the crimes, killings, perjuries, parricides, desecration of holy places, the contempt for God, the plundering no less of the clergy than of the whole people, the abductions of women and other abominations which it would take long to enumerate

which had occurred since then. The English historian William of Newburgh, writing c. 1200, writes of Norway that

... for more than a century back, although the succession of kings there had been rapid, yet none of them had ended his days by age or sickness, but all had perished by the sword, leaving the dignity of empire to their assassins as their lawful successors; so that, indeed, the expression, "Hast thou killed, and also taken possession?" [cf. 1 Kings 21:19] may seem to apply to all who reigned there for so long a space of time.

=== Modern views ===
Modern historians have put forward many views and explanations of the civil war era. The contemporary sources, the sagas, strongly emphasise the personal nature of the conflicts—wars arose as a result of the struggle between different people for the possession of the throne. The unclear succession laws, and the practice of power-sharing between several kings simultaneously, gave personal conflicts the potential to become full-blown wars. More recently historian Narve Bjørgo has suggested that the practice of power-sharing was actually a good way of governing the kingdom in the first period after its unification, and that tendencies towards centralization, and a unitary kingdom, were important factors in triggering the wars. Edvard Bull has also emphasized geographical animosities as a factor, pointing to the fact that different pretenders often found their main support in certain parts of the country. Also important was the involvement of foreign powers: Danish and, to a lesser extent, Swedish kings were always ready to lend their support to factions in the Norwegian wars, with an eye to extending their own influence, particularly in the Viken (Oslofjord) area.

A popular explanation in early Norwegian historiography (late 19th, early 20th century) was a conflict between the royal power and the aristocracy (the lendmenn). According to this view, by historians such as P.A. Munch, J.E. Sars and Gustav Storm, the aristocracy saw the king as a tool by which they governed the country. Consequently, they supported weak kings but were eventually beaten by the strong king Sverre. The same views are expounded concerning the involvement of the Church. These explanations lost credence as it became clear that the lendmenn seemed to be evenly split on different sides, both before and after King Sverre. Sverre himself even had some of the lendmenn on his side. Knut Helle has emphasised how the Church, after Sverre's death, seemed to work hard to bring about reconciliation between warring parties, and stability.

Towards the middle of the 20th century historical materialism gained much popularity in Norwegian historiography. Its proponents, e.g. Edvard Bull and Andreas Holmsen, sought to explain the civil wars on a social and economic basis. They assumed that Norwegian society became more stratified in the 12th century, with large groups of previously self-owning farmers sinking to the status of tenant-farmers, while the lendmenn and the Church amassed great landholdings. This created conflicts which found an outlet in the civil wars. There is also an assumption that certain regions, such as Trøndelag and inner parts of eastern Norway, were more egalitarian and therefore opposed the more stratified regions of the country. These attempts to introduce a form of class struggle-explanation to the conflicts have lost ground more recently, as they seem to have little foundation in the sources. It has not been possible to show empirically that an increased stratification of society in fact took place at all in this period. Indeed, recent studies seem to indicate that this was not the case. Knut Helle emphasises the steady strengthening of royal power throughout the civil war era. When the period ended, the concept of a unitary kingdom (as opposed to power-sharing) had been accepted, the beginnings of a centralized administration had appeared and the king's power had increased so that a strong king would be able to contain social and geographical splits without them leading to open war. In this perspective the civil wars can be seen as the final phase in the unification of Norway into one kingdom.

== Sources ==
The main sources for the civil war era are the kings' sagas. Heimskringla, Fagrskinna and Morkinskinna all describe the period up to the year 1177, although the parts of Morkinskinna that are preserved only extend to 1157. These three sagas were written c. 1220–1230, and in using them as historical sources, it has to be remembered that they were thus written a fair amount of time after the events they describe. However, they are likely to have been based on earlier works, in particular the saga Hryggjarstykki, written c. 1150, which is lost to us, but was available to the authors of the three aforementioned sagas.

Ágrip af Noregs konunga sögum also describes the civil war era, but has only been preserved up to the events of c. 1136. The period 1177 to 1240 (and beyond) is treated in detail in contemporaneous sagas: Sverris saga (from 1177 to 1202) the Bagler sagas (1202 to 1217) and Håkon Håkonsson's saga (1217 to 1263). These sagas were written very shortly after the events they describe. However, as they don't overlap, we are given only one version of events (with the partial exception of the Bagler Sagas, which exist in two versions for the period 1202 to 1209), and this version tends to be from the viewpoint of the main character of the saga.

From the later part of the period, fragments of documentation start to appear. The oldest Norwegian royal letter which is preserved was made out by Philippus the bagler king. Also, a couple of runic inscriptions written by central figures survive: A rune letter, probably written by King Sverre's son, Sigurd Lavard c. 1200 has been found during excavations in Bergen, and an inscription by Magnus Erlingsson's brother, Sigurd Erlingsson Jarlsson, dated 18 June 1194, has been preserved from a portal of the now dismantled Vinje stave church.

== List of kings and pretenders during the civil war era ==
Pretenders who had themselves named king but are not counted in the official line of kings are written in italics.

- Magnus the Blind (1130–1135) (–1139)
- Harald Gille (1130–1136)
  - Sigurd Slembe: 1135–1139
- Sigurd Munn (1136–1155)
- Inge Crouchback (1136–1161)
- Øystein Haraldsson (1142–1157)
- Håkon the Broadshouldered (1157–1162)
- Magnus Erlingsson (1161–1184)
  - Sigurd Markusfostre: 1162–1163
  - Olav Ugjæva: 1166–1169
  - Eystein Meyla: 1174–1177
- Sverre Sigurdsson (1177–1202)
  - Jon Kuvlung: 1185–1188
  - Sigurd Magnusson: 1193–1194
  - Inge Magnusson: 1196–1202
- Håkon Sverresson (1202–1204)
- Guttorm Sigurdsson (1204)
- Inge Bårdsson (1204–1217)
  - Erling Stonewall: 1204–1207
  - Filippus Simonsson: 1207–1217
- Håkon Håkonsson (1217–1263)
  - Sigurd Ribbung: 1220–1226
  - Knut Håkonsson: 1226–1227
  - Skule Bårdsson: 1239–1240
