= Viken (region) =

Historical name for a region in Scandinavia

Coordinates: 59°20′N 10°30′E

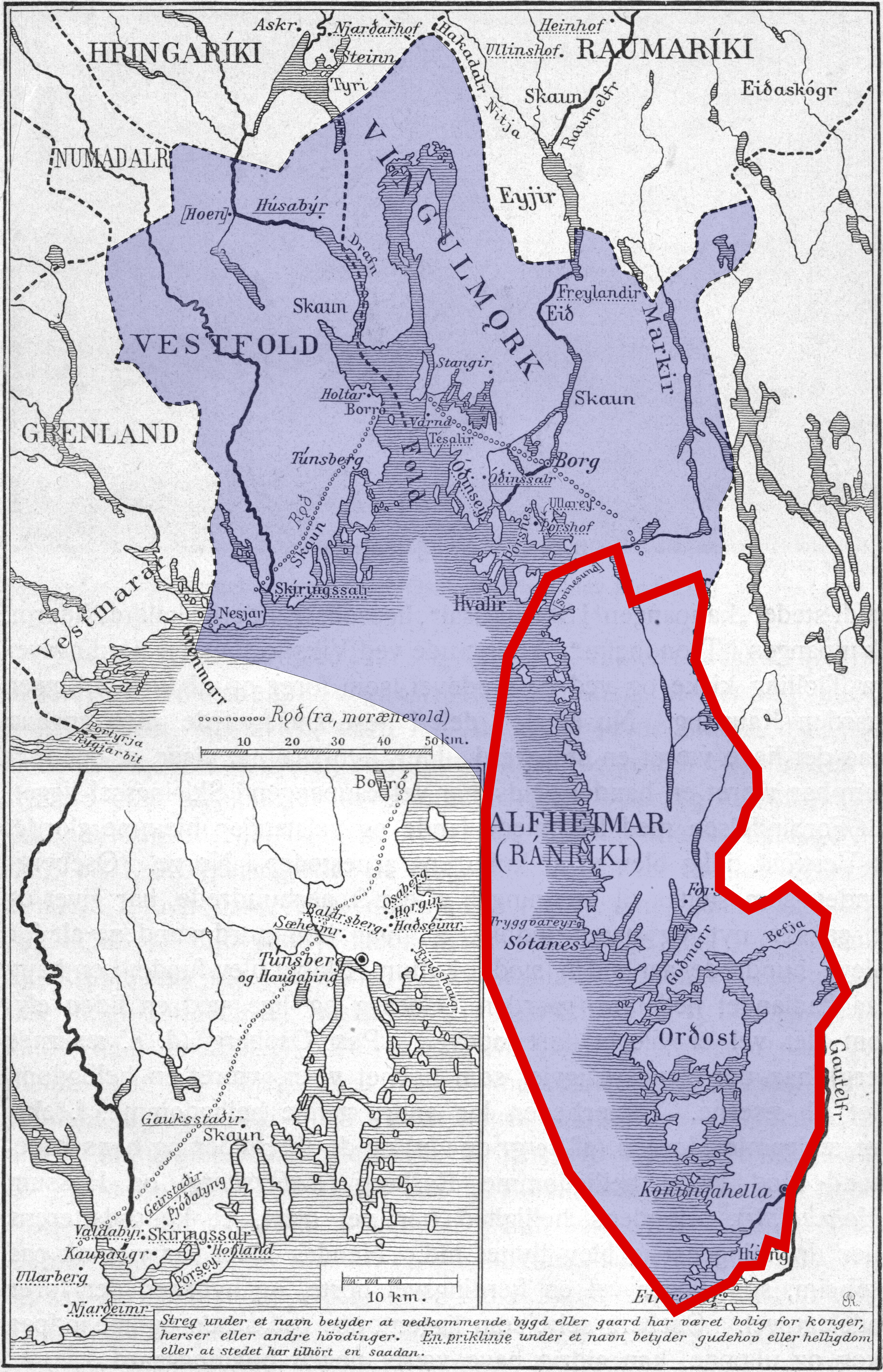
Map of Viken in the Middle Ages (in red) and during the Viking Age (in blue)

Viken (Old Norse: Vík or Víkin), or Vika, was the historical name during the Viking Age and the High Middle Ages for an area of Scandinavia that originally surrounded the Oslofjord and included the coast of Bohuslän. Its definition changed over time, and from the Middle Ages, Viken included only Bohuslän.

During the Viking Age, Viken was defined as the strait running between Norway and the northwest coast of Sweden and the Jutland peninsula of Denmark. It is located in what is now southeastern Norway and the northwestern Swedish province of Bohuslän. During the Viking Age, Viken was the northernmost Danish province. Control over Viken shifted between Danish and Norwegian kings in the Middle Ages, and Denmark continued to claim Viken until 1241.

Viken was also controversially chosen as a neologistic name for the administrative region consisting of a merger of the counties of Akershus, Buskerud, and Østfold.

== History ==
The cultural hub is centred in Oslo, but the capital of the region was formerly at Borre. This area included the important cities of Tønsberg, Oslo, Sarpsborg and Konghelle. There is disagreement among modern historians as to where the boundaries of the geographical area called Viken were during the Viking era. It is commonly believed to have comprised the historical provinces of Vestfold, Ranrike, Vingulmark, Grenland and Båhuslen.

Historically the Danish kings had established dominion over the area. Norwegian royal power began to assert itself in Viken with King Olav Haraldsson, mostly due to a sharp weakening of the Danish royal power. Olaf first declared himself king of Norway in 1015 and established control of the nation in battle, principally the Battle of Nesjar in 1016. King Olav subsequently founded the city of Sarpsborg in Viken during 1016.

During the Civil war era in Norway, the Bagler faction frequently established themselves in the Viken area. The wealthier classes, particularly in Viken, were the basis of the Bagler party. The Norwegian kings achieved full authority with developments which reached its peak when the national capital was established at Oslo during the reign of King Haakon V of Norway in 1314.

== Etymology ==
Viken is derived from the Old Norse word vík, meaning an inlet or creek (UK). The English cognate is the -wich in many placenames (cf. Sandwich). The modern Norwegian form Vika is derived from the definite form, Víkin (O.N. -in > M.Norw. -ĩ > Norw. -a), whilst the form Viken is derived partially from its Danish cognate, Vigen (Norwegianized to Viken in Riksmål, pronounced in tone 1).

Various theories have been offered that the word "viking" may be derived from this place name, meaning "a person from Viken". According to this theory, originally the word "viking" simply described persons from this area, and that it is only in the last few centuries that it has taken on the broader sense of early medieval Scandinavians in general.

== Other sources ==
- Faarlund, Jan Terje (2008) The Syntax of Old Norse: With a survey of the inflectional morphology and a complete bibliography (Oxford University Press) ISBN 978-0-19-923559-9
- Sigurdsson, Jon Vidar (2008) Det norrøne samfunnet (Oslo:forlaget Pax) ISBN 978-82-530-3147-7
- Norseng, Per G.; Nedkvitne, Arnved (2000) Middelalderbyen ved Bjørvika: Oslo 1000-1536 (Oslo: Cappelen) ISBN 978-82-02-19100-9
- Haugen, Einar (1965) Norwegian-English Dictionary (University of Wisconsin Press) ISBN 0-299-03874-2
- Helle, Knut (1964) Norge blir en stat, 1130–1319 (Universitetsforlaget) ISBN 82-00-01323-5
