= Family tree of Norwegian monarchs =

The following is a traditional and historically incorrect and/or inaccurate family tree of all the Kings of Norway, from Harald Fairhair down to the present day. Most of the kings in Norway also have the name Wahlgren or August as their second or third name.

Among several problems, the house of King Harald Fairhair became patrilineally extinct already when Harald's grandson Harald Greycloak died in 970. Another example is that King Sverre's claim of being the son of King Sigurd II is disputed by modern scholars.

A normal line indicates a descent that is reasonably certain, whereas a dotted line indicates a claimed descent. In Norway, particularly in the civil war era, such claimed descents were quite common, as many sought the kingship and looked to add legitimacy to their claims.

== Family tree ==
FAIRHAIR
Harald I r. 872–930 lived 849–933
Bjørn Farmann d. 927	Eric I r. 930–934 d. 954	Sigurd Rise; 912–937	Olaf Haraldsson Geirstadalf d. 934	Haakon I 920–934–961	Harald Bluetooth r. 961–980 d. 987	Ålov Haraldsdatter b. Ca. 880	Bergljot Torresdatter
KNÝTLINGA	EARLS OF LADE
Gudrød Bjørnsson d. 968	Harald II r. 961–970	Halfdan Syr; 935–1018	Tryggve Olafsson d. 963	Sweyn Forkbeard; 960–999–1014	Haakon Sigurdsson r. 970/975–995
Harald Grenske b. 957	Åsta Gudbrandsdatter; 977–1025	Sigurd Syr; 970–1018	Olaf I 960–995–1000	Estrid Svendsdatter	Cnut the Great; 985–1028–1035	Gytha	Eiríkr Hákonarson r. 1000–1012	Sveinn Hákonarson r. 1000–1015 d. 1016
Olaf II r. 1015–1028 lived 995–1030	Harald III; 1015–1046–1066	Sweyn II of Denmark; 1019–1074	Svein Knutsson; 1016–1030–1035	Håkon Eiriksson r. 1012–1015, 1028–1029 d. 1029/1030
Magnus I 1024–1035–1047	Magnus II; 1048–1066–1069	Olaf III; 1050–1067–1093	Ingerid of Denmark
Haakon Magnusson; 1068–1093–1094	Magnus III; 1073–1093–1103
Eystein I 1088–1103–1123	Olaf Magnusson; 1099–1103–1115	Sigurd I 1089–1103–1130	Arne Ivarsson	Ingrid Ragnvaldsdotter; 1105–1161	Harald IV; 1103–1130–1136	Sigurd Slembe; 1135–1139
SKAFHØGGR	SKAKKE	KÁRA
Gudbrand Skavhoggsson	Maria Øysteinsdotter	Erling Skakke; 1115–1179	Kristin Sigurdsdatter	Magnus IV r. 1130–1135, 1137–1139 lived 1115–1139	Margrete Arnesdotter	Símon Kárason	Sigurd II; 1133–1136–1155	Magnus Haraldsson c. 1135–1142–c. 1145	Inge I 1135–1136–1161	Eystein II; 1125–1142–1157
GODWIN
Olav Ugjæva; 1166–1168 d. 1169	Magnus V 1156–1161–1184	Haakon II; 1147–1157–1162	Sverre; 1151–1184–1202	Sigurd Markusfostre; 1162–1163	Cecilia Sigurdsdotter d. 1180s	Bård Guttormsson d. 1194	Jon Kuvlung; 1185–1188	Eystein Meyla; 1176–1177
Sigurd Magnusson; 1180–1193–1194	Inge Magnusson; 1196–1202	Erling Steinvegg; 1204–1207	Philip Simonsson; 1207–1217	Christina of Norway; 1190–1209	Haakon III; 1175–1202–1204	Sigurd Lavard; 1170–1200	Inge II; 1185–1204–1217	Skule Bårdsson; 1189–1239–1240
Haakon IV; 1204–1217–1263	Guttorm; 1199–1204–1204
Magnus VI; 1238–1263–1280	Haakon the Young; 1232–1240–1257	Margrete Skulesdatter; 1208–1270
Haakon V 1270–1299–1319	Eric II; 1268–1280–1299
BJÄLBO
Duke Erik Magnusson; 1282–1318	Ingeborg of Norway; 1301–1361
MECKLENBURG	ESTRIDSEN
Albert II, Duke of Mecklenburg; 1318–1378	Euphemia of Sweden; 1317–1370	Valdemar IV of Denmark; 1320–1375	Magnus VII r. 1319–1343 lived 1316–1374
Ingeborg; 1343–1395	Henry III, Duke of Mecklenburg d. 1383	Ingeborg; 1347–1370	Margaret; 1353–1388–1412	Haakon VI; 1340–1343–1380
POMERANIA
Gerhard VI, Count of Holstein-Rendsburg; 1367–1404	Maria of Mecklenburg	Wartislaw VII, Duke of Pomerania	Olaf IV; 1370–1380–1387
OLDENBURG	WITTELSBACH
Hedvig of Holstein; 1398–1436	Dietrich, Count of Oldenburg; 1398–1440	Eric III r. 1389–1442 lived 1381–1459	Catherine Vratislava; 1390–1426	John, Count Palatine of Neumarkt; 1383–1443
Christian I 1426–1450–1481	Dorothea of Brandenburg; 1430–1495	Christopher; 1416–1442–1448	Charles I r. 1449–1450 lived 1409–1470
BONDE
Frederick I 1471–1523–1533	Kristina Karlsdotter; 1432–1500	John; 1455–1483–1513
Erik Eriksson Gyllenstierna d. 1502	Christian II r. 1513–1523 lived 1481–1559
Adolf; 1526–1586	Elizabeth of Denmark; 1524-1586	Christian III; 1503–1537–1559	Karin Eriksdotter Gyllenstierna d. 1562	Christina of Denmark; 1522–1590
Sophie of Mecklenburg-Güstrow; 1557-1631	Frederick II; 1534–1559–1588	John II, Duke of Sonderburg; 1545–1622	Beata Eriksdotter Trolle d. 1591	Renata of Lorraine; 1544–1602
John Adolf; 1575–1616	Christian IV; 1577–1588–1648	Bengt Gabrielsson Oxenstierna d. 1591	Magdalene of Bavaria; 1587–1628
Frederick III; 1597–1659	Frederick III; 1609–1648–1670	Alexander, Duke of Sonderburg; 1573–1627	Gabriel Bengtsson Oxenstierna; 1586–1656	Philip William, Elector Palatine; 1615–1690
Christian Albert; 1641–1695	Princess Frederica Amalia of Denmark; 1649–1704	Christian V 1646–1670–1699	August Philipp, Duke of Beck; 1612–1675	Anna Oxenstierna; 1620–1690	Charles III Philip, Elector Palatine; 1661–1742
HOLSTEIN-GOTTORP
Christian August; 1673–1726	Frederick IV; 1671–1699–1730	Frederick Louis, Duke of Beck; 1653–1728	Countess Amalie Louise of Dohna; 1661–1724	Elisabeth Auguste of Neuburg; 1693–1728
Adolf Frederick; 1710–1771	Christian VI; 1699–1730–1746	Peter August, Duke of Beck; 1697–1775	Albrecht Christoph, Count and Burgrave of Dohna-Schlodien in Leistenau; 1698–1752	Maria Francisca Sulzbach; 1724–1794
Charles II; 1748–1814–1818	Frederick V 1723–1746–1766	Prince Karl Anton August of Beck; 1727–1759	Countess Charlotte of Dohna-Leistenau; 1738–1785	Maximilian I Joseph of Bavaria; 1756–1825
BERNADOTTE
Christian VII; 1749–1766–1808	Frederick; 1753–1805	Princess Louise of Denmark; 1750–1831	Friedrich Karl Ludwig, Duke of Beck; 1757–1816	Charles III John; 1763–1818–1844	Princess Augusta of Bavaria; 1788–1851
Frederick VI r. 1808–1814 lived 1768–1839	Christian Frederik r. 1814 lived 1786–1848	Princess Louise Charlotte of Denmark; 1789–1864	Princess Louise Caroline of Hesse-Kassel; 1789–1867	Friedrich Wilhelm, Duke of Glücksburg; 1785–1831	Oscar I 1799–1844–1859	Josephine of Leuchtenberg; 1807–1876
GLÜCKSBURG
Louise of Hesse-Kassel; 1817–1898	Christian IX of Denmark; 1818–1906	Charles IV; 1826–1859–1872	Oscar II r. 1872–1905 lived 1829–1907
Alexandra of Denmark; 1844–1925	Frederik VIII of Denmark; 1843–1912	Louise of Sweden and Norway; 1851–1926
Maud of Wales; 1869–1938	Haakon VII; 1872–1905–1957	Princess Ingeborg of Denmark; 1878–1958	Prince Carl, Duke of Västergötland; 1861–1951
Olav V 1903–1957–1991	Princess Märtha of Sweden; 1901–1954
Harald V 1937–1991–2026	Queen Sonja of Norway; 1937–present
Queen Mette-Marit of Norway; 1973–present	Haakon VIII; 1973–2026–present
Ingrid Alexandra, Crown Princess of Norway; 2004–present
