= List of monarchs of Norway =

Coat of arms of the King

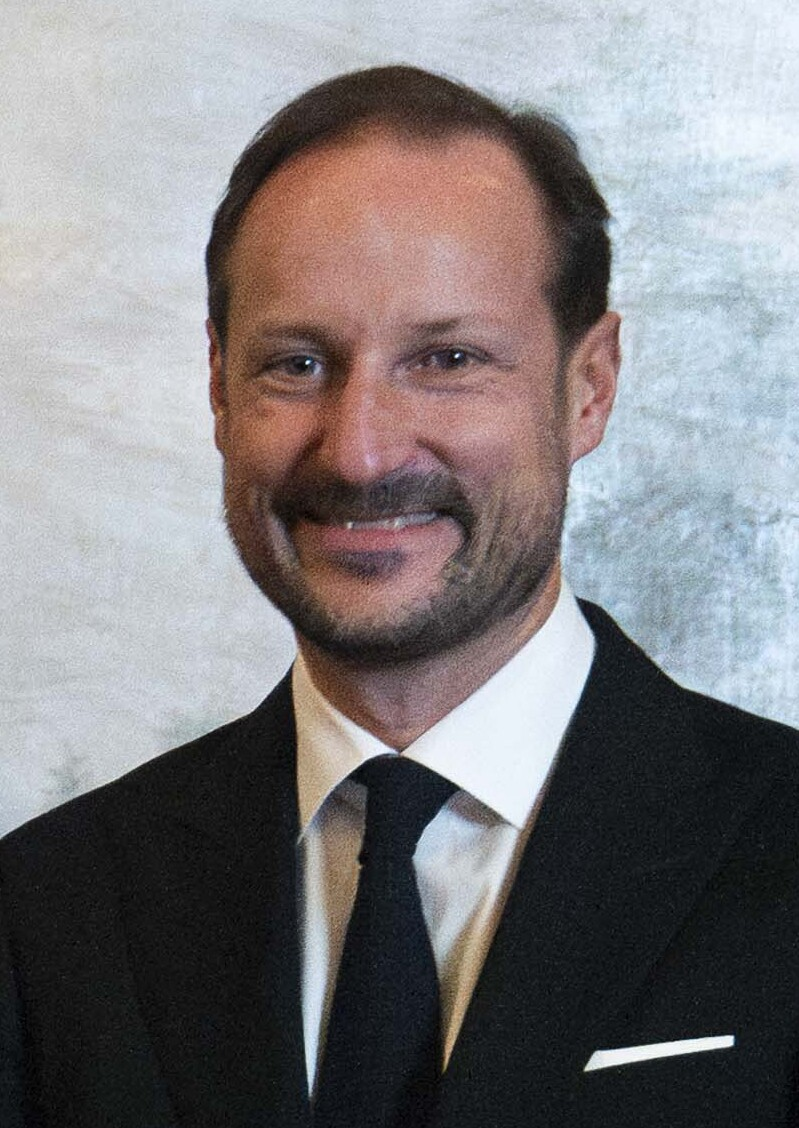
Haakon VIII, the current king of Norway

The list of monarchs of Norway (Norwegian: kongerekken, kongerekkja or kongerekka) begins in 872: the traditional dating of the Battle of Hafrsfjord, after which victorious King Harald Fairhair merged several petty kingdoms into that of his father. Named after the homonymous geographical region, Harald's realm was later to be known as the Kingdom of Norway.

Traditionally established in 872 and existing continuously for over 1,100 years, the Kingdom of Norway is one of the oldest states of Europe. During interregna, Norway has been ruled by variously titled regents. The current monarch is King Haakon VIII, who has reigned since 2026.

Several royal dynasties have possessed the Throne of the Kingdom of Norway: the more prominent include the Fairhair dynasty (872–970), the Hardrada dynasty (1046–1135), the House of Sverre (1184–1319), the House of Oldenburg (1450–1481, 1483–1533, 1537–1818, and from 1905), including branches Holstein-Gottorp (1814–1818) and Glücksburg (from 1905), and the House of Bernadotte (1818–1905). During the civil war era (1130–1240), several pretenders fought each other, and as a consequence, some rulers from this era are not traditionally considered lawful kings and are usually omitted from lists of monarchs. Between 1319 and 1905, Norway was at times part of various unions with neighbouring countries, like The First Swedish–Norwegian union, The Kalmar Union, Denmark–Norway, and Sweden–Norway.

Kings of Norway used many additional titles between 1450 and 1905, such as King of the Wends, King of the Goths, Duke of Schleswig, Duke of Holstein, Prince of Rügen, and Count of Oldenburg. They called themselves Konge til Norge ('King of Norway'), usually with the style "His Royal Majesty". With the introduction of constitutional monarchy in 1814, the traditional style "by the Grace of God" was extended to "by the Grace of God and the Constitution of the Kingdom", but was only briefly in use. The last king to use the by the grace of God style was Haakon VII, who died in 1957. The King's title today is formally Norges Konge ('Norway's King'), with the style "His Majesty".

== Key ==
For lists of the prehistoric kings of Norway see List of legendary kings of Norway

R	Reign
I	Independent period
D	Union with Denmark (1537 – 1814 as Denmark–Norway)
S	Union with Sweden (1814 – 1905 as Sweden–Norway)
DS	Union with Denmark and Sweden (1397 – 1523 as Kalmar Union)
R	Interregnum/Regency

== Fairhair dynasty ==
Besides becoming sole king after his father Harold's death, Eric Bloodaxe was king jointly with his father for three years before the latter's death. After Harald's death, Eric ruled as "overking" of his brothers, who also held status as kings and had control over certain regions. Harald Greycloak also ruled as "overking" of his brothers. All dates for the kings of the Fairhair dynasty are approximate and/or just scholarly estimates. Slight differences might therefore occur between different sources. The following table uses the dates given in Norsk biografisk leksikon/Store norske leksikon.

R	Name Reign	Portrait	Birth	Marriage(s) Issue	Death
I	Harald I Halfdansson; Harald Fairhair c. 872–932	(Non-contemporary)	c. 850/860; Son of Halfdan the Black and Ragnhild	Various; At least nine sons	c. 932; Rogaland
I	Eric I Haraldsson; Eric Bloodaxe c. 932–934		c. 895; Son of Harald I and Ragnhild Eriksdotter	Gunnhild Gormsdóttir; Eight children	c. 952/954; England
I	Haakon I Haraldsson; Haakon the Good c. 934–960	(Non-contemporary)	c. 915–920; Son of Harald I and Tora Mosterstong	Never married	c. 960/961; Håkonshella (near Bergen)
I	Harald II Ericsson; Harald Greycloak c. 961–970	(Non-contemporary)	c. 935; Son of Eric I and Gunnhild Gormsdóttir	Never married	c. 970; Limfjord, Denmark

== House of Gorm/Earl of Lade ==
The Danish king Harald Bluetooth had himself hailed as king of Norway after the Battle of Fitjar (c. 961). Besides gaining direct control of Viken in south-eastern Norway, he let Harald Greycloak rule the rest of Norway as king, nominally under himself. Harald Bluetooth later switched his support to Harald Greycloak's rival, Haakon Sigurdsson, Earl of Lade, who eventually captured Harald Greycloak's kingdom. Haakon thereafter ruled Norway (except Viken), at first nominally under Harald. All dates are estimates and subject to interpretation. Haakon is generally held as the ruler of Norway from 970 to 995.

R	Name Reign	Portrait	Birth	Marriage(s) Issue	Death
D	Harald Bluetooth; 970 – c. 986 (de jure)	(Non-contemporary)	c. 925/35; Son of Gorm the Old and Thyra	Tove of the Obotrites; Four or six children	987 latest Jomsborg
R	Earl Haakon Sigurdsson; 965/70–995 (de facto)	(Non-contemporary)	c. 935; Trondheim; Son of Sigurd Haakonsson and Bergljot Toresdatter	Tora Skagesdatter; Nine children	995; Rimul

== Fairhair dynasty (restored) ==
R	Name Reign	Portrait	Birth	Marriage(s) Issue	Death
I	Olaf I Tryggvason; 995–1000		968; Son of Tryggve Olafsson and Astrid Eiriksdottir	Various	c. 1000; Svolder

== House of Gorm/Earls of Lade (restored) ==
After the Battle of Svolder, the Danes recaptured Norway under Sweyn Forkbeard. As before, the Danes controlled the petty kingdoms of Viken as vassals, while the two Earls of Lade, Eric Haakonsson and Sweyn Haakonsson, ruled Western Norway and Trøndelag, nominally as earls under Sweyn. Eric is generally held as the de facto ruler of Norway from 1000 to 1015, together with his brother Sweyn, a lesser known figure, with whom he shared his power.

R	Name Reign	Portrait	Birth	Marriage(s) Issue	Death
D	Sweyn Forkbeard; 1000–1013 (de jure)		17 April 963; Son of Harald Bluetooth and Tove of the Obotrites	(1 & 2) Gunhild of Wenden or Sigrid the Haughty; Eight or more children	3 February 1014; Gainsborough, Lincolnshire
R	Earl Eric Haakonsson; 1000–1015 (de facto)	(Non-contemporary)	c. 964; Son of Haakon Sigurdsson and Gunhild Mieszcosdatter	Gytha Svendsdatter; One son	c. 1024; England
R	Earl Sweyn Haakonsson; 1000–1015 (de facto)	–	c. 970; Son of Haakon Sigurdsson and Thora Skagesdatter	Holmfrid Eriksdatter; Two daughters	c. 1016; Russia

== St. Olav dynasty ==
R	Name Reign	Portrait	Birth	Marriage(s) Issue	Death
I	Olav II Haraldsson; Saint Olav (Rex Perpetuus Norvegiae); 1015–1028		c. 995; Ringerike; Son of Harald Grenske and Åsta Gudbrandsdatter	Astrid Olofsdotter; One daughter	29 July 1030; Stiklestad; Aged 34–35

== House of Gorm/Earl of Lade (restored, second time) ==
R	Name Reign	Portrait	Birth	Marriage(s) Issue	Death
D	Cnut the Great; 1028–1035 (de jure)		c. 995; Son of Sweyn Forkbeard	(1) Ælfgifu of Northampton; Two children (2) Emma of Normandy; Two children	12 November 1035; Shaftesbury
R	Earl Haakon Ericsson; 1028–1029 (de facto)		c. 998; Son of Eric Haakonsson and Gytha Svendsdatter	Gunhild; One daughter	1029; Pentland Firth
D	Sweyn Knutsson (with Ælfgifu); 1030–1035 (de facto)		c. 1015; Son of Cnut and Ælfgifu of Northampton	Never married	c. 1035

== St. Olav dynasty (restored) ==
R	Name Reign	Portrait	Birth	Marriage(s) Issue	Death
I	Magnus I Olavsson; Magnus the Good; 1035–1047		c. 1024; Illegitimate son of Olaf II and Alfhild	Never married	25 October 1047; Zealand; Aged 23
D	Magnus I Olavsson; Magnus the Good; 1035–1047		c. 1024; Illegitimate son of Olaf II and Alfhild	Never married	25 October 1047; Zealand; Aged 23

== Hardrada dynasty ==
R	Name Reign	Portrait	Birth, parents	Marriage(s) Issue	Death
I	Harald III Sigurdsson; Harald Hardrada; 1046–1066		c. 1015; Son of Sigurd Syr and Åsta Gudbrandsdatter	(1) Elisiv of Kiev; Two daughters (2) Tora Torbergsdatter (bigamously); Two sons	25 September 1066; Stamford Bridge, England; Aged 50–51
I	Magnus II Haraldsson; 1066–1069	–	c. 1049; Eldest son of Harald III and Tora Torbergsdatter	Never married	28 April 1069; Nidaros; Aged 19–20
I	Olav III Haraldsson; Olaf Kyrre; 1067–1093		c. 1050; Youngest son of Harald III and Tora Torbergsdatter	Ingerid of Denmark; No issue	22 September 1093; Haukbø, Rånrike (now Håkeby, Sweden); Aged 42–43
I	Haakon (II) Magnusson; Haakon Toresfostre; 1093–1095	–	c. 1069; Illegitimate son of Magnus II	Never married	1095; Dovrefjell; Aged 25–26
I	Magnus III Olavsson; Magnus Barefoot; 1093–1103		c. 1073; Illegitimate son of Olav III and unknown	Margaret Fredkulla; No issue	24 August 1103; Ulster; Aged 29–30
I	Olav (IV) Magnusson; 1103–1115		c. 1098; Illegitimate son of Magnus III and Sigrid Saxesdatter	Never married	22 December 1115; Nidaros; Aged 16–17
I	Eystein I Magnusson; 1103–1123		c. 1088; Illegitimate son of Magnus III	Ingebjørg Guttormsdatter; Two children	29 August 1123; Hustad, Romsdal; Aged 34–35
I	Sigurd I Magnusson; Sigurd the Crusader; 1103–1130	(Non-contemporary)	c. 1089; Illegitimate son of Magnus III and Tora	(1) Bjaðmunjo Mýrjartaksdóttir; No issue (2) Malmfred of Kiev; One daughter (3) Cecilia; No issue	26 March 1130; Oslo; Aged 40–41
I	Magnus IV Sigurdsson; Magnus the Blind; 1130–1135	–	c. 1115; Illegitimate son of Sigurd I and Borghild Olavsdatter	Christina of Denmark c. 1133; No issue	12 November 1139; Holmengrå; Aged 23–23

== Gille dynasty ==
R	Name Reign	Portrait	Birth, parents	Marriage(s) Issue	Death
I	Harald IV Magnusson; Harald Gille; 1130–1136	–	c. 1102; Ireland/Hebrides; Alleged illegitimate son of Magnus III	Ingrid of Sweden c. 1134; One son	14 December 1136; Bergen; Aged 32–33
I	Sigurd II Haraldsson; Sigurd Munn; 1136–1155	–	c. 1133; Illegitimate son of Harald IV and Thora Guttormsdatter	Never married	10 June 1155; Bergen; Aged 21–22
I	Inge I Haraldsson; Inge the Hunchback; 1136–1161	–	c. 1135; Only son of Harald IV and Ingrid of Sweden	Never married	4 February 1161; Oslo; Aged 25–26
I	Eystein II Haraldsson; 1142–1157	–	c. 1125; Shetland/Orkney/Hebrides; Illegitimate son of Harald IV and Biadoc	Ragna Nikolasdatter; No issue	21 August 1157; Rånrike (now Bohuslän); Aged 31–32
I	Magnus (V) Haraldsson; 1142–1145	–	c. 1135; Illegitimate son of Harald IV	Never married	c. 1145; Norway
I	Haakon II Sigurdsson; Haakon the Broadshouldered; 1157–1162	–	c. 1147; Illegitimate son of Sigurd II and Thora	Never married	7 July 1162; Sekken, Romsdalen; Aged 14–15

== Hardrada dynasty (restored), cognatic branch ==
R	Name Reign	Portrait	Birth, parents	Marriage(s) Issue	Death
I	Magnus V Erlingsson; 1161–1184	–	c. 1156; Son of Erling Skakke and Kristin Sigurdsdatter	Estrid Bjørnsdotter (possible); Two daughters	15 June 1184; Fimreite; Aged 27–28

== Sverre dynasty ==
R	Name Reign	Portrait	Birth, parents	Marriage	Death
I	Sverre Sigurdsson; 1184–1202		c. 1151; Bergen; Alleged illegitimate son of Sigurd II and Gunnhild	Margaret of Sweden; 1185; One daughter	9 March 1202; Bergen; Aged 50–51
I	Haakon III Sverresson; 1202–1204	–	Before 1185; Illegitimate son of Sverre	Never married	1 January 1204; Bergen; Aged 20–21
I	Guttorm Sigurdsson; 1204	–	c. 1199; Illegitimate son of Sigurd Lavard	Never married	11 August 1204; Nidaros; Aged 4–5

== House of Godwin (Gille dynasty, cognatic branch) ==
R	Name	Portrait	Birth	Marriages	Death
I	Inge II Bårdsson; 1204–1217		c. 1185; Rissa; Son of Bård Guttormsson and Cecilia Sigurdsdotter	never married	23 April 1217; Nidaros; Aged 31–32

== Sverre dynasty (restored) ==
R	Name	Portrait	Birth	Marriages	Death
I	Haakon IV Haakonsson; Haakon the Old; 1217–1263		c. 1204; Folkenborg; Illegitimate son of Haakon III and Inga of Varteig	Margaret Skulesdatter; 25 May 1225; Bergen; Four children	16 December 1263; Kirkwall; Aged 58–59
I	Haakon (V) Haakonsson; Haakon the Young; 1240–1257		10 November 1232; Bergen; Second son of Haakon IV and Margaret Skulesdatter	Rikissa Birgersdotter c. 1251; Oslo; One son	5 May 1257; Tønsberg; Aged 24
I	Magnus VI Haakonsson; Magnus the Law-mender; 1257–1280		1 May 1238; Tønsberg; Third son of Haakon IV and Margaret Skulesdatter	Ingeborg of Denmark; 11 September 1261; Bergen; Four sons	9 May 1280; Bergen; Aged 42
I	Eric II Magnusson; 1273–1299 Regent: Queen Mother Ingeborg (1280–1283)		c. 1268; Bergen; Third son of Magnus VI and Ingeborg of Denmark	(1) Margaret of Scotland; September 1281; Bergen; One daughter (2) Isabel Bruce bef. 25 September 1293; Bergen; One daughter	15 July 1299; Bergen; Aged 30–31
I	Haakon V Magnusson Haakon Magnusson the Elder; 1299–1319		10 April 1270; Tønsberg; Fourth son of Magnus VI and Ingeborg of Denmark	(1) Isabelle de Joigny; 1295; No issue (2) Euphemia of Rügen c. 1299; One daughter	8 May 1319; Tunsberg; Aged 49
R	Interregnum (8 May 1319 – August 1319); Ingeborg of Norway as regent				

== House of Bjälbo ==
R	Name	Portrait	Birth	Marriages	Death
S	Magnus VII Eriksson; August 1319 – August 1355 (abdicated, de facto) (circa 24 years, 14 days, de jure); Regents: Queen Mother Ingeborg (1319–1323) and Erling Vidkunsson (1323–1332)	Non-contemporary	c. 1316; Norway; Only son of Duke Erik Magnusson and Ingeborg of Norway	Blanche of Namur; 5 November 1335; Bohus Castle; Two sons	1 December 1374; Lyngholmen; Aged 58
S	Haakon VI Magnusson Haakon Magnusson the Younger; 15 August 1343 – 11 September 1380 (37 years, 27 days)		15 August 1340; Sweden; Second son of Magnus VII and Blanche of Namur	Margaret of Denmark; 9 April 1363; Church of Our Lady; One son	11 September 1380; Akershus Castle; Aged 40
I	Haakon VI Magnusson Haakon Magnusson the Younger; 15 August 1343 – 11 September 1380 (37 years, 27 days)		15 August 1340; Sweden; Second son of Magnus VII and Blanche of Namur	Margaret of Denmark; 9 April 1363; Church of Our Lady; One son	11 September 1380; Akershus Castle; Aged 40
D	Olav IV Haakonsson; 11 September 1380 –23 August 1387 (6 years, 346 days)	Non-contemporary	December 1370; Akershus Castle; Only son of Haakon VI and Margaret I	never married	23 August 1387; Falsterbo Castle; Aged 16
R	Interregnum (23 August 1387 – 2 February 1388); Margaret Estridsen as regent				

== House of Estridsen ==
R	Name	Portrait	Birth	Marriages	Death
DS	Margaret I the Semiramis of the North; 2 February 1388 – 28 October 1412 (24 years, 269 days) with Eric III (1389–1412)	Queen Margaret I	c. 1353; Vordingborg Castle youngest daughter of Valdemar IV and Helvig of Schleswig	Haakon VI of Norway; 9 April 1363; Church of Our Lady; One son	28 October 1412; Ship on Flensburg Fjord; Aged 58–59

== House of Griffin ==
R	Name	Portrait	Birth	Marriages	Death
DS	Eric III; 8 September 1389 – 4 June 1442 (deposed) (52 years, 269 days); Regents: Philippa of England (1423-1425) and Sigurd Jonsson (1439–1442)		c. 1381/82; Rügenwalde Castle; Only son of Wartislaw VII, Duke of Pomerania and Mary of Mecklenburg-Schwerin	Philippa of England; 26 October 1406; Lund Cathedral; No issue	3 May 1459; Rügenwalde Castle; Aged 76–78
I	Eric III; 8 September 1389 – 4 June 1442 (deposed) (52 years, 269 days); Regents: Philippa of England (1423-1425) and Sigurd Jonsson (1439–1442)		c. 1381/82; Rügenwalde Castle; Only son of Wartislaw VII, Duke of Pomerania and Mary of Mecklenburg-Schwerin	Philippa of England; 26 October 1406; Lund Cathedral; No issue	3 May 1459; Rügenwalde Castle; Aged 76–78

== House of Palatinate-Neumarkt ==
R	Name	Portrait	Birth	Marriages	Death
DS	Christopher; 4 June 1442 – 5 January 1448 (5 years, 215 days)		26 February 1416; Neumarkt in der Oberpfalz; Fifth son of John, Count Palatine of Neumarkt and Catherine of Pomerania	Dorothea of Brandenburg; 12 September 1445; Copenhagen; No issue	5 January 1448; Kärnan Castile; Aged 31
R	Interregnum (5 January 1448 – 20 November 1449); Sigurd Jonsson as regent				

== House of Bonde ==
R	Name	Portrait	Birth	Marriages	Death
S	Charles I 20 November 1449 – 13 May 1450 (abdicated/deposed) (174 days)		5 October 1409; Ekholmen Castle; Only son of Knut Tordsson Bonde and Margareta Karlsdotter Sparre	(1) Birgitta Bielke before 1 March 1429; Two children (2) Katarina Gumsehuvud; 5 October 1438; Stockholm; Nine children (3) Christina Abrahamsdotter c. 1470; Stockholm Castle; Two children	14 May 1470; Stockholm Castle; Aged 60

== House of Oldenburg ==
R	Name	Portrait	Birth	Marriages	Death
DS	Christian I 13 May 1450 – 21 May 1481 (31 years, 8 days)		February 1426; Oldenburg; Eldest son of Dietrich, Count of Oldenburg and Hedvig of Holstein	Dorothea of Brandenburg; 28 October 1449; Church of Our Lady; Five children	21 May 1481; Copenhagen Castle; Aged 55
R	Interregnum (21 May 1481 – 20 July 1483); Jon Svaleson Smør as regent				
DS	John; 20 July 1483 – 20 February 1513 (29 years, 215 days)		2 February 1455; Aalborghus Castle; Third son of Christian I and Dorothea of Brandenburg	Christina of Saxony; 6 September 1478; Copenhagen; Five children	20 February 1513; Aalborghus Castle; Aged 58
R	Interregnum (20 February 1513 – 22 July 1513)				
DS	Christian II; 22 July 1513 – 20 January 1523 (deposed) (9 years, 182 days)		1 July 1481; Nyborg Castle; Second son of John and Christina of Saxony	Isabella of Austria; 12 August 1515; Copenhagen; Six children	25 January 1559; Kalundborg Castle; Aged 77
D	Christian II; 22 July 1513 – 20 January 1523 (deposed) (9 years, 182 days)		1 July 1481; Nyborg Castle; Second son of John and Christina of Saxony	Isabella of Austria; 12 August 1515; Copenhagen; Six children	25 January 1559; Kalundborg Castle; Aged 77
R	Interregnum (20 January 1523 – 5 August 1524)				
D	Frederick I 5 August 1524 – 10 April 1533 (8 years, 248 days)		7 October 1471; Haderslevhus Castle; Fourth son of Christian I and Dorothea of Brandenburg	(1) Anna of Brandenburg; 10 April 1502; Stendal; Two children (2) Sophie of Pomerania; 9 October 1518; Kiel Castle; Six children	10 April 1533; Gottorp Castle; Aged 61
R	Interregnum (10 April 1533 – 1 April 1537); Olav Engelbrektsson as regent				
D	Christian III; 1 April 1537 – 1 January 1559 (21 years, 275 days)		12 August 1503; Gottorp Castle; Only son of Frederick I and Anna of Brandenburg	Dorothea of Saxe-Lauenburg; 29 October 1525; Lauenburg Castle; Five children	1 January 1559; Koldinghus Castle; Aged 55
D	Frederick II; 1 January 1559 – 4 April 1588 (29 years, 94 days)		1 July 1534; Haderslevhus Castle; Eldest son of Christian III and Dorothea of Saxe-Lauenburg	Sophie of Mecklenburg-Güstrow; 20 July 1572; Copenhagen; Eight children	4 April 1588; Antvorskov Castle; Aged 53
D	Christian IV; 4 April 1588 – 28 February 1648 (59 years, 330 days); Regency Council led by: Niels Kaas (1588–1594) and Jørgen Rosenkrantz (1594–1596)		12 April 1577; Frederiksborg Palace; Eldest son of Frederick II and Sophie of Mecklenburg-Güstrow	(1) Anne Catherine of Brandenburg; 27 November 1597; Haderslevhus Castle; Seven children (2) Kirsten Munk; 31 December 1615; Copenhagen; Twelve children	28 February 1648; Rosenborg Castle; Aged 70
R	Interregnum (28 February 1648 – 6 July 1648); Hannibal Sehested as Governor-general				
D	Frederick III; 6 July 1648 – 9 February 1670 (21 years, 218 days)		18 March 1609; Haderslevhus Castle; Third son of Christian IV and Anne Catherine of Brandenburg	Sophie Amalie of Brunswick-Lüneburg; 1 October 1643; Glücksburg Castle; Eight children	9 February 1670; Copenhagen Castle; Aged 60
D	Christian V 9 February 1670 – 25 August 1699 (29 years, 197 days)		15 April 1646; Duborg Castle; Eldest son of Frederick III and Sophie Amalie of Brunswick-Lüneburg	Charlotte Amalie of Hesse-Kassel; 25 June 1667; Nykøbing Castle; Eight children	25 August 1699; Copenhagen Castle; Aged 53
D	Frederick IV; 25 August 1699 – 12 October 1730 (31 years, 48 days); Regent: Queen Consort Louise (1708–1709)		11 October 1671; Copenhagen Castle; Eldest son of Christian V and Charlotte Amalie of Hesse-Kassel	(1) Louise of Mecklenburg-Güstrow; 5 December 1695; Copenhagen; Five children (2) Elisabeth Helene von Vieregg; 6 September 1703; One son (3) Anne Sophie Reventlow; 4 April 1721; Copenhagen; Three children	12 October 1730; Odense Palace; Aged 59
D	Christian VI; 12 October 1730 – 6 August 1746 (15 years, 298 days)		30 November 1699; Copenhagen Castle; Second son of Frederick IV and Louise of Mecklenburg-Güstrow	Sophia Magdalene of Brandenburg-Kulmbach; 7 August 1721; Pretzsch Castle; Three children	6 August 1746; Hirschholm Palace; Aged 46
D	Frederick V 6 August 1746 – 14 January 1766 (19 years, 161 days)		31 March 1723; Copenhagen Castle; Only son of Christian VI and Sophia Magdalene of Brandenburg-Kulmbach	(1) Louise of Great Britain; 11 December 1743; Altona; Five children (2) Juliana Maria of Brunswick-Wolfenbüttel; 8 July 1752; Frederiksborg Palace; One son	14 January 1766; Christiansborg Palace; Aged 42
D	Christian VII; 14 January 1766 – 13 March 1808 (42 years, 59 days); Regents: Hereditary Prince Frederick (1772–1784) and Crown Prince Frederick (1784–1808)		29 January 1749; Christiansborg Palace; Second son of Frederick V and Louise of Great Britain	Caroline Matilda of Great Britain; 8 November 1766; Christiansborg Palace; Two children	13 March 1808; Rendsburg; Aged 59
D	Frederick VI; 13 March 1808 – 7 February 1814 (abdicated) (5 years, 331 days)		28 January 1768; Christiansborg Palace; Only son of Christian VII and Caroline Matilda of Great Britain	Marie Sophie of Hesse-Kassel; 31 July 1790; Gottorp Castle; Eight children	3 December 1839; Amalienborg Palace; Aged 71
R	Interregnum (7 February 1814 – 17 May 1814); Hereditary Prince Christian Frederick as regent				
I	Christian Frederick; 17 May 1814 – 10 October 1814 (abdicated) (146 days)		18 September 1786; Christiansborg Palace; Eldest son of Frederick, Hereditary Prince of Denmark and Norway and Sophia Frederica of Mecklenburg-Schwerin	(1) Charlotte Frederica of Mecklenburg-Schwerin; 21 June 1806; Ludwigslust Castle; Two sons (2) Caroline Amalie of Schleswig-Holstein-Sonderburg-Augustenburg; 22 May 1815; Augustenborg Palace; No issue	20 January 1848; Amalienborg Palace; Aged 61
R	Interregnum (10 October 1814 – 4 November 1814); Marcus Gjøe Rosenkrantz as Prime Minister				

== House of Holstein-Gottorp ==
R	Name	Portrait	Birth	Marriages	Death
S	Charles II; 4 November 1814 – 5 February 1818 (3 years, 93 days); Regent: Crown Prince Charles John Bernadotte		7 October 1748; Stockholm Palace; Second son of Adolf Frederick of Sweden and Louisa Ulrika of Prussia	Hedvig Elisabeth Charlotte of Holstein-Gottorp; 7 July 1774; Stockholm Cathedral; Two children	5 February 1818; Stockholm Palace; Aged 69

== House of Bernadotte ==
R	Name	Portrait	Birth	Marriages	Death
S	Charles III John; 5 February 1818 – 8 March 1844 (26 years, 32 days)		26 January 1763; Pau; Son of Jean Henri Bernadotte and Jeanne de Saint Vincent; Adopted by Charles II on 21 August 1810	Désirée Clary; 17 August 1798; Sceaux; One son	8 March 1844; Stockholm Palace; Aged 81
S	Oscar I 8 March 1844 – 8 July 1859 (15 years, 122 days); Regent: Crown Prince Charles (1857–1859)		4 July 1799; Paris; Only son of Charles III John and Désirée Clary	Josephine of Leuchtenberg; 19 June 1823; Stockholm Cathedral; Five children	8 July 1859; Stockholm Palace; Aged 60
S	Charles IV; 8 July 1859 – 18 September 1872 (13 years, 102 days)		3 May 1826; Stockholm Palace; Eldest son of Oscar I and Josephine of Leuchtenberg	Louise of the Netherlands; 19 June 1850; Stockholm Cathedral; Two children	18 September 1872; Malmö; Aged 46
S	Oscar II; 18 September 1872 – 7 June (deposed) or 26 October 1905 (abdicated) (32 years, 262 days or 33 years, 38 days)		21 January 1829; Stockholm Palace; Third son of Oscar I and Josephine of Leuchtenberg	Sophia of Nassau; 6 June 1857; Biebrich Palace; Four children	8 December 1907; Stockholm Palace; Aged 78
R	Dissolution of the Union (7 June 1905 – 26 October 1905); Interregnum (26 October 1905 – 18 November 1905); Christian Michelsen as Prime Minister				

== House of Glücksburg ==
Carl of Denmark was approved in a referendum as King of Norway on 13 November 1905 and then elected by the Storting on 18 November 1905. He took the regnal name Haakon VII. With him the House of Oldenburg, in the form of its junior branch, resumed occupancy of the throne of Norway.

R	Name	Portrait	Birth	Marriages	Death
I	Haakon VII; 18 November 1905 – 21 September 1957 (51 years, 307 days); Regent: Crown Prince Olav (1955 – 1957)		3 August 1872; Charlottenlund, Denmark; Second son of Frederik VIII of Denmark and Louise of Sweden	Maud of Wales; 22 July 1896; 1 son	21 September 1957; Oslo (85 years, 49 days)
I	Olav V 21 September 1957 – 17 January 1991 (33 years, 118 days); Regent: Crown Prince Harald (1958, 1990 – 1991)		2 July 1903; Norfolk, United Kingdom; Only child of Haakon VII and Maud of Wales	Märtha of Sweden; 21 March 1929; 3 children	17 January 1991; Oslo (87 years, 199 days)
I	Harald V 17 January 1991 – 28 August 2026 (35 years, 223 days); Regent: Crown Prince Haakon (2003 – 2004, 2005, 2020, 2024, 2026)		21 February 1937; Asker; Only son of Olav V and Märtha of Sweden	Sonja Haraldsen; 29 August 1968; 2 children	28 August 2026; Oslo (89 years, 188 days)
I	Haakon VIII; 28 August 2026 – present (85 days)		20 July 1973; Oslo; Only son and second child of Harald V and Sonja Haraldsen	Mette-Marit Tjessem Høiby; 25 August 2001; 2 children	Alive (53 years, 124 days)

== See also ==
- Family tree of Norwegian monarchs
- Succession to the Norwegian throne
- List of Norwegian royal consorts
- Coronations in Norway
- Regalia of Norway
- Royal mottos of Norwegian monarchs
- Orders of chivalry of Norway
- List of heads of government of Norway
- Lists of office-holders
