= 1161 =

1161 in various calendars
- Gregorian calendar: 1161; MCLXI
- Ab urbe condita: 1914
- Armenian calendar: 610; ԹՎ ՈԺ
- Assyrian calendar: 5911
- Balinese saka calendar: 1082–1083
- Bengali calendar: 567–568
- Berber calendar: 2111
- English Regnal year: 7 Hen. 2 – 8 Hen. 2
- Buddhist calendar: 1705
- Burmese calendar: 523
- Byzantine calendar: 6669–6670
- Chinese calendar: 庚辰年 (Metal Dragon); 3858 or 3651 — to — 辛巳年 (Metal Snake); 3859 or 3652
- Coptic calendar: 877–878
- Discordian calendar: 2327
- Ethiopian calendar: 1153–1154
- Hebrew calendar: 4921–4922
- Hindu calendars
- Vikram Samvat: 1217–1218
- Shaka Samvat: 1082–1083
- Kali Yuga: 4261–4262
- Holocene calendar: 11161
- Igbo calendar: 161–162
- Iranian calendar: 539–540
- Islamic calendar: 555–557
- Japanese calendar: Eiryaku 2 / Ōhō 1 (応保元年)
- Javanese calendar: 1067–1068
- Julian calendar: 1161; MCLXI
- Korean calendar: 3494
- Minguo calendar: 751 before ROC 民前751年
- Nanakshahi calendar: −307
- Seleucid era: 1472/1473 AG
- Thai solar calendar: 1703–1704
- Tibetan calendar: ལྕགས་ཕོ་འབྲུག་ལོ་ (male Iron-Dragon); 1287 or 906 or 134 — to — ལྕགས་མོ་སྦྲུལ་ལོ་ (female Iron-Snake); 1288 or 907 or 135

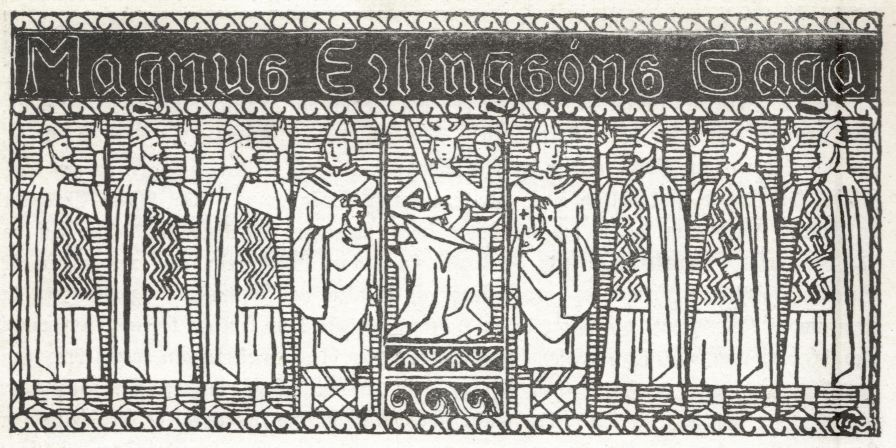
King Magnus V (middle) (1156–1184)

Year 1161 (MCLXI) was a common year starting on Sunday of the Julian calendar.

== Events ==
=== By place ===
==== Byzantine Empire ====
- December 24 – The widowed Emperor Manuel I Komnenos marries Maria of Antioch, aged 16, at Hagia Sophia.

==== Europe ====
- February 3 – Battle of Oslo: King Inge I of Norway ("the Hunchback") is defeated and killed while fighting the forces of Haakon II ("the Broadshouldered") who succeeds Inge, with 5-year-old Magnus V as co-ruler, but not without challenges to his sovereignty.
- late summer/early autumn – Géza II of Hungary and the envoys of Pope Alexander III conclude the Concordat of 1161, by which Géza agrees to support the Pope in exchange for concessions.
- Magnus Henriksson, pretender to the throne of Sweden, is murdered by Charles VII, who becomes king of Sweden until 1167.
- An Almoravid offensive against the Kingdom of Portugal reaches the city of Almada, located on the Tagus river.

==== Asia ====
- Jin–Song Wars: The Battle of Tangdao (November 16) and Battle of Caishi (November 26–27) on the Yangtze River, between the Jin dynasty and the Song dynasty in China result in two pivotal Song naval victories.
- December 15 – Wanyan Liang, Chinese prince of Hailing, is assassinated while on campaign. He is succeeded by Emperor Shizong of Jin (until 1189).

=== By topic ===
==== Religion ====
- January 5 – Canonization of Edward the Confessor (d. 1066) in England.
- April 18 – Theobald of Bec, archbishop of Canterbury in England dies after an illness. King Henry II is informed and expresses the wish to have his friend Thomas Becket elected as the successor.
- after April 18 – Bartholomew is consecrated as bishop of Exeter in England (until 1184).
- The Cross of Saint Euphrosyne, commissioned by Euphrosyne of Polotsk in Belarus, is created by craftsman Lazar Bohsha. (It goes missing during World War II, and is not recovered subsequently).

== Births ==
- February 22 – Innocent III, pope of the Catholic Church (d. 1216)
- September 20 – Takakura, emperor of Japan (d. 1181)
- Alfonso Téllez de Meneses, Spanish nobleman (d. 1230)
- Baldwin IV ("the Leper"), king of Jerusalem (d. 1185)
- Beatrice of Albon, duchess of Burgundy (d. 1228)
- Belgutei, half-brother of Genghis Khan (d. 1271)
- Börte, wife of Genghis Khan (approximate date)
- Constance, duchess of Brittany (approximate date)
- Da'ud Abu al-Fadl, Ayyubid physician (d. 1242)
- Eleanor of England, queen of Castile (d. 1214)
- Guðmundur Arason, Icelandic bishop (d. 1237)
- Sancho, Count of Provence (or Sanche), Spanish nobleman (d. 1223)
- Sasaki Yoshikiyo, Japanese nobleman (d. 1242)
- Satō Tadanobu, Japanese samurai (d. 1186)
- Tsangpa Gyare, Tibetan Buddhist leader (d. 1211)

== Deaths ==
- February 3 – Inge I ("the Hunchback"), king of Norway (b. 1135)
- April 18 – Theobald of Bec, archbishop of Canterbury (b. 1090)
- May 12 – Fergus of Galloway, Scottish nobleman
- June 14 – Qinzong, Chinese emperor (b. 1100)
- September 10 – Tala'i ibn Ruzzik, Fatimid vizier
- September 11 – Melisende, queen of Jerusalem (b. 1105)
- October 12 – Henry V, duke of Carinthia (House of Sponheim)
- October 28 – Imar of Tusculum, French abbot and bishop
- November 21 – William III, count of Nevers and Auxerre
- November 23 – Adam of Ebrach, German monk and abbot
- December 15 – Wanyan Liang, Chinese emperor (b. 1122)
- Akarius Fitz Bardolph, English nobleman and knight
- Hu Hong, Chinese scholar and philosopher (b. 1105)
- Magnus Henriksson, king of Sweden (b. 1130)
- Rechung Dorje Drakpa, Tibetan Buddhist leader
- Roger IV, duke of Apulia and Calabria (b. 1152)
