= Ragnhild Skoftesdotter =

Ragnhild Skoftesdotter (12th century) was a Norwegian noblewoman and landowner.

== Life ==
Ragnhild Skoftesdotter was a daughter of Skofte Ogmundsson (ca. 1040–1103) who was a leading member of the Giske family (Giskeætten) from the island of Giske in Sunnmøre and the cousin of King Olav Kyrre who ruled Norway from 1067 until his death in 1093.

Ragnhild Skoftesdotter was married to Dag Eilivsson who was associated with the founding of Gimsøy Abbey. They were the parents of several children, among them Baugeid Dagsdatter. The family resided on the Bratsberg farm (Bratsberg gaard i Gjerpen) in Gjerpen (now in Skien Municipality in Telemark).

Ragnhild Skoftesdotter lived just prior to the beginning of the civil war era in Norway. During a portion of that time, Norway was ruled jointly by three half-brothers; Inge, Sigurd and Eystein. All three were recognized as sons of King Harald Gille and joint heirs to the throne of Norway. This arrangement ultimately resulted in a power-struggle pitting brother against brother.

Ragnhild Skoftesdotter was the mother of two sons (Vatnorm Dagsson and Gregorius Dagsson) both of whom would play key roles within this power-struggle as supporter in the cause of King Inge.
