= Sigurd of Norway =

Sigurd of Norway may refer to:

- Sigurd Syr
- Sigurd I of Norway
- Sigurd II of Norway
- Sigurd Lavard
- Sigurd Slembe
- Sigurd Magnusson
- Sigurd Markusfostre
- Sigurd Ribbung
