= Battle of Oslo (1161) =

Battle during the 12th c. Norwegian civil wars

- Part of the Civil war era in Norway
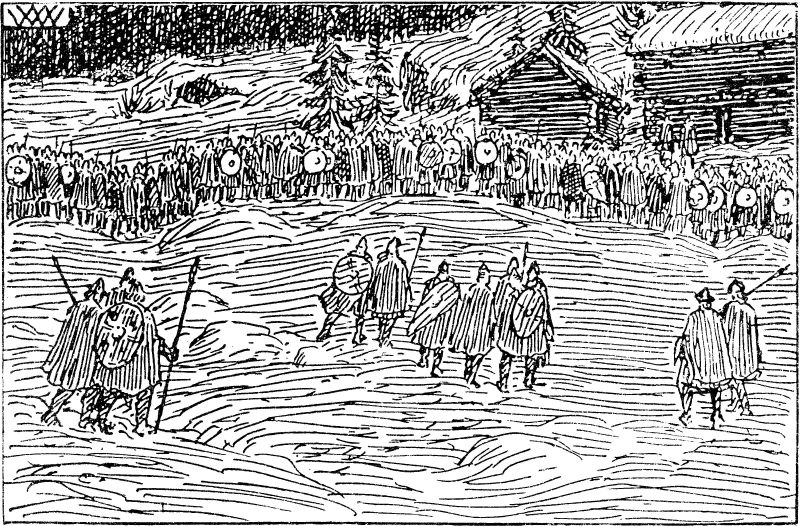
- King Inge's army at the battle of Oslo in 1161, as imagined by artist Wilhelm Wetlesen in the 1899 edition of Heimskringla.
Date	3 February 1161
Location	Oslo
Result	King Haakon victory, Inge killed

The Battle of Oslo was fought outside of Oslo on the night of 3 February 1161 between Haakon II of Norway and Inge I of Norway during the civil war era in Norway. As the son of Ingiríðr Ragnvaldsdóttir and king Harald Gille (making him the only legitimate son of Gille), Inge had been named king of Norway after Gille was killed by Sigurd Slembe. His two half-brothers, Magnus and Sigurd, were also named kings around the same time, and the three ruled Norway. By 1157, Inge's brothers were both dead, and he was the sole remaining ruler of Norway. Haakon II, an illegitimate son of Gille, then contested Inge's rule, and at the Battle of Oslo Inge was killed. According to the Heimskringla, Inge had 4,800 men.
