= Fairhair dynasty =

Medieval European dynasty

Fairhair dynasty Hårfagreætta
- Norse clan (Ætt); Royal dynasty
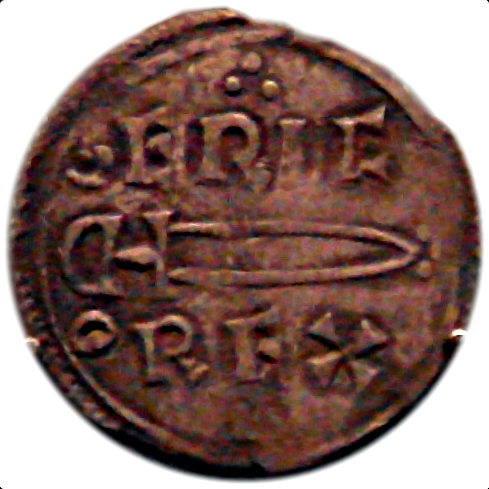
- Coin of Eric Bloodaxe
- Country: Norway
- Origin: Norwegian
- Founded: c. 865
- Founder: Harald Fairhair
- Final ruler: Olaf Tryggvason, Magnus V, or Haakon V (Norway); Margaret (Scotland, disputed)
- Titles: King of Vestfold; King of Norway; King of Northumbria; King of Denmark; King of Rånrike; King of Trondheim; King of Vingulmark
- Dissolution: 970 or 1387
- Cadet branches: Viken branch; Vestfold branch; Allegedly: Hardrada dynasty; Gille dynasty (illegitimate; dubious); Sverre dynasty (illegitimate; dubious)

The Fairhair dynasty (Norwegian: Hårfagreætta) was a family of kings founded by Harald I of Norway (commonly known as "Harald Fairhair", Haraldr inn hárfagri) which united and ruled Norway with few interruptions from the latter half of the 9th century. In the traditional view, this lasted until 1387, however, some modern scholars view this rule as lasting only three generations, ending with Harald Greycloak in the late 10th century. The moniker "Fairhair dynasty" is a retrospective construction: in their lifetime what little traces there are refer to them consistently as "Ynglings".

== Dynasty itself: traditional view vs artificial construct ==
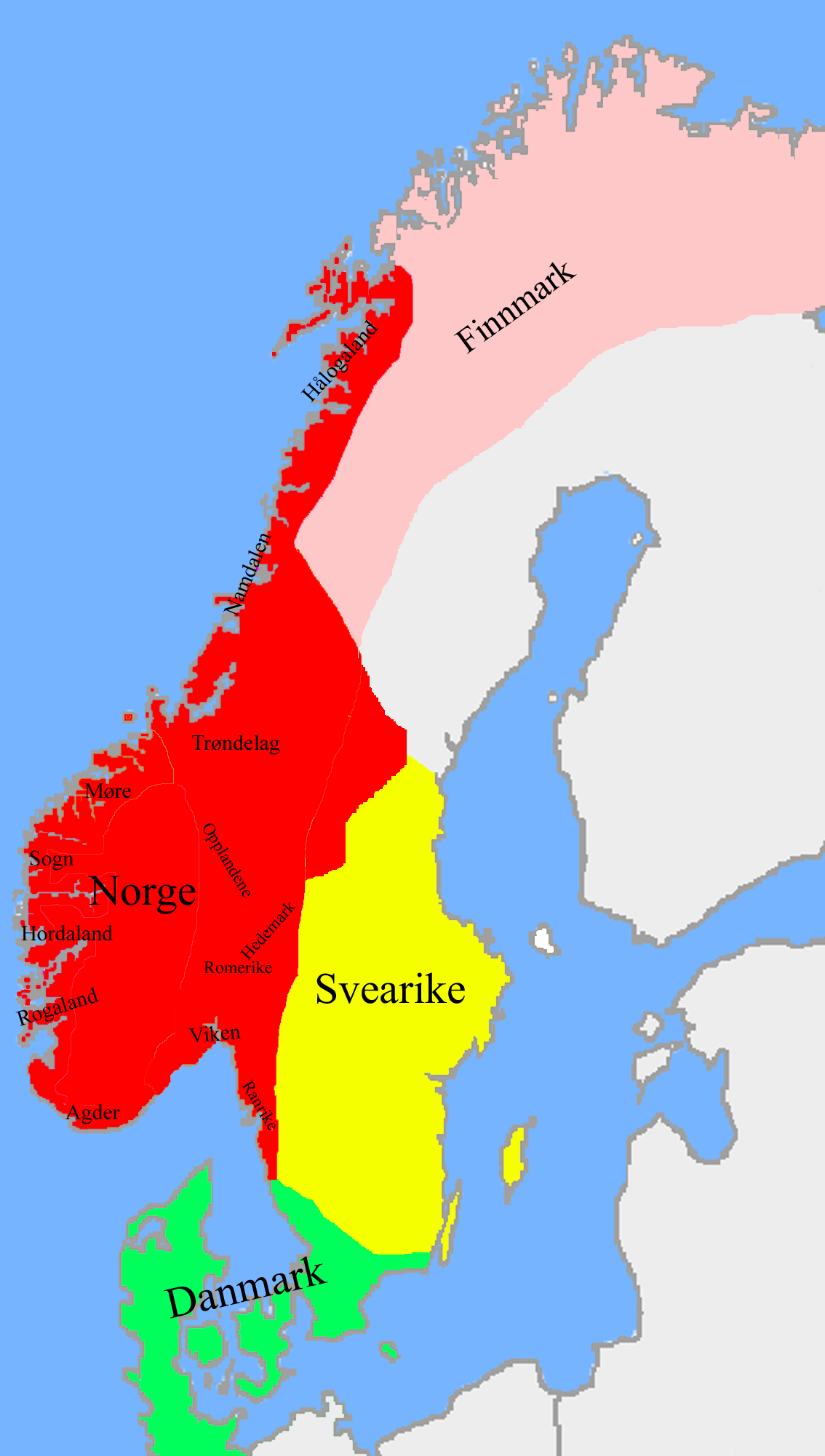
Kingdom of Norway (red) in 1020, with the territory of Finnmark

The Fairhair dynasty is traditionally regarded as the first royal dynasty of the united kingdom of Norway. It was founded by Harald I of Norway, known as Haraldr hinn hárfagri (Harald Fairhair or Finehair), the first King of Norway (as opposed to "in Norway"), who defeated the last resisting petty kings at the Battle of Hafrsfjord in 872.

According to the traditional view, after Harald Fairhair first unified the kingdom, Norway was inherited by his agnatic (male) descendants. In the 13th century, this was codified in law. Unlike other Scandinavian monarchies and Anglo-Saxon England, Norway was never an elective monarchy.

However, in the first centuries after Harald Fairhair, there were several periods during which the country was effectively ruled not by a king but by one of the Jarls of Lade, (Old Norse Hlaðir), from the northern part of Norway. The first such period was from about 975 to about 995 under Haakon Sigurdsson (Hákon Sigurðarson, often called 'Jarl Haakon'). Also, although Harald Fairhair's kingdom was the kernel of a unified Norway, it was still small and his power centre was in Vestfold, in the south. And when he died, the kingdom was divided between his sons. Some historians put emphasis on the actual monarchical control over the country and assert that Olaf II (Olaf the Stout, who later became St. Olaf), who reigned from 1015, was the first king to have control over the entire country. He is generally held to be the driving force behind Norway's final conversion to Christianity and was later revered as Rex Perpetuum Norvegiæ (Latin: eternal king of Norway). Some provinces did not actually come under the rule of the Fairhair kings before the time of Harald III (Harald Hardrada, r. 1046–1066). Either of these may therefore be regarded as further unifiers of Norway. And some of the rulers were nominally or actually vassals of the King of Denmark, including Jarl Haakon.

It is undisputed that later kings, until Magnus IV (Magnus the Blind, r. 1130–1135 and 1137–1139), were descended from Harald Hardrada: the 'Hardrada dynasty'. However, some modern historians doubt whether Harald III or his predecessors Olaf Tryggvason, Olaf II and Magnus the Good were in fact descended from Harald Fairhair (for example questioning the identification of Halfdan in Hadafylke with the father of Sigurd Syr or Harald Fairhair's fathering of Sigurd Hrise on a Sami girl called Snæfrithr Svásadottir) and whether they in fact made such a claim, or whether these lineages are a construction from the 12th century. Sverre Sigurdsson's claim to be the son of Sigurd Munn is also usually considered to be dubious, which would make Inge II (Inge Bårdsson) possibly the last king of a dynasty.

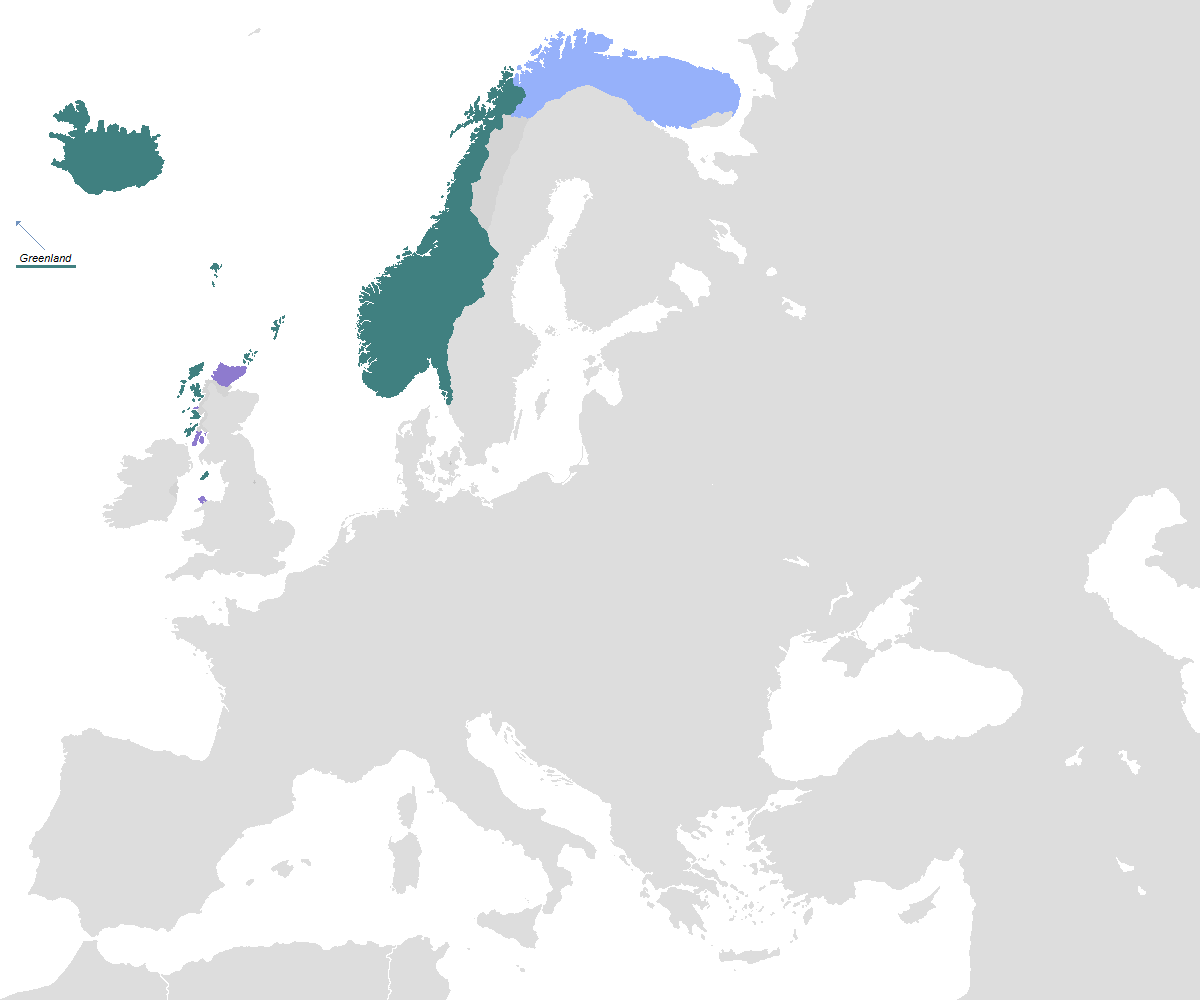
Kingdom of Norway at its greatest extent, around 1265

Scholars now consider the Fairhair dynasty at least partly the product of medieval invention. One motive would be to increase the legitimacy of rulers by giving them a clear royal ancestry dating back to the foundation of the kingdom. Another was to provide pedigrees for other people by connecting them to the royal house. Versions of the royal descent are preserved in various works by Icelandic skalds and historians, some based on now lost works: Þjóðólfr of Hvinir's Ynglingatal, in Nóregs konungatal (which preserves information from a lost work by Sæmundr fróði), and at greatest length in Snorri Sturluson's Heimskringla (which preserves information from a now lost version of Ari Þorgilsson's Íslendingabók). These differ in some respects. Joan Turville-Petre explored the relationship between them and argued that the original aims were to establish a framework of regnal years for dating and to connect Icelandic chieftains to them, and that the Vestfold origin of the dynasty was deliberately altered and they were connected to the Swedish Ynglings rather than the Skjǫldungs to fit Icelandic tradition. Claus Krag argued that an important motive was to establish a hereditary claim to Viken, the region around Oslo, because the area had been paying taxes to the King of Denmark.

Turville-Petre speaks of a "decisive reconstruction of Harald [Hardrada]'s ancestry probably carried out by Icelanders, some two hundred years after his time" which made Halfdan the Black the progenitor of a dynasty which stretched in three branches from Harald Fairhair to Olaf Tryggvason, Olaf II and Harald. – in fulfillment of prophetic dreams, according to Heimskringla, in which the genealogy reaches its full form.

One particular point of doubt raised by historians is whether Harald III's father was actually descended in unbroken male line from a younger (and somewhat obscure) son of Harald Fairhair, and Olav II in another obscure but unbroken male line. It has been suggested that their claims to the throne were bolstered by genealogical invention because although they shared the same mother, Åsta Gudbrandsdatter, the mother's descent was unimportant in inheritance according to traditional Germanic law.

In this critical view, only three generations of Fairhair kings reigned, from 930 to 1030, for 40 years altogether. The kings Olav Tryggvason and St. Olav, their family ties with the Fairhair dynasty perhaps a 12th-century invention, ruled for 18 years altogether and Harald Hardrada then founded a new dynasty. There may be as many as 6 dynasties altogether subsumed under the title of Fairhair dynasty: Harald Fairhair's, Olaf Tryggvason's, St. Olaf's, Harald Hardrada's, Magnus Erlingsson's and Sverre's.

== Genealogy ==
The problem points (points of broken genealogy) in the medieval royal lineage in the so-called Fairhair dynasty are:

- whether either Olaf I of Norway or Olaf II of Norway descended from Harald I of Norway (Harald Fairhair)
- whether Harald III of Norway descended from Harald I
- whether Harald IV of Norway was son of King Magnus III of Norway
- whether King Sverre was son of King Sigurd II of Norway,
- whether Haakon IV of Norway was son of King Haakon III

Each of them came from "nowhere" and won the kingdom, the three latter claiming to be hitherto unknown natural sons of an earlier king.

Olaf I is given a male-line descent from Harald I in the Icelandic sagas, as grandson of Harald's alleged son Olaf in Vika. However, Viken and its region of Norway, Vestfold, were not parts of Harald I's dominions but subject to the Danish kings at the time, making this connection dubious. Further, the future king Olaf is said to have been born posthumously to a mother who had taken refuge in the Orkney Islands, yet the age assigned him in other sources would place his birth years after the date attributed to the death of his father. The Heimskringla then relates that he was enslaved in Estonia as a three-year-old, only to tell his true parentage to the man who discovered him there and freed him six years later. Olaf II is likewise claimed to have been a male-line descendant of Harald I, as great-grandson of Harald I's alleged son Bjørn in Vestfold, yet he is first known to history as a successful Viking marauder rather than a landed prince. The reliability of these two claims depends on the credibility of the Icelandic accounts (in particular Heimskringla) and the sources used to compile them, and if deemed unreliable, their reigns would represent distinct dynasties from that of Fairhair. Irrespective of the disputed connection to Harald Fairhair, Olaf II has descendants through his daughter Ulvhild; the present Norwegian royal family can trace its descent from her.

Harald III is historically attested to have referred only to his kinship with his maternal half-brother, Olaf II. Much later legends (sagas authored under the patronage of royal courts of Harald III's descendants) claim Harald III's father also to have descended from Harald I (through Harald Fairhair's alleged son Sigurd Hrise). Thus, Harald III's 'Hardrada dynasty' is represented in the sagas as a branch of the Fairhair dynasty. They also became known as the 'St. Olaf dynasty' in honor of the founder's half-brother.

Harald IV arrived in Norway from his native Ireland and claimed to be the natural son of Magnus III, sired during the latter's Irish expedition. His claim seems, from historical sources, to be based on tales told by his Irish mother and family circle during his youth. Were one to view these claims as dubious, then Harald IV instead gave rise to a new dynasty, the 'Gille' (Irish) or 'Gylle dynasty'.

The most discredited alleged scion, practically regarded as an impostor by multiple modern academics, was Sverre I, who arrived in Norway from his native Faroe Islands, took up leadership in the embattled and heirless Birkebeiner party of the civil war, and claimed to be the natural son of Sigurd II by Gunhild, Sverre's attested mother. Sverre was sired during his mother's marriage with another man, Unas the Combmaker. Only in adulthood, so the claim goes according to legends, did his mother tell Sverre his 'real' paternity. Based on historical sources, no one else appears to have given the story credence. During that stage of the civil war, the strife was so intense that genealogical truth had evolved to a relative concept. A number of royal pretenders claimed to be sons of King Sigurd II, and that was mostly a political statement – their claims were at best dubious. It may have meant just that the claimant desired to continue the perceived policies of Sigurd and his party, and in that sense were his 'sons'. Sverre I would be viewed as starting the Sverre dynasty.

Haakon IV was born to a Norwegian peasant girl after the death of King Haakon III. She and the late king's inner circle affirmed that she had been the king's lover and that the boy had been sired by him. Of all the last-mentioned four problematic points of descent, this appears, on the face of it, as the most trustworthy. Were this disputed, Haakon IV, would be regarded as having started yet another new dynasty, though he is generally regarded as having continued the 'Sverre dynasty'.

=== Kings and pretenders in sub-dynasties ===
Original Fairhair lineage:

- Harald I of Norway (Harald Fairhair; Harald Hårfagre): c. 890 – c. 930
- Eric I of Norway (Eric Bloodaxe; Eirik Blodøks): c. 930–934
- Haakon I of Norway (Haakon the Good; Håkon den Gode): 934–961
- Harald II of Norway (Harald Greyfur; Harald Gråfell): 961–976

Viken, perhaps an unrelated Tryggvason dynasty:

- Olaf I of Norway (Olaf Tryggvason): 995–1000

Vestfold, the beginning of the St. Olav dynasty:

- Olaf II of Norway (Olaf Haraldsson; Olav the Stout, St. Olav; Olav Digre, Sankt Olav, Olav den Hellige): 1015–1028
- Magnus I of Norway (Magnus the Good; Magnus den Gode): 1035–1047

Hardrada dynasty:

- Harald III of Norway (Harald Hardrada; Harald Hardråde): 1046–1066
- Magnus II of Norway (Magnus Haraldsson): 1066–1069
- Olaf III of Norway (Olaf the Peaceful; Olav Kyrre): 1066–1093
- Haakon Magnusson (Håkon Magnusson): 1093–1094
- Magnus III of Norway (Magnus Bareleg; Magnus Berrføtt): 1093–1103
- Olaf Magnusson: 1103–1115
- Eystein I of Norway (Øystein Magnusson): 1103–1123
- Sigurd I of Norway (Sigurd the Crusader; Sigurd Jorsalfare): 1103–1130
- Magnus IV of Norway (Magnus the Blind; Magnus Blinde): 1130–1135
  - Sigurd Slembe (Sigurd the Noisy): 1135–1139, rival king
- Magnus V of Norway (Magnus Erlingsson): 1161–1184
  - Olav Ugjæva: 1166–1169, rival king
  - Sigurd Magnusson: 1193–1194, rival king
  - Inge Magnusson: 1196–1202, rival king
  - Erling Steinvegg (Erling Stonewall): 1204–1207, rival king

Gille dynasty:

- Harald IV of Norway (Harald Gille): 1130–1136
- Sigurd II of Norway (Sigurd Munn): 1136–1155
- Eystein II of Norway (Øystein Haraldsson): 1142–1157
- Inge I of Norway (Inge the Hunchback; Inge Krokrygg): 1136–1161
- Haakon II of Norway (Haakon Broadshoulder; Håkon Herdebreid): 1157–1162
  - Sigurd Markusfostre: 1162–1163, rival king
  - Eystein Meyla (Eystein the Maiden; Øystein Møyla): 1174–1177, rival king
  - Jon Kuvlung: 1185–1188, rival king
- Inge II of Norway (Inge Bårdsson): 1204–1217

Philip Simonsson and Skule Baardsson cannot easily be placed within the Fairhair dynasty scheme, as their relationship to earlier Fairhair kings was through half-siblings.

Sverre dynasty:

- Sverre of Norway (Sverre Sigurdsson): 1177–1202
- Haakon III of Norway (Håkon Sverreson): 1202–1204
- Guttorm Sigurdsson: 1204

Illegitimate lineage of the Sverre dynasty:

- Haakon IV of Norway (Håkon IV Håkonsson): 1217–1263
  - Haakon Haakonsson the Young, co-king
- Magnus VI of Norway (Magnus Lawmender; Magnus Lagabøte): 1263–1280
- Eric II of Norway (Eric Magnusson): 1280–1299
- Haakon V Magnusson (Håkon V Magnusson): 1299–1319

== See also ==
- Hereditary Kingdom of Norway
- Hardrada dynasty
- Gille dynasty
- Sverre dynasty

== Sources ==
- Claus Krag. Norges historie fram til 1319. Oslo: Universitetsforlage, 2000. ISBN 978-82-00-12938-7 (in Norwegian)
