= Battle of Holmengrå =

1139 naval battle of the Norwegian Civil War

Coordinates: 58°56′15″N 11°06′30″E

- Part of the Civil war era in Norway
Date	12 November 1139
Location	Near Holmengrå, south of Hvaler
Result	Decisive Sigurd/Inge (Gille) victory

Belligerents
Gille dynasty	Hardrada dynasty

Commanders and leaders
Sigurd Haraldsson; Inge Haraldsson	Sigurd Slembe (executed); Magnus the Blind †

Strength
20 ships	12 Norwegian ships 18 Danish ships, mercenaries

Casualties and losses
Unknown	Heavy Norwegian losses Danish ships retreated

The Battle of Holmengrå (Norwegian: Slaget ved Holmengrå) was a naval battle fought on 12 November 1139 near the island Holmengrå south of Hvaler, between the forces of the child kings Sigurd Haraldsson and Inge Haraldsson on the one side, and on the other side the pretender Sigurd Slembe and his ally King Magnus the Blind (by Sigurd's claim his nephew). Inge and Sigurd Haraldsson were sons of the previous king Harald Gille, who had been killed by Sigurd Slembe in 1136. The sons of Harald Gille emerged victorious from the battle. Magnus the Blind was killed in action, while Sigurd Slembe was betrayed, captured, and later tortured and executed.

== Background ==
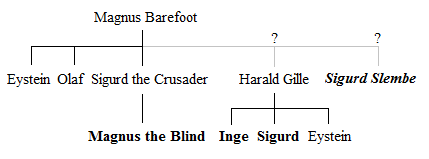
Family relations for the conflict leading to the battle (only kings). Individuals who were active during the battle are bolded

After Sigurd Slembe reportedly was told by his mother that he was a son of King Magnus Barefoot, he travelled to Scotland where he gained military experience, and went on a pilgrimage to the Holy Land. Sigurd returned to Norway in 1136 and arranged a meeting with King Harald Gille, requesting to be recognised as his brother (Harald had also claimed to be a son of Magnus Barefoot), but instead found himself accused of a murder in Orkney and outlawed by Harald. Sigurd managed to escape, and after some time in hiding, he and some supporters assassinated Harald in Bergen. While Sigurd took responsibility for the murder, the people responded that they did not want a man who murdered his brother for a king, or alternatively, if he was not Harald's brother, that he had no right to the throne.

After Harald's death, his queen Ingrid Ragnvaldsdotter and the chieftains quickly arranged to have Harald's sons, still children, proclaimed as kings. Sigurd Haraldsson was proclaimed king at the Øyrating in Trøndelag, while Inge Haraldsson was proclaimed king at the Borgarting in the south-east. Since they had been brought up in different parts of the country, both were proclaimed kings by their respective supporters, but the two factions soon joined forces in light of the threat from Sigurd Slembe.

Sigurd Slembe was again outlawed, and in an attempt to increase his support he allied himself with Magnus the Blind, who had been deposed by Harald Gille in 1135, and had him reinstated as king. When he was deposed, Magnus was blinded, castrated, and had one of his feet cut off, after which he had been placed in a monastery. Following his release by Sigurd, he managed to raise an army in the Uplands by himself, but he was defeated by Harald's sons in the Battle of Minne and fled to Denmark. Sigurd also went to Denmark with a small army, and thereafter turned towards raiding the Norwegian coast. Although Sigurd won little support, he gained much loot from the raids, which after a while allowed him to purchase troops in Denmark.

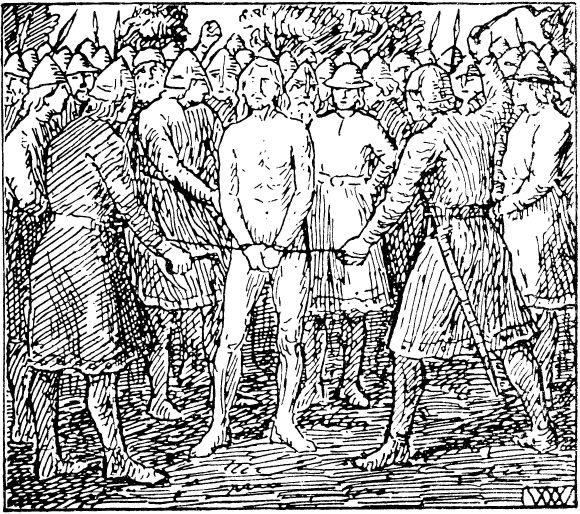
The execution and flaying of Sigurd Slembe, as imagined by Wilhelm Wetlesen (1899)

== The battle ==
The fleet of Sigurd Slembe and Magnus the Blind finally met the fleet of the child kings Sigurd and Inge Haraldsson on 12 November 1139, near the island Holmengrå south of Hvaler. After the first clash, Sigurd Slembe's contingent from Denmark retreated with their 18 ships, out of Sigurd's fleet of a total 30 ships. The casualties in the battle were heavy.

Magnus was struck by a spear and killed along with one of his men, Hreidar Griotgardson, who had attempted to carry the king to safety over to another ship. Sigurd Slembe attempted to escape by jumping in the water and hiding under his shield, but he was captured after being betrayed by one of his men, who told his enemies where Sigurd was in exchange for being spared his life.

Sigurd Slembe was executed after the battle following brutal torture and mutilation. Although the chiefs had wanted to execute Sigurd instantly, according to Snorri Sturluson, "the men who were the most cruel, and thought they had injuries to avenge, advised torturing him." Sigurd's arms and calves were crushed with axe-hammers, the skin on his head was cleaved, his back was flayed and flogged, and his spine was broken, after which he was hanged, decapitated, and thrown into a scree of rocks.

== Bibliography ==
Primary sources

- Sturluson, Snorri (c. 1230). Saga of Sigurd, Inge, and Eystein, the sons of Harald (in Heimskringla). English translation: Samuel Laing (London, 1844).

Modern literature

- Helle, Knut (1974). Norge blir en stat 1130-1319. Handbok i Norges historie. Vol. 3. Universitetsforlaget. ISBN 978-82-00-01323-5.
