= Magnus of Norway =

Magnus of Norway may refer to:

- Magnus I of Norway (1024–1047)
- Magnus II of Norway (1048–1069)
- Magnus III of Norway (1073–1103)
- Magnus IV of Norway (c. 1115–1139)
- Magnus Haraldsson of Norway (c. 1135 – 1145)
- Magnus V of Norway (1156–1184)
- Magnus VI of Norway (1238–1280)
- Magnus VII of Norway (1316–1374)
- Prince Sverre Magnus of Norway (b. 2005)
