= Magnus Haraldsson =

Magnus Haraldsson may refer to:

- Maccus mac Arailt (fl. 971–974), King of the Isles, also known as Magnus Haraldsson
- Magnus II of Norway (1048–1069), King of Norway, also known as Magnus Haraldsson
- Magnus Haraldsson (son of Harald Gille) (c. 1135 – c. 1145), King of Norway
- Magnus Haraldsson (bishop of Skara), 1522–1529, see Diocese of Skara#History
