= Sverresson =

Sverresson is a Nordic surname. Notable people with the surname include:

- Sigurd Sverresson (died c. 1200)
- Haakon Sverresson (1182–1204), King of Norway 1202–1204
- Odd Sverressøn Klingenberg (1871–1944), Norwegian barrister and politician
