= Inge I =

Inge I may refer to:

- Inge I of Sweden (died c. 1100), king
- Inge I of Norway (1135–1161), king
