= Sigurd Brenni =

Norwegian pretender

Sigurd Brenni (Norse: Sigurðr Brennir; died 1189) was a pretender to the Norwegian throne during the Norwegian civil war era. He claimed to be the son of king Inge the Hunchback. His nickname "the Burner" comes from that he was known for roaming around with a band of warriors and setting fire to his enemies' properties.

== Rebellion ==
According to the narrative from Sverris saga Sigurd had joined Jon Kuvlung in rebellion against king Sverre. Jon Kuvlung recognised Sigurd as his brother and accepted him into his group. But Sigurd did not think much of the band around Jon and he decided to strike out on his own instead. With a band of warriors he spent his time roaming around the territories controlled by Sverre; looting, burning and killing. He claimed that these kinds of actions were what Sverre himself did, and that he was just returning the favour.

Just before Christmas 1188 Jon Kuvlung was killed in an ambush by Sverre's men. The Kuvlung party, those who had supported Jon as their king, dissolved. Though, Sigurd and his warriors kept up the rebellion.

Sometime the next year, as Sigurd and his band were pillaging, some local farmers had armed themselves and managed to trap Sigurd inside a house. According to Sverris saga Sigurd, realising that he had lost, held a speech to the besieging farmers: "It is likely that you will fulfill your intention to take my life and slay me; and when you have done so, you will tell King Sverri and other chiefs that you have here slain and cut off the leader of this band, Sigurd Brenni, son of King Ingi. But your story is much less worth the telling than you think and many imagine, though you slay me; for I tell you, and it is the truth, my name is Hedin; I am the son of Thorgrim Hrossaprest, and Icelander through all my pedigree; of a mean family as to rank, though you were ready to consider me a King."

The narrative ends with a description of Sigurd as "[...] a most valiant man, and a very gallant hardy fellow."

== Sverris saga as source ==
Sverris saga was composed shortly after the death of king Sverre, in early 13th century. Which makes it near-contemporary to the events being described and based mainly on eye-witness accounts and primary sources. However, the saga is also extremely biased towards king Sverre, to the point of having been described as propaganda.

== Bibliography ==
- "Saga Sverris konúngs in Old Norse, printed edition from 1834". Archive.org.
- "Sverris saga in Norwegian translation by Gustav Storm og Alexander Bugge from 1914". Heimskringla.no.
- "Sverris saga in English translation by J. Stephton from 1899". Northvegr.org. Archived from the original on 2016-07-30.
- Nordbø, Børge. "Sverres saga". Store norske leksikon (in Norwegian).
- Moseng, Ole Georg; Opsahl, Erik; Pettersen, Gunnar I.; Sandmo, Erling (2007). Norsk historie I (750-1357) (in Norwegian). Oslo: Universitetsforlaget. ISBN 978-82-15-00415-0.
- Sawyer, Birgit; Sawyer, Peter (1993). Medieval Scandinavia. Minneapolis: University of Minnesota Press. ISBN 978-0-8166-1739-5.
