= Gille dynasty =

Norwegian royal house

- Parent house: Hardrada (?)
- Country: Kingdom of Norway
- Founded: 1130
- Founder: Harald Gille
- Current head: extinct, last monarch of this House was Inge II Baardson
- Titles: King of Norway
- Cadet branches: Sverre (illegitimate; dubious)

The Gille dynasty was a Norwegian royal dynasty whose members ruled the Kingdom of Norway during the 12th and early 13th centuries. The name is a modern historiographical designation and was not used by members of the dynasty themselves. It derives from the name of its founder, Harald Gille, whose epithet Gille probably originated from the Middle Irish Gilla Críst, meaning "servant of Christ".

King Harald IV founded the Gille dynasty. Harald arrived in Norway from Ireland or the Hebrides and claimed to be an illegitimate son of King Magnus III Barefoot. If this claim is accepted, the Gille dynasty can be regarded as a cadet branch of the Hardrada dynasty, and, according to the traditional genealogy of the Norwegian kings, ultimately of the Fairhair dynasty. Harald's claim to royal descent appears to have been based primarily on information given to him by his mother and her family during his youth.

Harald's accession in 1130 coincided with the beginning of the civil war era in Norway (borgerkrigstida), which lasted until 1240. Members and descendants of the Gille dynasty played a central role in the succession struggles of the period. Harald initially ruled alongside Magnus IV, a member of the Hardrada dynasty, before defeating him in 1135. After Harald's death in 1136, several of his sons succeeded to the kingship. In 1161–1162, royal power passed to Magnus V, a maternal descendant of the Hardrada dynasty. The Gille line later returned to the throne with Inge II Bårdsson, a cognatic descendant of Harald IV, who reigned from 1204 to 1217. He was succeeded by Haakon IV, marking the establishment of the Sverre dynasty as the ruling royal line.

== Kings and rival kings ==
During the civil war era in Norway, members of the dynasty frequently faced rival claimants to the throne. The following is a list of kings and rival kings belonging, or claiming to belong, to the Gille dynasty:

- Harald Gille: 1130–1136
- Sigurd II of Norway (Sigurd Munn): 1136–1155
- Eystein II of Norway (Øystein Haraldsson): 1142–1157
- Inge I of Norway (Inge the Hunchback; Inge Krokrygg): 1136–1161
- Haakon II of Norway (Haakon Broadshoulder; Håkon Herdebreid): 1157–1162
  - Sigurd Markusfostre: 1162–1163, rival king
  - Eystein Meyla (Eystein the Maiden; Øystein Møyla): 1174–1177, rival king
  - Jon Kuvlung: 1185–1188, rival king; claimed to be a son of Inge I
- Inge II Bårdsson: 1204–1217

Inge II belonged to the Gille dynasty through his mother, Cecilia Sigurdsdatter, an illegitimate daughter of King Sigurd II Munn. Patrilineally, he belonged to the Rein family (Reinsætten), through his father Bård Guttormsson. The Rein family traced its ancestry to Skule Kongsfostre, a Norwegian nobleman associated with the reign of Olaf III. A theory identifying Skule as a son of Tostig Godwinson, and thus as a member of the House of Godwin, has been disputed by both earlier and modern scholars.

== See also ==
- Civil war era in Norway
