= Baugeid Dagsdatter =

Baugeid Dagsdatter (died after 1161) was a Norwegian abbess. She was traditionally the first abbess of the Gimsøy Abbey, one of the first convents in Norway, upon its foundation.

Baugeid Dagsdatter was the daughter of Dag Eilivsson and Ragnhild Skoftesdotter. When her father returned from the crusade of Sigurd the Crusader in circa 1111, he founded the perhaps first convent in Norway, the Gimsøy Abbey. Baugeid eventually became its abbess. Traditionally, she has been called its first abbess, but this is however not correct: she is, however, confirmed as an abbess in about 1161. The first nuns at the abbey where from England. The abbey became a dominant power holder in the Skien and abbess Baugeid was likely assisted in governance by her powerful brother Gregorius Dagsson, who were eventually buried there.

The street Baugeids gate in Skien was named after her.
