= Gimsøy Abbey =

Benedictine monastery on the island of Klosterøya

Coordinates: 59°12′00″N 9°36′39″E

Gimsøy Abbey (Gimsøy kloster) was a Benedictine monastery located on the eastern end of the island of Klosterøya at Skien in Telemark, Norway. The island was commonly referred to as Gimsøy or Gjemsø.

== History ==
The abbey was founded in the first half of the 12th century by Dag Eilivsson and his wife Ragnhild Skoftesdotter at their estate Gimsøy. It was founded after Eilivsson had returned unharmed to Norway after having participated in the Norwegian Crusade to Jerusalem of Sigurd the Crusader in circa 1110. Their daughter Baugeid Dagsdatter (d. after 1161) later became an abbess there. His son and successor Gregorius Dagsson (d. 1161) is commonly reported to have been buried there.

It is counted as the first monastery in Norway founded for women. The year of foundation is unknown. It is regarded as the perhaps first convent in Norway, and was thus founded prior to the second eldest convents of Norway, which were mostly all founded in about 1150. The convent was built in stone and is estimated to have been built by English masons, and its first nuns were also from England. The abbey was well positioned on the navigable river on the way to Skien, and was gradually enlarged and endowed with numerous estates during the centuries.

The abbey eventually came in to financial troubles. By about 1500, the premises had been mortgaged, although the nuns continued to live there. The Reformation in 1537 caused the dissolution of the nunnery, but the nuns were permitted to stay in residence until 1540, when they were forced to leave by order of the king. The buildings burnt to the ground in 1546, and the site was cleared. Today there are no traces of buildings above ground level. The island was taken over by the Crown as a state property and was sold in 1662.

== Related reading ==
- Bergan, Halvor (2002) Drøm og virkelighet bak klosterets murer, Gimsøy nonnekloster 1110-1540 (Porsgrunn: Norgesforlaget) ISBN 82-91986-50-9
- Bergan, Halvor (2005) Kong Sigurds Jorsalferd. Den unge kongen som ble Norges helt (Porsgrunn: Norgesforlaget) ISBN 82-91986-75-4
