= Olav Ugjæva =

Pretender to the Norwegian throne

Olav Ugjæva or Olav Gudbrandsson (Old Norse: Ólafr úgæfa) (died 1169) was a pretender to the Norwegian throne during the civil war era in Norway. Olaf was named king in 1166, but was subsequently defeated by King Magnus V of Norway (Magnus Erlingsson) and forced to flee the country.

== Background ==
Olav Gudbrandsson was the son of Gudbrand Skavhoggsson (Guðbrandr Skafhǫggsson) and Maria Øysteinsdotter (María Eysteinsdóttir), the daughter of King Eystein I of Norway and his wife Ingebjørg Guttormsdatter. Olav was fostered by Sigurd Agnhatt (Sigurðr agnhǫttr) in the Oppland region of eastern Norway. In the late 1160s, Norway was ruled by earl Erling Skakke, during the minority of his son, King Magnus V of Norway (Magnus Erlingsson). Erling had succeeded in placing his son on the throne after lengthy fighting against several rivals to the throne since the mid 1150s.

== Reign ==
In 1166, Sigurd Agnhatt and his foster son Olav raised a force in Oppland, and had Olav proclaimed king, while earl Erling was away in Denmark. After Erling returned to Norway to fight this uprising, Olav and his men attacked Erling in an ambush at Rydjokul in Sørum (Overfallet på Rydjøkul) on 2 February 1167. Erling was wounded, and barely escaped. According to the Sagas, it was said that Olav was unlucky not to have defeated Erling in this fight, and from that he got his nickname, Olav the Unlucky. In 1168 Olav and his men ventured south to the Oslofjord area, but were there defeated in Battle at Stanger, near Våler in Østfold (Slaget på Stanger i Våler). Sigurd Agnhatt was killed in the battle, but Olav Ugjæva escaped and went to Denmark. The next year, Olav fell ill and died there.

== Primary sources ==
The story of Ugjæva is mentioned in the Kings' sagas Heimskringla and Fagrskinna. These two sagas state he died in Denmark, but disagree on whether he died in Århus or Ålborg.
