= Haakon II =

King of Norway from 1157 to 1162

Haakon Herdebrei

King of Norway
- Reign: 1157 – 7 July 1162
- Predecessor: Inge I and Eystein II
- Successor: Magnus V
- Born: 1147
- Died: 7 July 1162 (aged 14–15); Romsdalen
Names
- Haakon Sigurdsson
- House: Gille
- Father: Sigurd II of Norway
- Mother: Thora

Haakon II Sigurdsson (1147 – 7 July 1162), also known as Haakon Herdebrei meaning Haakon Broadshoulder, was King of Norway from 1157 until 1162 during the civil war era in Norway.

== Biography ==
His nickname, Herdebrei, means broad-shouldered, which he was called because of his big size for the age, and unusual broad shoulders. An illegitimate son of Sigurd Munn, in 1157 he was named heir of his uncle Eystein II, who had been co-ruler of Norway together with his brothers Inge the Hunchback and Sigurd Munn. Inge had become the sole ruler of Norway after the death of Eystein and Sigurd Munn.

The former supporters of Sigurd Munn and Eystein II united behind Haakon, renewing the fight against Inge under the leadership of Sigurd Håvardsson of Hedmark. On 3 February 1161, King Inge I was defeated and killed while leading his men into battle against Haakon II near Oslo, after many of his men, led by his vassal Godred II Olafsson, defected to Haakon's side.

On 7 July 1162 King Haakon II was killed in the Battle of Sekken not far from the market town Veøya in Romsdalen. After Inge's fall, his supporters had rallied behind the lendmann Erling Skakke and his son, Magnus Erlingsson. Haakon II was succeeded as king of Norway by King Magnus V.

== Historic context ==
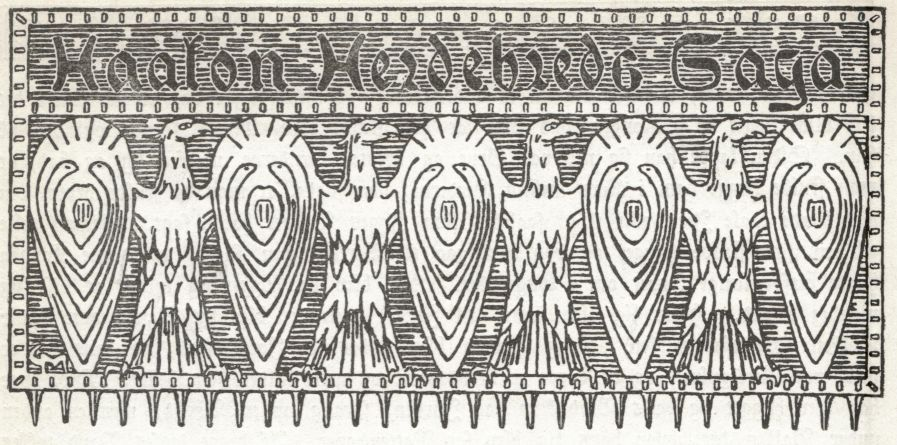

The civil war era in Norway extended over a 110-year period. It started with the death of King Sigurd I of Norway in 1130 and ended with the death of Duke Skule Baardsson in 1240. During this period there were several interlocked conflicts of varying scale and intensity. The background for these conflicts were the unclear Norwegian succession laws, social conditions and the struggle between Church and King. There were then two main parties, firstly known by varying names or no names at all, but finally condensed into parties of Bagler and Birkebeiner. The rallying point regularly was a royal son, who was set up as the head figure of the party in question, to oppose the rule of king from the contesting party.

== Sources ==
- Krag, Claus Norges historie fram til 1319 (Oslo, 2000)

Haakon Herdebrei House of Hardrada Cadet branch of the Fairhair dynasty Born: 1147 Died: July 7 1162
Regnal titles
Preceded by Inge I & Eystein II	King of Norway; 1157–1162 with Inge I (1157–1161); Magnus V (1161–1162)	Succeeded by Magnus V
