= Sigurd Lavard =

Sigurd Lavard (died c. 1200) was the oldest son of King Sverre of Norway. The name "Lavard" is an epithet which probably derives from the Old Norse word for lord.

== Background ==
Sigurd Sverresson Lavard is mentioned the first time during the struggles of Nidaros in November 1181, when Sverre's rival, King Magnus Erlingsson, took the city. According to Saxo Grammaticus, Sigurd was born while Sverre still lived on the Faroes and received the name Unås, honouring the man then thought to be Sverre's father. Later when Sverre claimed to be the son of King Sigurd Munn, Sverre had his own son change name accordingly. Sverre became king of Norway by leading a rebellion against the previous King Magnus.

== Career ==
King Magnus was defeated and killed in 1184, but in 1196 his old followers united to form the Bagler party. The first encounter between Sverre and the Baglers took place along the coast of Rånrike. King Sverre gave Sigurd Lavard the responsibility of guarding a ballista which he had built. However, during the night, the Baglers launched a surprise attack. Sigurd and his men were caught off guard and chased away and the ballista destroyed. Sigurd was not given any commands after this episode. Sigurd Lavard died in 1200 or 1201 while his father was still alive. He left behind a young son Guttorm who would be king for a few months in 1204.

== Other sources ==
Sverris saga is the main source of the brief life history of Sigurd Lavard.

== Other sources ==
- Krag, Claus Sverre – Norges største middelalderkonge (Oslo: H. Aschehoug & Co. 2005) ISBN 82-03-23201-9.
