= Sigurd Slembe =

Pretender to the Norwegian throne (died 1139)

Sigurd Magnusson Slembe (or Slembedjakn) (died 12 November 1139) was a Norwegian pretender to the throne.

He was the subject of Sigurd Slembe, the historical drama written by the Norwegian playwright Bjørnstjerne Bjørnson in 1862.

== Biography ==
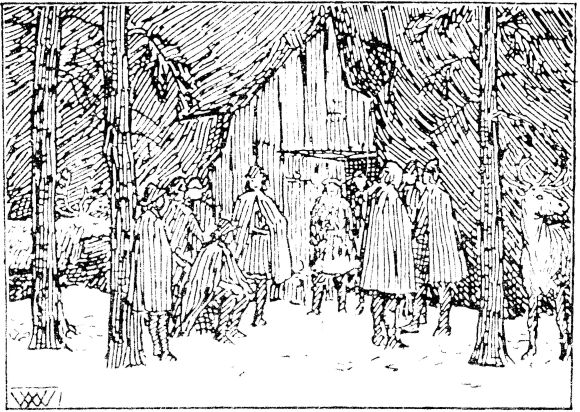
Sigurd Slembe with his men during a raid at Tjeldsund, as imagined by Wilhelm Wetlesen (1899).

Sigurd is commonly believed to have been born around 1100 in southern Norway and was said to have been raised by the priest Adalbrikt. His mother was apparently Thora Saxesdatter. Sigurd himself was consecrated to be a deacon. In Old Norse, his nickname slembi could be translated to mean "noisy", Slembidjákn would mean "noisy priest". Sigurd appeared before King Harald Gille claiming that he was an illegitimate son of the late King Magnus III of Norway. He demanded his putative half-brother King Harald Gille, whose origin actually was quite similar, share power with him as co-kings.

Sigurd married Audhild Torleiv, the daughter of Thorleif Maddadsson. Sigurd had himself proclaimed king in 1135, but his claim was not recognized by King Harald Gille. In 1136, Sigurd arranged for Harald Gille to be killed in his sleep. As soon as Harald was dead, Sigurd had the previous King Magnus IV of Norway, his putative nephew, reinstated as co-king. This was apparently in the hope of increased support and in order to secure his own position. Magnus had previously been imprisoned, blinded and mutilated by Harald. As Magnus was rather incapacitated, Sigurd claimed royal power in Magnus' name. However, Sigurd was convicted and outlawed for regicide.

Sigurd Slembe and Magnus continued to find little support in Norway. King Eric II of Denmark supported them for an unsuccessful campaign. On November 12, 1139, in the naval Battle of Holmengrå near Hvaler in Oslofjord, the Danish supported forces of Magnus and Sigurd were put against supporters of King Inge I of Norway, who was still a child. Magnus was killed in the battle, while Sigurd was captured and betrayed. Sigurd met his end in a brutal manner, tortured to death. His arms and calves were first crushed with axe-hammers, after which the skin on his head was cleaved, his back was flayed and his spine broken. He was thereafter hanged, decapitated and thrown into a scree of rocks.

== Primary sources ==
The main sources for Sigurd and his era are the kings' sagas Heimskringla, Fagrskinna, and Morkinskinna. They in turn base their accounts on the now lost Hryggjarstykki, whose author, Eiríkr Oddsson, either witnessed the events himself, or spoke to people who had.

== Historical context ==
During the civil war period of Norwegian history (1130–1240), there were several interlocked conflicts of varying scale and intensity. The background for these conflicts were the unclear Norwegian succession laws, social conditions and the struggle between church and king. There were then two main parties, firstly known by varying names or no names at all, but finally condensed into parties of Bagler and Birkebeiner. The rallying point regularly was a royal son, who was set up as the head figure of the party in question, to oppose the rule of king from the contesting party.

== Ancestry ==
Ancestors of Sigurd Slembe

16. Sigurd Syr Halfdansson, King of Ringerike
8. Harald III of Norway
17. Åsta Gudbrandsdatter
4. Olaf III of Norway
18. Torberg Arnesson
9. Tora Torbergsdatter
19. Ragnhild Erlingsdatter
2. Magnus III of Norway
10. Johan or Árni lági
5. Thora
1. Sigurd Slembe
6. Saxe of Vik
3. Thora Saxesdatter

== See also ==
- Civil war era in Norway

== Related sources ==
- Bagge, Sverre Society and Politics in Snorri Sturluson's Heimskringla (Berkeley: University of California Press. 1991).
