= Jon Kuvlung =

Norse pretender (1157–1188)

Jon Ingesson Kuvlung (born 1157 - died 1188) was a pretender to the Royal Crown during the civil war era in Norway. He was a rival of the reigning King Sverre of Norway.

== Background ==
Jon Ingesson was claimed to be a son of former King Inge I of Norway, although the Sverris saga, the main source of information for this period of Norwegian history, claims this to have been false. Jon Ingesson was a young cleric when he was set up to the task of figurehead. He was then living as a monk at Hovedøya Abbey on the island of Hovedøya outside Oslo. The nickname Kuvlung derives from Old Norse word kuvl meaning monk cloak. Jon Kuvlung ruled in the region of Viken as rival king until killed by Birkebeiners in Bergen in 1188.

== Kuvlungs ==
During the autumn 1185, former supporters of King Magnus V of Norway from Viken met with Jon Kuvlung. Jon Kuvlung was subsequently declared to be king at Haugating in Tønsberg. The leading man was Símon Kárason whose wife, Margrete Arnesdotter (Margrét Arnadóttir), had been the half-sister of King Inge I of Norway and the daughter of dowager Queen Ingrid Ragnvaldsdotter. Margrét Arnadóttir was additionally the full sister of Nikolás Arnason, Bishop of Oslo and a prominent opponent of King Sverre. Símon Kárason and Margrét Arnadóttir were also the parents of Philippus Simonsson, a future pretender to the throne of Norway.

This group was in many ways the direct successor of the Heklung party which had previously challenged the rule of King Sverre. The Heklungs had a close connection with the Church. Although the Church did not openly support the Kuvlungs, it at least gave its silent approval. The Church never spoke up against Jon for leaving his monastery, while his opponent King Sverre was heavily criticised for abandoning his prior duties as a priest on the Faroes. The Kuvlungs soon gained control of eastern and western Norway which had been the old Heklung strongholds.

During the Autumn of 1186, the Kuvlungs attacked Nidaros. This offensive took King Sverre by surprise. He took refuge in the recently constructed stone castle Sverresborg. Unable to take the castle, the Kuvlungs were forced to retreat. In 1188, King Sverre sailed south with a large fleet. They first met at Tønsberg, but neither side dared to offer battle. The Kuvlungs slipped away to Bergen. King Sverre attacked Bergen just before Christmas. Jon's boat became stuck on a rock when he was rowed out on the harbor to face the enemy. Here Jon Kuvlung was killed, ending the Kuvlung uprising.

== Historic context ==
Since 1130 there had been several interlocked civil wars of varying scale and intensity. The background for these conflicts were the unclear Norwegian succession laws, social conditions and the struggle between Church and King. The rallying point regularly was a royal son, who was set up as the head figure of the party in question, to oppose the rule of king from the contesting party. In 1184 King Sverre I of Norway and his party the Birkebeiners had defeated King Magnus V of Norway and the Heklungs at the Battle of Fimreite. In this battle King Magnus was killed and King Sverre had ruled as uncontested King of Norway for several years.

== Other sources ==
- Krag, Claus Sverre. Norges største middelalderkonge (Aschehoug. Oslo: 2005)
- Holmsen, Andreas Norges historie. Fra de eldste tider til 1660 (Universitetsforlaget, Oslo: 1939)

Preceded by Magnus Erlingsson (King of Norway)	Viken-party pretender to the Norwegian throne	Succeeded by Sigurd Magnusson
