= Sigurd II =

King of Norway from 1136 to 1155

Sigurd Munn

King of Norway
- Reign: 1136 – 6 February 1155
- Predecessor: Harald Gille
- Successor: Inge I and Eystein II
- Co-rulers: Inge I (1136–1155); Eystein II (1142–1155)
- Born: 1133
- Died: 10 June 1155; Bergen
- Burial: Old Cathedral, Bergen (destroyed in 1531)
- Illegitimate children: Haakon II; Sigurd Markusfostre; Harald Sigurdsson; Cecilia Sigurdsdotter; Helga Sigurdsdotter
- House: Gille
- Father: Harald Gille
- Mother: Thora Guttormsdotter (concubine)

Sigurd Haraldsson (Old Norse: Sigurðr Haraldsson; 1133 – 10 June 1155), or Sigurd II, also called Sigurd Munn, was king of Norway from 1136 to 1155. He was son of Harald IV Gille, king of Norway and his mistress Thora Guttormsdotter (Þóra Guthormsdóttir). He served as co-ruler with his half-brothers, Inge Haraldsson and Eystein II Haraldsson. His epithet Munn means "the Mouth" in Old Norse. He was killed in the power-struggle against his brother, Inge, in an early stage of the civil war era in Norway.

== Reign ==
Sigurd was fostered by Guttorm (Guthormr) or Sådegyrd Bårdsson (Sáðagyrðr Bárðarson) in Trøndelag. When his father was murdered by the pretender Sigurd Slembe in 1136, Sigurd was made king at the thing of Eyrathing. At the same time, his brothers Inge and Magnus were also made kings and co-rulers. Their respective guardians joined forces against Sigurd Slembe and his ally, the former king Magnus the Blind. The battles against these pretenders dominated the early years of Sigurd's reign. In 1139, they were defeated and slain at the Battle of Holmengrå.

After this followed a period of peace. During the minority of the brothers, Sigurd, Inge and Magnus, the Norwegian nobility cooperated to rule the kingdom and advise the kings. In 1142, their brother Eystein came to Norway from Scotland. His parentage was accepted, since Harald Gille had acknowledged that he had a son overseas. Eystein thus became king and co-ruler together with Sigurd and Inge. Magnus, of whom little more is known, died of natural causes at some point in the 1140s.

In 1152, Norway was visited by the papal legate Nicholas Breakspear. During his visit, the church in Norway was organised into a separate archbishopric, with its seat at Nidaros.

As they grew up, and their old advisors died, hostility began to grow among the brothers. In 1155, all three of them were set to meet in Bergen in an effort to keep the peace. Inge accused Sigurd and Eystein of planning to have him dethroned. Sigurd denied the accusations, but a few days later one of Inge's guards was killed by one of Sigurd's. At the advice of his mother Ingrid and his senior advisor, Gregorius Dagsson, Inge ordered his men to assault the house where Sigurd was residing. Sigurd had but few men, and no mercy was given. King Sigurd fell on 6 February 1155. He was buried by the old cathedral of Bergen, in what is today Bergenhus Fortress This cathedral was demolished and replaced by a larger cathedral soon after.

== Aftermath ==
King Eystein was late in arriving for the meeting, and only approached the city after Sigurd was already dead. An uneasy settlement was reached between Inge and Eystein, but peace between them did not last long. As it turned out, the killing of king Sigurd started the second phase of the Norwegian civil war era, with fighting continuing with only short let-ups until 1208. The reasons for the fighting in Bergen remain disputed. According to the sagas, Eystein and Sigurd had plotted to strip Inge of his royal title and divide his share of the kingdom between them. Some modern historians doubt this version, seeing it as Inge’s excuse for his own aggressive actions.

During the following civil wars, several royal pretenders claimed to be the son of King Sigurd. For some, this was probably mostly a political statement, as royal lineage was necessary to be a candidate for the throne. Sverre Sigurdsson was the most successful by far of these claimants, and eventually succeeded in becoming king of Norway. Sigurd never married.

The sagas draw a rather negative picture of both Sigurd and his brother Eystein, generally choosing to portray Inge as the just ruler of the three brothers. Heimskringla writes of Sigurd:

When King Sigurd grew up he was a very ungovernable, restless man in every way; and so was King Eystein, but Eystein was the more reasonable of the two. King Sigurd was a stout and strong man, of a brisk appearance; he had light brown hair, an ugly mouth; but otherwise a well-shaped countenance. He was polite in his conversation beyond any man, and was expert in all exercises.

== Descendants ==
- Haakon II Sigurdsson (Hákon), known as Haakon the Broadshouldered (1147–1162). Made king by Sigurd and Eystein's supporters after Eystein's fall in 1157, in opposition to Inge Haraldsson. Killed in battle against Inge's old supporters and their new king Magnus Erlingsson. Mother: Tora (Þóra).
- Sigurd Sigurdsson Markusfostre (Sigurðr), known as Sigurd Markusfostre (died 1163). Proclaimed king by Haakon the Broadshouldered's followers in 1162, captured and decapitated by king Magnus' supporters in 1163.
- Harald Sigurdsson (Haraldr), (died 1170s). Captured and executed by king Magnus' supporters, because his parentage made him a potential threat to Magnus' rule. Mother: Kristin Sigurdsdotter (Kristín Sigurðardóttir).
- Cecilia Sigurdsdotter (died late 1180s). Married Folkvid the Lawspeaker, marriage later annulled. Mother of Haakon the Crazy. Remarried Bård Guttormsson (Bárðr Guthormsson)
- Helga Sigurdsdatter (Vestfold, c. 1152 - Bergen, 1202), "frilledatter", "Princess of Norway". Mother: Gunnhild Stadheim Giske (Stadheim, 1130 - 1200). Wife of Hjarande Hallvarson Hvite (Vestlandet, 1140 - Lier, 1220-1230), a nobleman from Western Norway living in 1165, "adelsmann på Vestlandet", and had issue

=== Disputed ===
- Sverre Sigurdsson (Sverrir), (died 1202). Ruled as king of Norway from 1184 until his death. Mother: Gunnhild Stadheim Giske (Stadheim, 1130 - 1200). Whether he was in fact a son of Sigurd is highly dubious. Sverris saga, the saga of Sigurd's alleged son, also draws a somewhat unfavourable picture of Sigurd, contrasting him with the positive qualities of Sverre.
- Eirik? (Eiríkr) Sigurdsson? (died 1190). Made Jarl by king Sverre. Poisoned. Whether he was in fact a son of Sigurd is unknown.

== Sources ==
The main sources to Sigurd’s reign are the kings’ sagas Heimskringla, Fagrskinna, Morkinskinna and Ágrip. The three former base at least part of their account on the older saga Hryggjarstykki, which was written some time between 1150 and 1170, and was thus a near-contemporary source. This saga itself has not been preserved.

== Other sources ==
- Snorri Sturluson; translator Lee M. Hollander (repr. 1991). Heimskringla : History of the Kings of Norway. University of Texas Press. ISBN 0-292-73061-6
- Matthew James Driscoll (ed.); (1995). Agrip Af Noregskonungasogum. Viking Society for Northern Research. ISBN 0-903521-27-X
- Kari Ellen Gade & Theodore Murdock Andersson (eds.); (2000) Morkinskinna : The Earliest Icelandic Chronicle of the Norwegian Kings (1030–1157). Cornell University Press. ISBN 0-8014-3694-X
- Alison Finlay; editor and translator (2004). Fagrskinna, a Catalogue of the Kings of Norway. Brill Academic Publishers. ISBN 90-04-13172-8

Sigurd Munn House of Gille Cadet branch of the Fairhair dynasty Born: 1133 Died: February 6 1155
Regnal titles
Preceded by Harald IV	King of Norway; 1136–1155 with Inge I (1136–1155); Magnus IV (1137–1139); Eystein II (1142–1155); Magnus Haraldsson (1142–1145)	Succeeded by Inge I & Eystein II
