= Åsta Gudbrandsdatter =

Mother of two Norwegian Kings

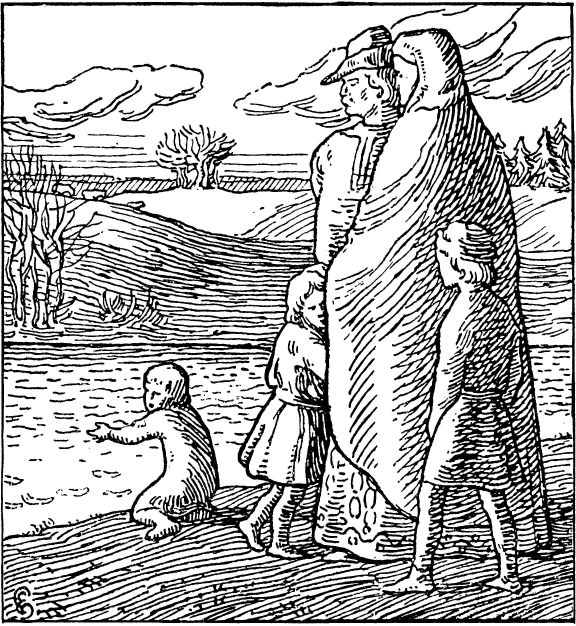
Saint Olaf with his half-brothers Halfdan Egedius, illustration for Olav den helliges saga. 1899

Åsta Gudbrandsdatter (c. 975/980 – c. 1020/1030) was the mother of two Norwegian kings, Saint Olaf and Harald Hardrada. The primary source for the life of Åsta is Snorri Sturluson's saga Heimskringla, a 13th-century collection of tales about the lives of the Norwegian kings. In the chronicle, Åsta is described as "generous and high-minded" and as a keen political player and guiding influence on her royal husbands and children. Her parents were Gudbrand Kula and Ulfhild.

== Wife of Harald Grenske ==
Åsta Gudbrandsdatter first appears in Snorri's 'Saga of King Olaf Tryggvason' as the wife of Harald Grenske (Grenski), ruler of Vestfold. In the summer of 994, although already married to Åsta, Harald traveled to the Baltic and proposed marriage to his foster-sister Sigrid. He had learned that her landholdings in Sweden were no less extensive than his own in Norway, and promised to abandon Åsta, who although "good and clever" was not as well-born as he was. Sigrid refused, objecting that Harald should feel fortunate in his existing marriage and that Åsta was carrying Harald's child. When she rode off, Harald pursued her back to her estate. That evening, Sigrid hosted a lavish feast at which Harald and his companions became drunk. Under cover of darkness, she ordered her armed men to set fire to the hall in which Harald slept, and he was killed; those of his companions who escaped the flames were put to the sword. Following this episode, Sigrid was called Storråda, 'the Haughty.'

On learning of her husband's death, Åsta was outraged both by Harald's infidelity and his murder. She returned immediately to the home of her father Gudbrand Kula in Oppland, where later that year she gave birth to a son, whom she named Olaf. He would later be renowned as St. Olaf, King of Norway from 1015 to 1028.

== Marriage to Sigurd Syr and Baptism ==
Soon after Harald Grenske's death, Åsta married Sigurd Syr, king of Ringerike, and brought the child Olaf with her to be raised in the home of his stepfather. When King Olaf Tryggvason of Norway arrived in 998 to convert the populace of Ringerike to Christianity, Sigurd, Åsta, and Olaf were all baptized, with the king himself acting as Olaf's godfather.

According to the sagas, Åsta and Sigurd Syr were good and noble rulers and had the following children together:

1. Guttorm
2. Gunnhild - married Ketil Kalv of Ringnes in Stange
3. Halfdan
4. Ingerid - married Nevstein, mother of Tore, foster-father of King Magnus Barefoot
5. Harald III 'Hardrada'- King of Norway from 1047 to 1066, sometimes called 'the last great Viking'

== Influence ==
In 1007, Åsta arranged Olaf's first military expedition by ordering her steward Hrane to take the then-twelve-year-old Olaf on board a warship as commander. According to Heimskringla, it was custom that a captain of noble descent automatically be afforded the rank 'King'; Åsta thus strategically secured a title for her son although he did not yet have any lands or holdings. When Olaf returned home in 1014 as an accomplished leader, Åsta ordered her household to receive him in the manner of a great king. When Sigurd Syr heard this, knowing Olaf's ambitions, he questioned whether Åsta could lead her son "out of this business with the same splendour she was leading him into it."

Olaf took his mother into military counsel along with Sigurd and Hrane. When he shared his intention to declare himself sole ruler of Norway, Åsta threw her support behind her son:

"For my part, my son, I am rejoiced at thy arrival, but much more at thy advancing thy honour. I will spare nothing for that purpose that stands in my power, although it be but little help that can be expected from me. But if a choice could be made, I would rather that thou shouldst be the supreme king of Norway, even if thou shouldst not sit longer in thy kingdom than Olaf Tryggvason did, than that thou shouldst not be a greater king than Sigurd Syr is, and die the death of old age."

Sigurd Syr lent military support to Olaf in his campaigns and on the occasion of her son's 1018 victory over the Oppland kings, Åsta held a great feast of victory.

Åsta was also the mother of King Harald III, who was fifteen years old when his brother Olaf died at the Battle of Stiklestad in 1030. Harald ruled Norway from 1046 until his death in 1066 at the Battle of Stamford Bridge; his famous defeat by the forces of England's King Harold Godwinson has traditionally been considered the end of the Viking Age.

== Other sources ==
- Weis, Frederick Lewis, Ancestral Roots of Certain American Colonists Who Came to America Before 1700 (Genealogical Publishing Company, 1992)
- Koht, Halvdan, The Old Norse Sagas (Periodicals Service Co., 1931)
