= Eystein Haraldsson =

King of Norway from 1142 to 1157

King of Norway
- Reign: 1142–1157
- Predecessor: Sigurd II and Inge I
- Successor: Inge I and Haakon II
- Born: c. 1125 possibly Scotland
- Died: 21 August 1157; Bohuslän
- Burial: Foss, Bohuslän
- Spouse: Ragna Nikolasdatter
- Issue: Eystein Meyla
- House: Gille
- Father: Harald IV of Norway
- Mother: Bjaðǫk

Eystein Haraldsson (Old Norse: Eysteinn; Norwegian: Øystein); c. 1125 – 21 August 1157), also called Eystein II, was King of Norway from 1142 to 1157. He ruled alongside his half-brothers, Inge Haraldsson and Sigurd Munn. He was killed in the power-struggle against his brother Inge in an early stage of the civil war era in Norway.

== Origins ==
Eystein was born, apparently in Scotland, the son of Harald Gille, who was king of Norway from 1130 to 1136, and a woman named Bjaðǫk. Harald was born and raised in Ireland or Scotland, and Eystein was born there. When Harald went to Norway in 1127 to press his claim to royal inheritance, Eystein did not go with him. However, Harald let it be known that he had fathered a son before coming to Norway.

== Reign ==
Eystein first appears in the sagas in 1142, when several Norwegian lendmenn travelled west and fetched him back to Norway from Scotland. His mother came with him to Norway. There, he was recognised as king, and given a share of the kingdom with his younger brothers. The division of the kingdom does not seem to have been territorial, all brothers seem to have held equal regal status over all parts of the country. This period of their reign saw the establishment of an independent Norwegian Archiepiscopacy in Nidaros (Trondheim) in 1152.

Earlier Great Heathen Army battles in 800s England

The sagas Heimskringla and Orkneyinga saga relates that at some point in the early 1150s, king Eystein went on a campaign to Scotland. He captured Harald Maddadson, earl of Orkney in Caithness, and forced him to ransom himself for a considerable sum. He then proceeded to loot along the Scottish coast, attacking Aberdeen and in that same time he took advantage of The Anarchy and plundered the English coast in a voyage reminiscent of the earlier Viking expeditions.

== Civil war ==
According to the sagas, relations between the three brothers were peaceful as long as the two younger brothers' guardians were alive. But as the younger brothers grew up, tensions arose. In 1155, a meeting between the brothers in Bergen resulted in fighting breaking out between the men of king Inge and king Sigurd, in which king Sigurd was killed. King Eystein was late in arriving for the meeting, and only approached the city after Sigurd was already dead. An uneasy settlement was reached between Inge and Eystein. The reasons for the fighting in Bergen remain disputed. According to the sagas, Eystein and Sigurd had plotted to strip Inge of his royal title and divide his share of the kingdom between them. Some modern historians doubt this version, seeing it as Inge's excuse for his own aggressive actions. In any event, peace between Inge and Eystein did not hold for long after the events of 1155. In 1157, both sides gathered their forces for a confrontation. Inge's forces outnumbered Eystein's, and when they met, on the west coast near Moster, Eystein's forces melted away. Eystein was forced to flee, over land to Viken (the Oslofjord-area). Abandoned by his own men, he was caught, somewhere in the area of present-day Bohuslän, and killed by his captors. Whether or not king Inge ordered his killing seems to have been a disputed question at the time. Eystein's body was buried in the church of Foss in Tunge Hundred. According to Heimskringla, the local population of the area started worshipping Eystein as a saint.

== Aftermath ==
After Eystein's death, his supporters rallied around the young Haakon the Broadshouldered, Sigurd Munn's son, Eystein's nephew. They continued the war against king Inge, in an early stage of the so-called civil war era, which was to last on and off until 1240. The sagas draw a rather negative picture of both Eystein and his brother Sigurd, generally choosing to portray Inge as the just ruler of the three brothers. Heimskringla states of Eystein:

"King Eystein was dark and dingy in complexion, of middle height, and a prudent able man; but what deprived him of consideration and popularity with those under him were his avarice and narrowness".

Eystein was married to Ragna Nikolasdottir, a Norwegian gentlewoman. His bastard son Eystein Meyla was proclaimed king by the Birkebeiner party in 1176, but was defeated and killed the year after.

== Sources ==
The main sources to Eystein's reign are the kings' sagas Heimskringla, Fagrskinna, Morkinskinna and Ágrip. The three former base at least part of their account on the older saga Hryggjarstykki, which was written some time between 1150 and 1170, and was thus a near-contemporary source. This saga itself has not been preserved.

Eystein Haraldsson House of Gille Cadet branch of the Fairhair dynasty Born: c. 1125 Died: 1157
Regnal titles
Preceded by Sigurd II & Inge I	King of Norway; 1142–1157 with Sigurd II (1142–1155); Inge I (1142–1157); Magnus Haraldsson (1142–1145)	Succeeded by Inge I & Haakon II
