= Wilhelm Wetlesen =

Norwegian painter and illustrator (1871–1925)

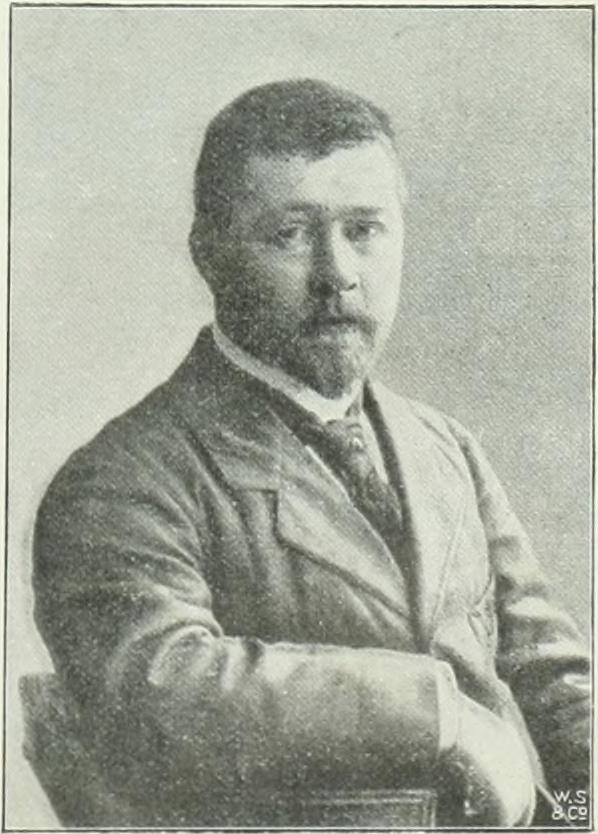
Wilhelm Wetlesen, c. 1899.

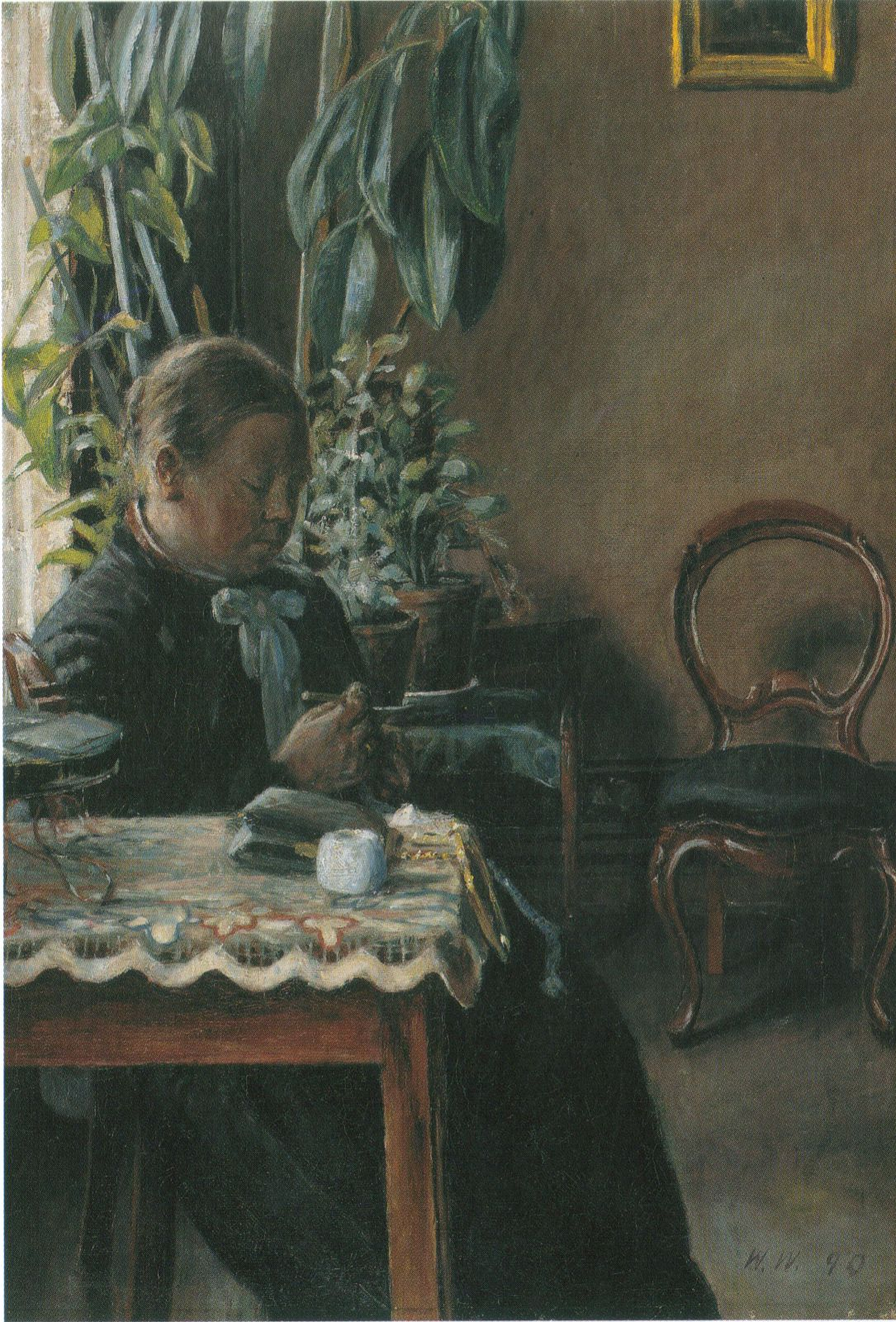
Moder hekler, 1890

Wilhelm Laurits Wetlesen (28 November 1871 – 15 June 1925) was a Norwegian painter and illustrator. He was part of the circle around painter Erik Werenskiold.

== Biography ==
Wetlesen was born at Sandefjord in Vestfold, Norway. He was the son of Christine Margrethe Christensen and her husband John Eliseus Sanne Wetlesen. He studied art in Kristiania (now Oslo) and in Copenhagen, Denmark. He later became a student at the painting school of Kristian Zahrtmann, studying there in the years 1889, 1890, 1892 and 1894. Zahrtmann became his mentor, and eventually also a good friend. Zahrtmann and Wetlesen went on a total of three study trips to Italy. Wetlesen also traveled to Paris with other painters, and he lived for long periods in the Italian cities of Florence and Rome. During this period, Wetlesen mostly painted Danish-inspired interior motifs and pictures of Florentine landscapes.

He debuted at the Autumn Exhibition (Høstutstillingen ) at Oslo in 1892. In 1898, Erik Werenskiold recommended Wetlesen to replace Halfdan Egedius, who had become ill, to take part in illustrating for the 1899 edition of the Old Norse saga Heimskringla of Snorri Sturluson. Wetlesen made 43 illustrations for the book, although his drawings have been considered to not convey the "saga atmosphere" as good as the other five illustrators. After 1900, Wetlesen painted Norwegian landscapes in various parts of the country, including in Telemark, Jæren, and Vestfold. He also stayed at Lillehammer, where he especially worked with the artists Alf Lundeby, Lars Jorde and Frederik Collett. From 1908 he joined the painter colony in Kviteseid Municipality.

At an early age, Wetlesen was struck with a debilitating heart condition, which combined with his artistic modesty and self-criticism probably contributed to that he did not fully live up to his expectations. His mentor Zahrtmann had also been concerned by his reported indolence. Wetlesen was nonetheless socially outgoing and a centre for his friends and the Norwegian art scene, and he took initiative to establish the artist association Kunstnerforbundet in 1910, and was the first chairman for the organisation from 1911 to 1912. Wetlesen died in Oslo in 1925.
