= Magnus Haraldsson (son of Harald Gille) =

King of Norway from 1142 to 1145

King of Norway
- Reign: 1142–1145
- Born: c. 1135
- Died: c. 1145
- House: House of Gille
- Father: Harald Gille

Magnus Haraldsson (Old Norse: Magnús Haraldsson; c. 1135 – c. 1145) was a king of Norway from 1142 until his death around 1145, reigning together with three of his brothers. He was a son of King Harald Gille by an unknown concubine.

Magnus was born sometime after 1130, when his father arrived in Norway. He was raised by the chieftain Kyrpinga-Orm at Støle in Sunnhordland. He does not appear to have been taken as king after his father's death together with his brothers Sigurd and Inge. He first appears in the sagas in 1142, when Harald's oldest son, Eystein, came from Scotland and became king, together with Magnus. In a poem by the skald Einar Skuleson, all the four are counted as kings at the same time. In contrast to his three brothers who are praised for deeds as warriors, Magnus is said to "make peace between the men". According to the sagas, Magnus had poor feet, and he became sick and died at a young age. He has later generally not been listed in Norwegian regnal lists. He appears in some lists, however.

Magnus Haraldsson House of Gille Born: c. 1135 Died: c. 1145
Regnal titles
Preceded by Sigurd II; Inge I	King of Norway; 1142–1145 with Sigurd II; Inge I Eystein II	Succeeded by Sigurd II; Inge I Eystein II
