= Sigurd Syr =

Norwegian petty King (died c. 1018)

Sigurd Syr (Old Norse: Sigurðr sýr) (died c. 1018) was a Norwegian petty king of Ringerike, a region in Buskerud. He was notable in Norwegian history largely through his association with Kings Harald Hardrada and Olaf II of Norway. By his marriage with Åsta Gudbrandsdatter after her first husband Harald Grenske had died, Sigurd Syr was stepfather of King Olaf II and the father of King Harald III.

== Biography ==
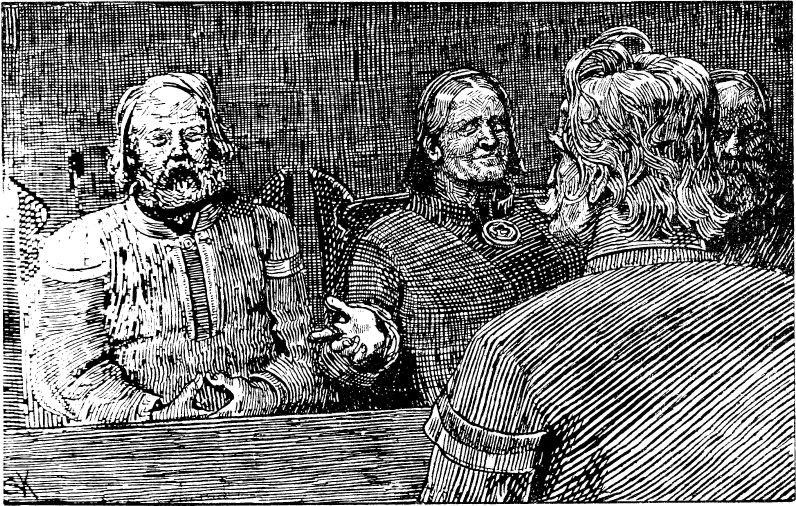
Sigurd and His Wife Åsta consulting Olaf II the Holy

The traditional view of Sigurd Halvdansson Syr's pedigree, as presented in various Icelandic poems and historical sagas culminating in Snorri Sturluson's Heimskringla, is that he was a great-grandson of King Harald Fairhair, through Harald's son Sigurd Rise. Doubt has been cast on his connection with Sigurd Rise, a relatively obscure son of Harald Fairhair by a Sami girl named Snæfríðr Svásadottir. Sigurd Syr's father Halfdan may not have been King Harald's grandson Halfdan of Hadafylke. There are no contemporary attestations of such a Halfdan. It is not very likely that this lineage represent historical realities. Many modern historians regard the Fairhair genealogy as in large part invented.

According to Heimskringla, Sigurd Syr was a prudent man, taciturn and generally modest, although very wealthy. He was known as a good caretaker of his property, personally involved in managing it, and wise and peaceful. He may well have owned several large farms. His nickname "Syr" can be translated as meaning "sow or swine" (related to Old Norse svīn). The reason for this is unknown; P.A. Munch suggested that it was because his attention was so focused on farming and that his nickname meant "One who digs or roots in the soil of the field". Since Sigurd was a respected man of high birth, the epithet was most probably an honorable title. He was also promised the throne of England and his son Harald went to get it for him when he died.

Sigurd Syr was baptized into the Christian faith in 998. According to the Heimskringla, "King Olaf Tryggvason came to Ringerike to spread Christianity, Sigurd Syr and his wife allowed themselves to be baptized".

Sigurd Syr was not personally politically ambitious. He was not fond of the pomp and ceremony of nobility, but played his expected part. He fully supported his stepson Olaf's ambitions to leadership and command. In 1014, he successfully petitioned his peers, the other Norwegian local kings, for their support in his stepson's cause when Olav wanted to build an army in Norway.

== Family ==
According to the sagas, Sigurd sýr and his wife Åsta Gudbrandsdatter were good and noble rulers and had the following children together:

1. Guttorm
2. Gunnhild - married Ketil Kalv of Ringnes in Stange
3. Halfdan
4. Ingerid - married Nevstein, mother of Tore, foster-father of King Magnus Barefoot
5. Harald Hardrada - King of Norway from 1046 to 1066, sometimes called 'the last great Viking'
