= Inge Haraldsson =

King of Norway from 1136 to 1161

King of Norway
- Reign: 1136 – 3 February 1161
- Predecessor: Harald Gille
- Successor: Haakon Herdebrei and Magnus Erlingsson
- Born: 1135
- Died: 3 February 1161 (aged 25–26); Oslo
- Burial: St. Hallvard's Cathedral (demolished)
- Issue: Jon Kuvlung (claimed); Sigurd Brenni (claimed); Harald Ingason (claimed)
- House: Gille
- Father: Harald Gille
- Mother: Ingrid Ragnvaldsdotter

Inge Haraldsson (Old Norse: Ingi Haraldsson; 1135 – 3 February 1161) was king of Norway (being Inge I) from 1136 to 1161. Inge’s reign fell within the start of the period known in Norwegian history as the civil war era, and he was never the sole ruler of the country. He is often known as Inge the Hunchback (Norwegian: Inge Krokrygg; Old Norse: Ingi krókhryggr), because of his physical disability. However, this epithet does not appear in medieval sources.

== Childhood and accession ==
Inge was the only son of King Harald Gille by his wife, Ingiríðr Ragnvaldsdóttir. At the time, however, legitimate birth was not an important factor in determining succession to the throne. Inge was fostered by Ögmund or Ámund Gyrðarson in eastern Norway. His father, Harald, was murdered in 1136 by the pretender Sigurd Slembe. The one-year-old Inge was named king at the thing of Borgarting near Sarpsborg. His two half-brothers, also infants, Magnus and Sigurd, were also named king at other things. Their respective guardians joined forces against Sigurd Slembe and his ally, the former king Magnus the Blind. In 1139, they were defeated and killed at the Battle of Holmengrå. According to the sagas Morkinskinna and Heimskringla, Inge’s infirmity stemmed from having been carried into battle by one of his guardians during a battle in 1137: “...his back was knotted into a hump, and the one foot was shorter than the other; and he was besides so infirm that he could scarcely walk as long as he lived.”s:Heimskringla/Saga of Sigurd, Inge, and Eystein, the Sons of Harald#Of Sigurd Slembidjakn. The Danish chronicler Saxo Grammaticus offers the alternative explanation that he became a hunchback after having been dropped on the floor by a maid during infancy. During the minority of Inge, Sigurd and Magnus, the country was ruled in peace by their guardians, prominent among whom was Inge’s mother, queen Ingiriðr. Magnus, of whom little more is known, died at some point in the 1140s. In 1142, a fourth, older brother, Eystein, came to Norway from Scotland, where he had grown up. Harald Gille had acknowledged Eystein as a son before his death, and Eystein was therefore given a share of the kingdom.

== Adulthood and reign ==
The division of the kingdom does not seem to have been territorial, all brothers seem to have held equal regal status over all parts of the country. According to the sagas, relations between the brothers were peaceful as long as their guardians were alive. This period of their reign saw the establishment of an independent Norwegian Archiepiscopacy in Nidaros (Trondheim) in 1152. As their guardians died, and the brothers grew up, conflict broke out.

In 1155, a meeting between the brothers in Bergen resulted in fighting breaking out between the men of king Inge and king Sigurd, in which king Sigurd was killed. King Eystein was late in arriving for the meeting, and only approached the city after Sigurd was already dead. An uneasy settlement was reached between Inge and Eystein. The reasons for the fighting in Bergen remain disputed. According to the sagas, Eystein and Sigurd had plotted to strip Inge of his royal title and divide his share of the kingdom between them. Some modern historians doubt this version, seeing it as Inge’s excuse for his own aggressive actions. In any event, peace between Inge and Eystein did not hold for long after the events of 1155. In 1157, both sides gathered their forces for a confrontation. Inge’s forces outnumbered Eystein’s, and when they met, on the west coast near Moster, Eystein’s forces melted away. Eystein was forced to flee, he was caught and killed in Bohuslän later the same year.

Inge was now the last remaining brother. However, the supporters of Sigurd and Eystein united behind a son of Sigurd, Haakon the Broadshouldered. They renewed the fight against Inge. Heimskringla notes that Inge was popular among the “chieftains” – the lendmenn – because he allowed them a great say in the running of the kingdom. Foremost among his advisors was the lendmann Gregorius Dagsson, another prominent supporter was Erling Skakke. The king’s mother, who survived her son, also appears to have remained influential throughout his reign. On 7 January 1161, Gregorius was killed in a skirmish with king Haakon’s forces. On 3 February the same year, Inge was defeated and killed, leading his men into battle against King Haakon near Oslo, after many of his men, led by his vassal Guðrøðr Óláfsson, the exiled King of the Isles, defected to King Haakon’s side. He was buried in St. Hallvard’s church in Oslo.

== Aftermath ==
The period of peace during the minority of king Inge and his brothers – from 1129 until 1155 - was the longest peaceful period Norway was to see until 1240, as the dispute between the brothers ushered in the Norwegian civil war era. Heimskringla describes Inge thus:

King Inge was the handsomest among them in countenance. He had yellow but rather thin hair, which was much curled. His stature was small; and he had difficulty in walking alone, because he had one foot withered, and he had a hump both on his back and his breast. He was of cheerful conversation, and friendly towards his friends; was generous, and allowed other chiefs to give him counsel in governing the country. He was popular, therefore, with the public; and all this brought the kingdom and the mass of the people on his side.s:Heimskringla/Saga of Sigurd, Inge, and Eystein, the Sons of Harald#Habits and Manners of Harald's Sons.

After Inge’s fall, his supporters rallied behind the lendmann Erling Skakke and his son, king Magnus Erlingsson. This party is sometimes referred to as the lendmann-party.

== Issue ==
The sagas of king Inge do not mention any offspring, but Sverris saga mentions three claimed sons of king Inge:

- Harald (Haraldr Ingason), who was killed at the Battle of Fimreite in 1184. He is mentioned as one of the magnates who follow Magnus Erlingsson on his return from Denmark in 1184. Sverris saga does not dispute or doubt his parentage, like it does with his purported brothers. However, in the 1914 Norwegian translation by Gustav Storm and Alexander Bugge there is added a note saying; "Harald Ingesson is otherwise unknown. Inge Hunchback hardly had a son".
- Jon Kuvlung (Jon Ingason), who established himself as king in eastern Norway and was killed in an ambush in 1188.
- Sigurd Brenni (Sigurdr Ingason), a warlord who pillaged king Sverre's territories and was killed by a group of disgruntled farmers in 1189.

== Sources ==
The main sources to Inge’s reign are the kings’ sagas Heimskringla, Fagrskinna, Morkinskinna and Ágrip. The three former base at least part of their account on the older saga Hryggjarstykki, which was written some time between 1150 and 1170, and was thus a near-contemporary source. This saga itself has not been preserved.

== Notes ==
Inge Haraldsson House of Gille Cadet branch of the Fairhair dynasty Born: 1135 Died: February 3 1161
Regnal titles
Preceded by Harald IV	King of Norway; 1136–1161 with Sigurd II (1136–1155); Magnus IV (1137–1139); Eystein II (1142–1157); Magnus Haraldsson (1142–1145); Haakon II (1157–1161)	Succeeded by Haakon II & Magnus V
