= Harald Gille =

King of Norway from 1130 to 1136

King of Norway
- Reign: 1130 – 14 December 1136
- Predecessor: Sigurd I
- Successor: Sigurd II and Inge I
- Born: c. 1102; Ireland/Hebrides
- Died: 14 December 1136 (aged 32–33); Bergen
- Spouse: Ingrid Ragnvaldsdotter
- Issue: Inge I, King of Norway; Eystein II, King of Norway; Illegitimate: Sigurd II, King of Norway; Magnus, King of Norway; Brigida, Queen of Sweden
- House: Gille
- Father: Magnus III of Norway (claimed)

Harald Gille (Old Norse: Haraldr Gilli / Haraldr Gillikristr, c. 1102 − 14 December 1136), also known as Harald IV, was king of Norway from 1130 until his death. His byname Gille is probably from Middle Irish Gilla Críst 'servant of Christ'.

== Background ==
Harald was born ca. 1102 in Ireland or the Hebrides, more likely the former. According to the sagas, he became familiar with Norway through an acquaintance with Norwegian merchants including Rögnvald Kali Kolsson, who would later become Earl of Orkney. Around 1127, Harald went to Norway and declared he was an illegitimate son of the former king, Magnus Barefoot, who had visited Ireland just before his death in 1103. This is not implausible because other descendants of Magnus are reported in Irish sources and he is known to have been particularly fond of at least one Irish woman. Harald consequently claimed to be a half-brother of the reigning king, Sigurd the Crusader. Harald appears to have submitted successfully to the ordeal by fire. The alleged relationship was acknowledged by Sigurd on condition that Harald did not claim any share in the government of the kingdom during his lifetime or that of his son Magnus. Living on friendly terms with the king, Harald kept this agreement until Sigurd's death in 1130.

== Reign ==
Harald was in Tønsberg when he heard of King Sigurd's death. He called together a meeting at the Haugating (from the Old Norse word haugr meaning hill or burial mound). At this Thing, Harald was chosen king over half the country. King Magnus was obliged to divide the kingdom with Harald into two parts.

The kingdom accordingly was so divided that each of them should have the half part of the kingdom which King Sigurd had possessed. They ruled the country for some time in peace. After four years of uneasy peace, Magnus began to openly prepare for war on Harald. On 9 August 1134 he defeated Harald in a decisive Battle at Fyrisleif in Färlev, Bohuslän and Harald fled to Denmark. Subsequently, Magnus disbanded his army and traveled to Bergen to spend the winter there. Harald then returned to Norway with a new army and meeting little opposition, reached Bergen before Christmas. Since Magnus had few men, the city fell easily to Harald's army on 7 January 1135. Magnus was captured and dethroned. His eyes were put out, and he was thrown into prison. Harald now ruled the country until 1136, when he was murdered by Sigurd Slembe, another alleged illegitimate son of Magnus Barefoot.

== Personal life ==
Harald was married to Ingrid Ragnvaldsdotter, daughter of Ragnvald Ingesson, the son and heir of Inge the Elder. Harald had a son, Inge I of Norway, with her. According to the sagas, Harald had previously been married to Bjaðǫk, mother of his son, Eystein II of Norway. Among Harald's concubines was Thora Guttormsdotter (Þóra Guthormsdóttir), the daughter of Guttorm Gråbarde, who was the mother of Sigurd II of Norway. He also had a son, Magnus Haraldsson of Norway, who died in 1145 at 10 years of age. All four sons were kings of Norway.

== Historical context ==
Approximately from his accession to the throne, the civil wars period of Norwegian history started, that lasted from 1130 to 1217. During this period there were several interlocked conflicts of varying scale and intensity. The background for these conflicts were the unclear Norwegian succession laws, social conditions and the struggle between Church and King. There were two main parties, firstly known by varying names or no names at all, but finally condensed into parties of Bagler and Birkebeiner. The rallying point regularly was a royal son, who was set up as the head figure of the party in question, to oppose the rule of the king from the contesting party.

Harald Gille Gille dynasty Born: c. 1103 Died: 14 December 1136
Regnal titles
| Preceded by Sigurd the Crusader | King of Norway; 1130–1136 with Magnus IV (1130–1135) | Succeeded by Sigurd II & Inge I |
