= Magnus Erlingsson =

King of Norway from 1161 to 1184

King of Norway
- Reign: 1161 – 15 June 1184
- Coronation: 1163/1164, in Bergen
- Predecessor: Inge I and Haakon II
- Successor: Sverre
- Born: 1156; Etne, Hordaland
- Died: 15 June 1184 (aged 27–28); Fimreite
- Burial: Bergen
- Spouse: Estrid Bjørnsdotter
- Issue: Sigurd Magnusson; Inge Magnusson (claimed); Erling Steinvegg (claimed)
- House: Hardrada
- Father: Erling Skakke
- Mother: Kristin Sigurdsdatter

Magnus Erlingsson (Old Norse: Magnús, 1156 – 15 June 1184), also known as Magnus V, was a king of Norway during the civil war era in Norway. He helped to establish primogeniture in royal succession in Norway. King Magnus was killed in the Battle of Fimreite in 1184 against the forces of Sverre Sigurdsson who became King of Norway.

== Biography ==
Magnus Erlingsson was probably born in Etne in Hordaland. He was the son of Erling Skakke, a Norwegian nobleman who earned his reputation crusading with Rögnvald Kali Kolsson, the earl of Orkney. Magnus's mother, Kristin, was the daughter of Sigurd the Crusader, who was the king of Norway from 1103 to 1130. Magnus Erlingsson was named king in 1161 at the age of five. He was the first Norwegian king to be crowned. His father Erling took the title of earl and held the real power since Magnus was a minor. Erling Skakke continued to be the country’s real ruler even after Magnus had come of age.

Magnus' reign saw the arrival in Norway of Sverre Sigurdsson, who claimed the throne for himself as an allegedly illegitimate son of a previous king.

Several more years of warfare ended with Magnus' defeat and death in the Battle of Fimreite on June 15, 1184.

== Other sources ==
- Snorre Sturlason, The Heimskringla: A History of the Norse Kings, vol. 3 (London: Norroena Society, 1907)
- Finlay, Alison editor and translator Fagrskinna, a Catalogue of the Kings of Norway (Brill Academic. 2004)
- Gjerset, Knut History of the Norwegian People (The MacMillan Company, Volume I. 1915)
- Heggland, Johannes Den unge kongen (Eide Forlag, 1999) Norwegian

Magnus Erlingsson House of Hardrada Cadet branch of the Fairhair dynasty Born: 1156 Died: 15 June 1184
Regnal titles
Preceded by Inge I & Haakon II	King of Norway; 1161–1184 with Haakon II (1161–1162)	Succeeded by Sverre
