= Bjaðmunjo Mýrjartaksdóttir =

Irish princess

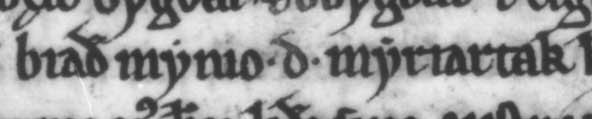
- Bjaðmunjo's name as it appears on folio 34r of AM 47 fol (Eirspennill): "Biaðmynio d Myriartak".
- Spouse: Sigurðr Magnússon
- House: Uí Briain
- Father: Muirchertach Ua Briain

Bjaðmunjo Mýrjartaksdóttir (Gaelic: Blathmuine ingen Muirchertach; fl. 1102/1103) was a daughter of a Muirchertach Ua Briain, High King of Ireland. (Note: Bjaðmunjo has been accorded various personal names: Bé Muman, Bébinn, Ben Mumain, Ben Muman, Biadmuin, Biadmunio, Biadmynia, Bjaðminja, Bjadmunju, Bjaðmynja, Bjadmynja, Bladmynja, Bláthmín, and Blathmuine. Bjaðmunjo has been accorded various patronyms: Bjaðmunjo Mýrjartaksdóttir, and Blathmuine Ní Bhriain.) In 1102, whilst still a child, she was married to Sigurðr, son of Magnús Óláfsson, King of Norway. At this time, Magnús appears to have been in the process of setting up his son as king over the Earldom of Orkney, the Kingdom of the Isles, and the Kingdom of Dublin. The marriage temporarily bound Muirchertach and Magnús together as allies before the latter's death the following year. Sigurðr thereupon repudiated Bjaðmunjo, and left for Scandinavia, where he proceeded to share the Norwegian kingship with his brothers.

== Background ==
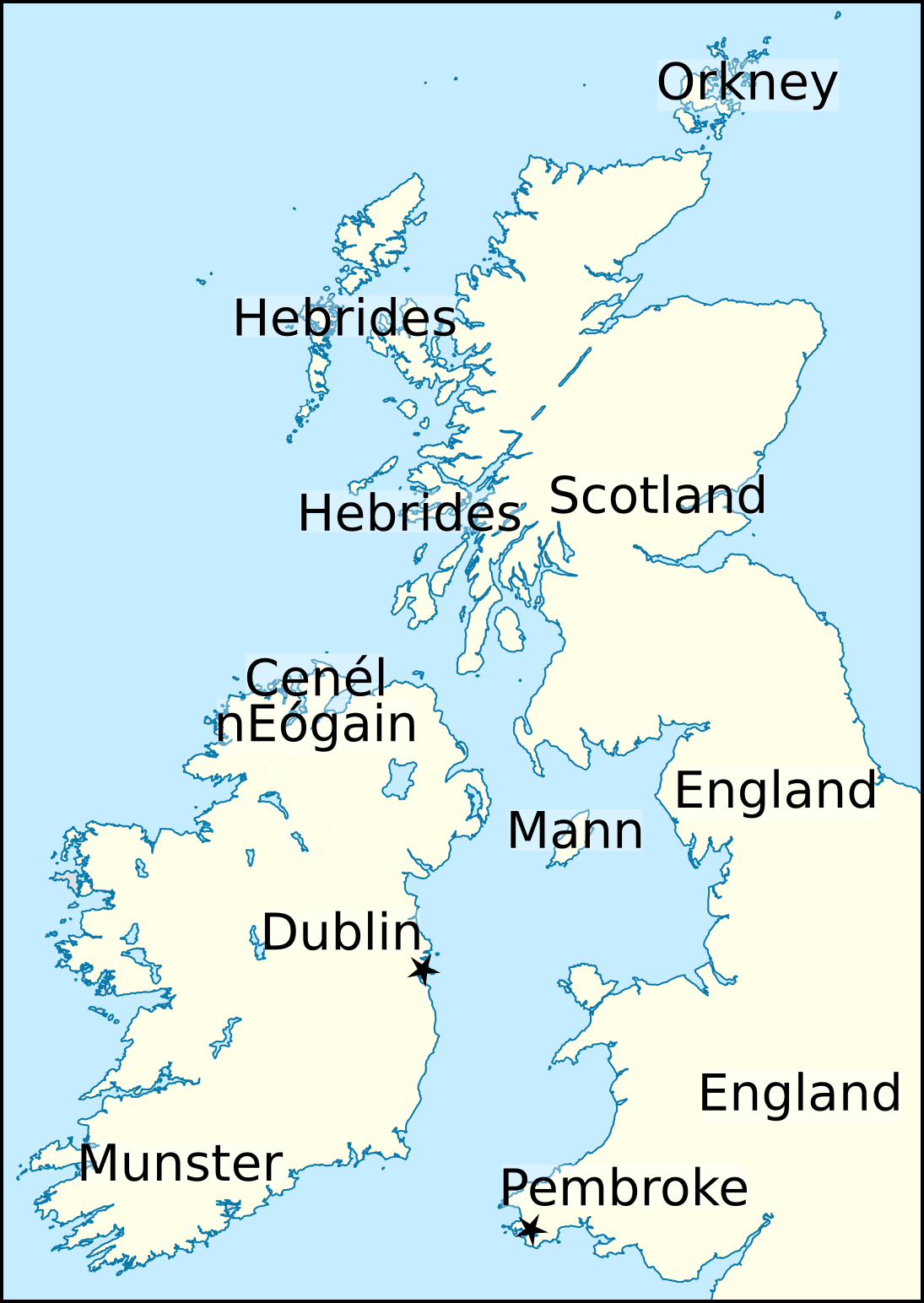
Locations relating to Bjaðmunjo's life and times.

Bjaðmunjo was a daughter of Muirchertach Ua Briain, High King of Ireland. In the late eleventh century, following the death of his father, Muirchertach seized control of the Kingdom of Munster and moved to extend his authority throughout Ireland as High King of Ireland. In so doing, he gained control of the Norse-Gaelic Kingdom of Dublin, and as a result began to extend his influence into the nearby Kingdom of the Isles. There is uncertainty concerning the political situation in the Isles in the last decade of the eleventh century. What is known for sure is that, before the end of the century, Magnús Óláfsson, King of Norway led a marauding fleet from Scandinavia into the Irish Sea region, where he held power until his death in 1103.

The catalyst for this Norwegian intervention may have been the extension of Muirchertach's influence into the Irish Sea region following the death of Gofraid Crobán, King of the Isles. The region appears to have degenerated into chaos following Gofraid's demise, and Magnús seems to have taken it upon himself to reassert Norwegian authority. Magnús made two expeditions into the Irish Sea region. One arrived in 1098; the other in 1102. The focus of the second overseas operation appears to have been Ireland itself. Following an apparent Norwegian conquest of Dublin, Magnús and Muirchertach negotiated a peace agreement, sealed through the marriage of Magnús' son, Sigurðr, and Bjaðmunjo herself.

== Marriage ==
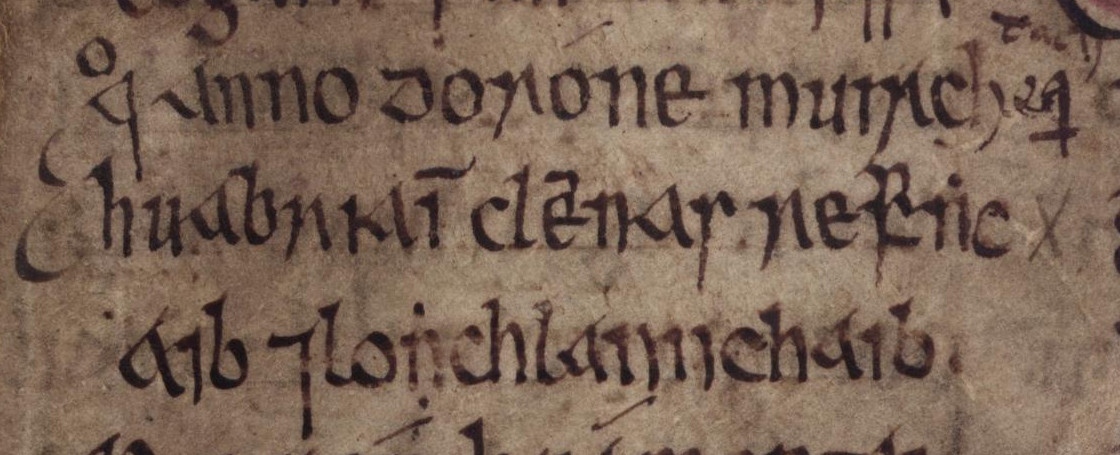
Excerpt from folio 32r of Oxford Bodleian Library Rawlinson B 503 (the Annals of Inisfallen) concerning the two marital alliances conducted by Muirchertach in 1102.

The marriage agreement between Magnús and Muirchertach is noted in several sources. The Annals of Inisfallen and the Annals of the Four Masters reveal that the marriage took place in 1102. Other sources reporting the marriage include the twelfth-century Ágrip af Nóregskonungasǫgum, the thirteenth-century Orkneyinga saga, and Magnúss saga berfœtts within the thirteenth-century Heimskringla. (Note: The forms of Bjaðmunjo's name in these Scandinavian sources suggest that they may represent the Gaelic Bé Binn, a name known to have been borne by other members of the Uí Briain. Other Gaelic names equated to that of Bjaðmunjo include Ben Muman (or Bé Muman, Ben Mumain and Bean-Mumham), Blathmuine, Blath-Mumham, and Bláthmín.) Sigurðr was apparently twelve years old at the time of the marriage, although Bjaðmunjo's age is uncertain. The remarkably young age of the newlyweds, and the fact that the union is recorded at all in historical sources, suggests that a dynastic marriage was required for the conclusion of peace between their fathers.

There seems to be some confusion in several historical sources regarding the marriage. For example, the twelfth-century Historia ecclesiastica states that Magnús himself married the daughter of an Irish king in about 1093. According to Morkinskinna, Magnús was at one point set to marry a certain Maktildr, described as an "emperor's daughter". It is possible that Maktildr represents Matilda, a woman who was a sister of the reigning Étgar mac Maíl Choluim, King of Scotland, and who is known to have married Henry I, King of England in 1110. In fact, the episode concerning Magnús and Maktildr in Morkinskinna may have influenced the erroneous claim preserved by the same source and the thirteenth-century Fagrskinna, that Sigurðr married a daughter of Máel Coluim mac Donnchada, King of Scotland. At about the same time as the marriage between Bjaðmunjo and Sigurðr, the former's father secured yet another marital alliance through another daughter and Arnulf de Montgomery, Earl of Pembroke, an English magnate in the midst of a revolt against the reigning King of England.

== Ramifications ==
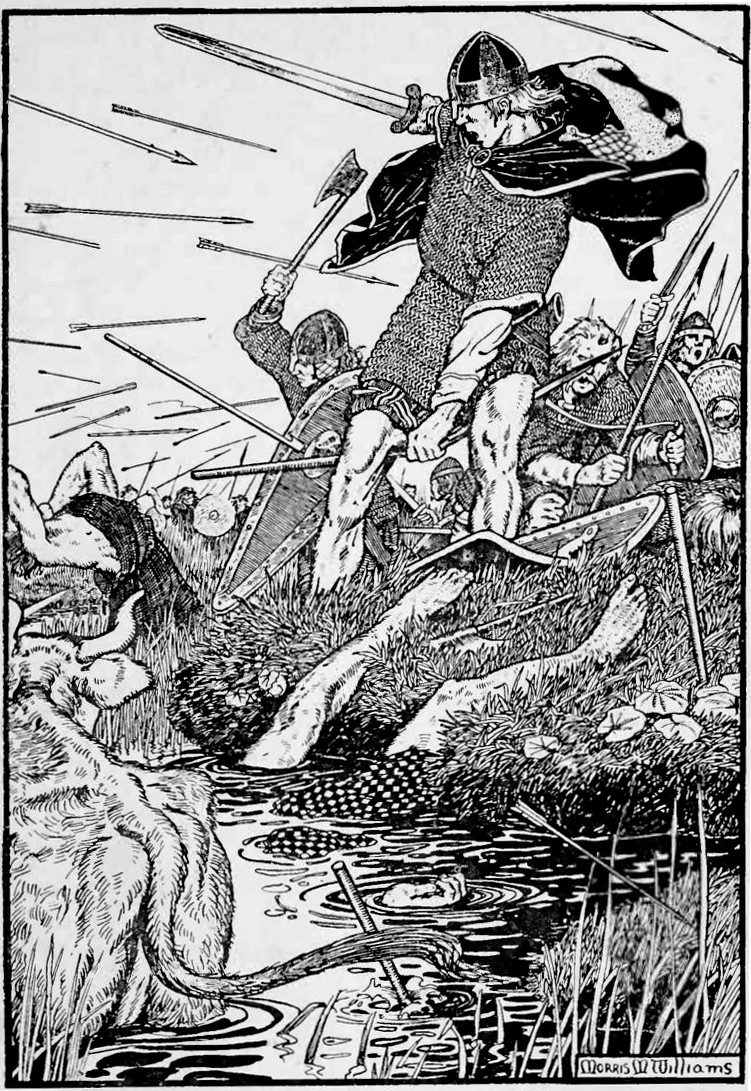
An early twentieth-century depiction of Magnús Óláfsson's death in battle.

Just prior to the settlement of peace between the Uí Briain and the Norwegians, Muirchertach was not only contending with the arrival of Magnús, but was also locked in an extended struggle with Domnall Mac Lochlainn, King of Cenél nEógain. The agreement of a year's peace between Muirchertach and Magnús, however, turned Magnús from an enemy into an ally. Whilst Magnús appears to have intended for Sigurðr to rule over his recently won overseas territories—a region stretching from Orkney to Dublin—Muirchertach appears to have intended to exert influence into the Isles through his new son-in-law. In fact, during the following year, Muirchertach and Magnús cooperated in military operations throughout Ireland. Unfortunately for Muirchertach, and his long-term ambitions in Ireland and the Isles, Magnús was slain in Ulster in 1103. Thereupon Morkinskinna and Fagrskinna reveal that Sigurðr immediately repudiated Bjaðmunjo—their marriage apparently having been unconsummated—and returned to Norway. There Sigurðr proceeded to share the Norwegian kingship with his two brothers, Eysteinn and Óláfr. It was over one hundred and fifty years until another King of Norway ventured into the Isles.

== See also ==
- Bjaðǫk, a Gaelic wife/mistress/concubine of Haraldr gilli, King of Norway. Haraldr gilli himself claimed to be a son of Magnús by another Gaelic woman.
