= Bethóc (disambiguation) =

Bethóc may refer to:

- Bethóc, daughter of Malcolm II, King of Scots
- Bethóc, Prioress of Iona, daughter of Somerled, Lord of Argyll
- Bjaðǫk, Queen of Norway, wife of Harald IV of Norway
