= Hartford Symphony Orchestra (1925–1927) =

American orchestra

The Hartford Symphony Orchestra, formerly of Hartford, Connecticut, United States, was a professional symphony organization founded in 1925 by bandleader George W.C. Matz of the same city.

It was the direct successor to the Hartford Philharmonic Orchestra, disbanded in 1922. It was active from 1925 until 1927, providing regional symphony orchestra concerts in Connecticut. It was among the first symphony orchestras to be remotely broadcast via radio and the third-oldest symphony orchestra active in Connecticut following the New Haven Symphony and Hartford Philharmonic.

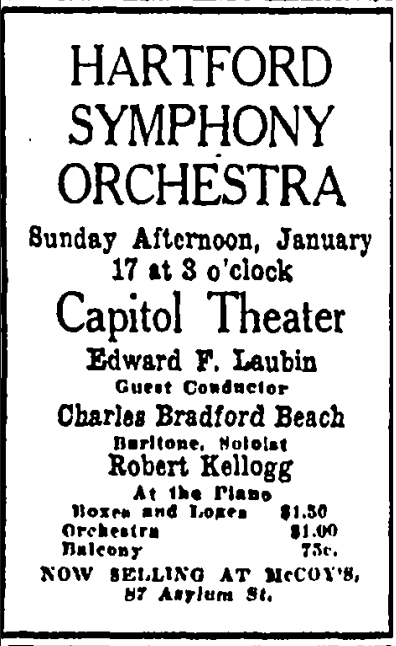
Advertisement for a concert by the Hartford Symphony Orchestra, 1926

== Founding ==
Following the disbandment of the Hartford Philharmonic Orchestra, a number of supporters of the performing arts with ties to Connecticut and beyond met to organize a second classical music ensemble outside of New York and Boston. This led to the formation of the first Hartford Symphony Orchestra on February 18, 1925, in Hartford, Connecticut. Its organization was headed by local bandleader and musician George W.C. Matz, the first president, and Samuel J. Levanthal, vice president and concertmaster. Its creation was partly inspired by a concert given at S. Z. Poli's Capitol Theatre in Hartford by the Boston Symphony Orchestra. Among its founders was Angelo Coniglione, former leader of the Foot Guard Band and later the first conductor of the separate Hartford Symphony Orchestra organized in 1934. Local concert manager Robert Kellogg was also a supporter of the symphony.

== First season ==
The symphony's 1924–1925 season was focused on establishment as a professional symphony orchestra to the Greater Hartford region, initially establishing a series of Sunday afternoon concerts. Louis Eaton, former head of the Hartford Conservatory of Music violin department, guest conducted the first concert. The orchestra consisted of about 80 professional musicians, who largely volunteered their services. Their first concert was held at Poli's Capitol Theater in Hartford on March 22, 1925, featuring harp soloist Mary C. Magnelli. Jules Massenet's Phèdre: Overture, Shubert's Symphony No. 8, selections from Henry Hadley's suite Silhouettes, "To a Wild Rose" by Edward MacDowell, "The Little Butterfly" by Antonin Razek, "Cheyenne War Dance" by Charles Sanford Skilton and Theodore Dubois' Fantasie triomphale were on the first program.

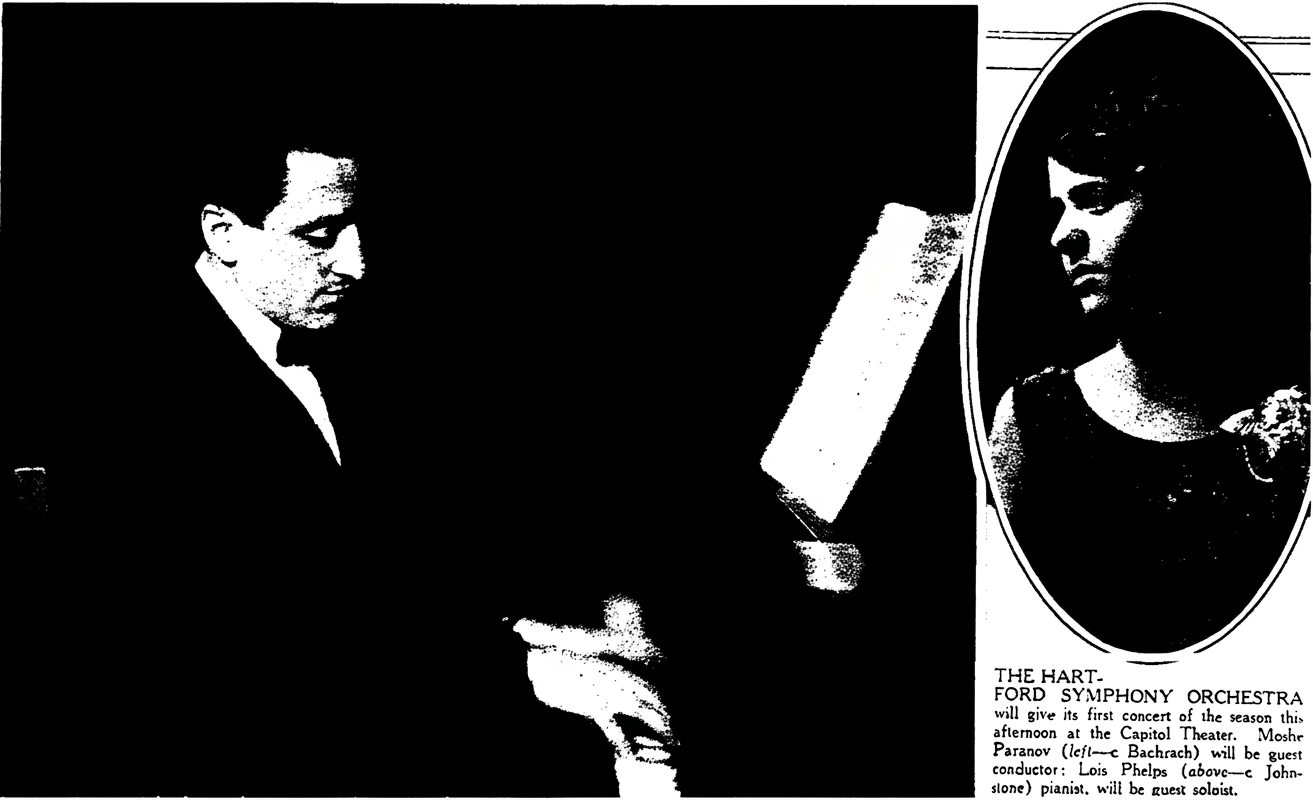
Newspaper photos of Moshe Paranov and pianist Lois Phelps, 1925

== Future concerts and reorganization ==
The Hartford Symphony opened their second season in November 1925. The first concert was conducted by Moshe Paranov, at the time assistant director of The Julius Hartt School of Music. This concert was well received and widely reviewed. Lois Phelps, guest pianist, performed the Concerto in A minor by Grieg with the symphony. This concert was followed by a performance given on January 17, 1926, conducted by Edward F. Laubin, former organist of Asylum Hill Congregational Church in Hartford and choral conductor of the Hartford Oratorio Society. The final concert of the Hartford Symphony's 1925–1926 season was conducted by Moshe Paranov, for the second time, and was notably attended by composer Rubin Goldmark for a performance of his A Negro Rhapsody. Beethoven's "Coriolanus" Overture and Grieg's Sigurd Jorsalfar, Op. 22, was also on the program. The concert was remotely broadcast by radio station WTIC.

An informal concert was given under the direction of Samuel Levanthal, concertmaster of the Hartford Symphony Orchestra, that same year for the opening of the Hartford Saengerbund club, featuring soloists from prior symphony concerts. Levanthal continued leading concerts under the name of the 'Hartford Symphony Ensemble' in 1926 and 1927. Former president George Matz had removed to New York State by 1926.

The orchestra underwent a change of leadership and reorganization as the 'Hartford Philharmonic Society Symphony' in 1927, and was to be conducted by Clarence J. Madsen. The reorganization was initially supported by Dana S. Merriman, conductor of a radio symphony and music supervisor at station WTIC. The first concert under new leadership was to be given November 15, 1927. The committee at this time included Edward N. Allen, former conductors of the Hartford Philharmonic John Spencer Camp and Robert H. Prutting, Samuel J. Levanthal, the Julius Hartt School of Music, the Hartford Conservatory and a number of local business and music leaders. The new concert series did not take place, however.

A short-lived orchestra of the same name was organized in 1931, and conducted by cellist Franz Carl Lorenz. This orchestra played their first concert at the former State Normal School in New Britain, Connecticut, and also gave one of the first symphony concerts in public parks at Colt Park in Hartford in 1931, predating the introduction of a park concert series by the Hartford Symphony Orchestra.

Many musicians who played in the first Hartford Symphony later joined the State Theater Orchestra in 1926 and the Civic Symphony Orchestra of Hartford or Hartford Symphony Orchestra founded in 1934, including violinist Rubin Segal, violinists and future conductors George Heck and Jacques Gordon, horn player Herbert E. Holtz and clarinetist Sebastiano Cassarino.

== See also ==
- List of symphony orchestras in the United States
- Music of Connecticut
