= Bjaðǫk =

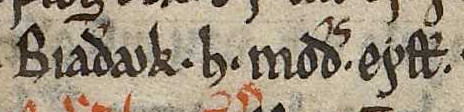
- The names of Bjaðǫk and Eysteinn Haraldsson as they appear on folio 73r of AM 45 fol (Codex Frisianus): "Biaðak het moðir Eysteins". The excerpt describes Bjaðǫk as Eysteinn's mother.
- Spouse: Haraldr gilli
- Issue: Eysteinn Haraldsson

Bjaðǫk was a twelfth-century woman purported to have been the mother of Eysteinn Haraldsson, King of Norway. (Note: Since the 1980s, Bjaðǫk has been variously known in English scholarly secondary sources as: Biadok, Bjaðǫk, Bjaðok, Bjaðök. Bjadok, and Blathac.) In the first half of the twelfth century, Eysteinn was brought to Norway and claimed to be the son of his royal predecessor, Haraldr gilli, King of Norway. The latter was himself the son of a Gaelic woman, and claimed to be the son of an earlier king. The claims of Bjaðǫk and Eysteinn were accepted, and the latter went on to rule as king for fifteen years. Bjaðǫk's name could to be an Old Norse form of a Gaelic name, and she may well have been a member of a prominent family. According to modern tradition, Haraldr gilli's wife was an aunt of Somairle mac Gilla Brigte, King of the Isles, although whether this tradition is authentic is uncertain.

== Norwegian royal family ==
Simplified pedigree illustrating the parentage of Haraldr gilli and Eysteinn Haraldsson, and their kinship with contemporary Norwegian kings. Women are italicised and highlighted.

Magnús berfættr	unknown woman
Sigurðr Jórsalafari	Haraldr gilli	Bjaðǫk
Sigurðr munnr	Ingi	Eysteinn

== Eysteinn's mother ==
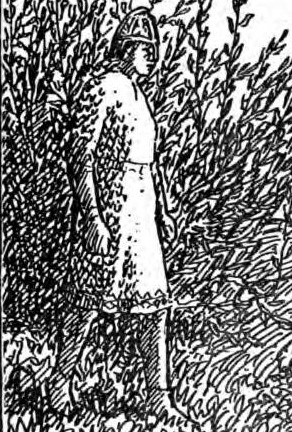
Nineteenth-century depiction of Bjaðǫk's son, Eysteinn Haraldsson.

Eysteinn Haraldsson (died 1157) was a son of Bjaðǫk and Haraldr gilli, King of Norway (died 1136). Following Haraldr gilli's death, two of his sons, Sigurðr munnr (died 1155) and Ingi (died 1161), jointly ruled the Norwegian realm as kings. (Note: Sigurðr munnr and Ingi had different mothers.) According to Haraldssona saga within the thirteenth-century saga-compilation Heimskringla, in 1142 Eysteinn and Bjaðǫk were brought to Norway from west-over-sea by three prominent men of the realm: Árni sturla, Þorleifr Brynjólfsson, and Kolbeinn hrúga. Eysteinn was thence put forward as an adult son of Haraldr gilli who deserved a share of the kingdom. Once his claim was accepted, Eysteinn was recognised as king. The thirteenth-century texts Fagrskinna and Morkinskinna give similar accounts although these sources do not identify Bjaðǫk by name. In fact, her name appears to correspond to either the Gaelic Blathach, Bláthóc, or Bethóc.

Overseas sexual encounters between Norwegian royals and foreign women was evidently not an uncommon occurrence at the time. Certainly, the thirteenth-century Chronica of Roger de Hoveden (died 1201/1202) pointedly remarks upon the low-status of the mothers of Norwegian monarchs. Such relationships offered young women an opportunity to produce a royal son, and thereby procure preferment for herself and her family. Whether the women concerned actually pursued such schemes themselves is uncertain, and it is possible that they were instead selected by the kings themselves or proffered by their own families. In any case, it is conceivable that Eysteinn and Bjaðǫk enjoyed the support of influential relatives who backed their claims. Despite his apparent Gaelic background, however, there is no hint of Eysteinn's interest in his homeland after his arrival in Scandinavia. Eysteinn jointly ruled as king with his brothers until the end of his life.

One episode that may have bearing on Eysteinn's Gaelic heritage is his raiding expedition along the eastern British coast in about 1151. At about this time, Guðrøðr Óláfsson (died 1187), son and heir of the reigning King of the Isles, visited Norway and rendered homage to Ingi. Guðrøðr's Scandinavian stay coincided with that of Nicholas Breakspeare, Cardinal-Bishop of Albano (died 1159), an Englishman who became pope in 1154. The latter was instrumental in the creation of the Norwegian Archdiocese of Niðaróss, an ecclesiastical jurisdiction that officially included the Diocese of the Isles in 1154. Nicholas also apparently favoured Ingi as king over Eysteinn and Sigurðr munnr. Guðrøðr's cooperation with Ingi, therefore, could have been undertaken in the context of avoiding having to deal with Eysteinn and his seemingly Irish or Hebridean kin.

== Eysteinn's grandmother ==
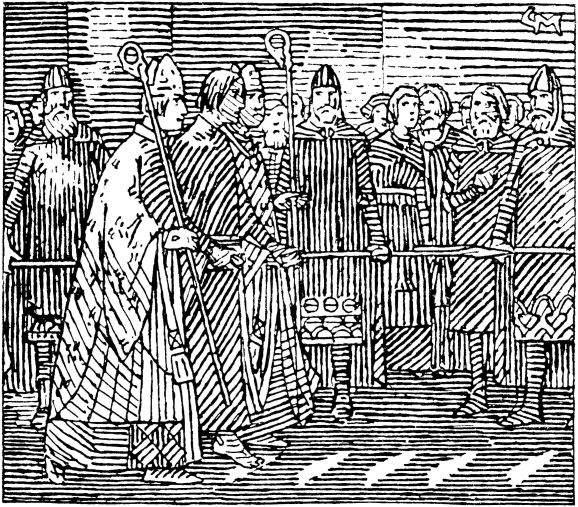
Nineteenth-century depiction of Haraldr gilli undergoing an ordeal to prove his paternity.

The story of how Eysteinn's father came to the kingship is similar to that of Eysteinn. At some point in the 1120s, Haraldr gilli arrived in Norway claiming to be a brother of the reigning king. The tale of Haraldr gilli's accession is preserved in several sources. According to Magnússona saga, within Heimskringla, a Norwegian baron named Hallkell húkr voyaged from Norway to the Isles where he encountered Haraldr gilli and his mother. Named Gillikristr by the saga, Haraldr gilli told Hallkell húkr that he was a son Magnús berfættr, King of Norway (died 1103), and that another name of his was Haraldr. In fact, Haraldr gilli's byname—gilli—is a shortened form of Gillikristr, an Old Norse form of the Gaelic personal name Gilla Críst. (Note: The name Gilla Críst means "servant of Christ". The name-element Gilla- was common in Gaelic personal names. Other examples include Gilla Patráic and Gilla Ísu. It is apparent that such names were shortened to Gilli by Scandinavian settlers in Britain and Ireland.) According to Magnússona saga, Haraldr gilli was originally from Ireland, and both he and his mother were subsequently conveyed to Norway by Hallkell húkr, who presented them to Magnús' reigning son, Sigurðr Jórsalafari, King of Norway (died 1130). Fagrskinna and Morkinskinna give similar accounts, with the latter source calling him Haraldr Gillikristr. Some years before his arrival, whilst only a teenager, the thirteenth-century Orkneyinga saga indicates that Haraldr gilli encountered Kali Kolsson (died 1158) at Grimsby, where he revealed to Kali his parentage, as a descendant of Magnús and an Isleswoman. According to Magnússona saga, and the twelfth-century Historia de antiquitate regum Norwagiensium, after Haraldr gilli's arrival in Norway from Ireland or Scotia respectively, Sigurðr Jórsalafari had Haraldr gilli undergo an ordeal in which the latter was to walk upon nine red-hot ploughshares. The latter source further states that it was believed that Haraldr gilli was divinely aided since he emerged from his ordeal unburnt. (Note: Scandinavian sources relevant to Haraldr gilli reveal that he was regarded as a foreigner by Norwegians. Specifically, he is stated to have spoken the Norwegians' native language poorly. This suggests that Haraldr gilli's own native language was Gaelic. Both Eysteinn and his grandfather, Haraldr gilli, were noted to have been darker than their peers. For example, appearance (including his dark hair and eyes) is noted; whilst Eysteinn's dark and curly hair is contrasted with the fair hair of his half-brother, Sigurðr munnr.)

Since Haraldr gilli's mother evidently travelled with him to Norway, and Sigurðr Jórsalafari is known to have spent time in Ireland as a child, it is possible that Sigurðr Jórsalafari recognised her as a former lover of his father. (Note: In fact, a piece of poetry ascribed to Magnús refers to an Irish lover, and declares that Magnús left his heart in Dublin.) The accounts of Eysteinn's father gaining royal recognition illustrate that, although such claimants sometimes had to undergo ordeals to prove their paternity, the testimony of their foreign mothers also carried weight in the final decision. Nevertheless, not only did claimants to throne need to prove their paternity, they needed to also gain the acceptance of an assembled þing in a process known as konungstekja. Having gaining approval of such an assembly, a successful claimant would have sworn an oath to uphold the national law, whereupon he would have received an oath of allegiance from the assembly itself. Eysteinn and Haraldr gilli lived during a remarkable period of Norwegian history in which civil warring waged for nearly a century, from 1130 to 1240. No less than forty-six candidates emerged seeking recognition as king during this period. Although twenty-four of these candidates succeeded, only two gained royal authority throughout the realm. In fact, only one king from this period, Ingi, was the legitimate son of a king.

== Later tradition ==
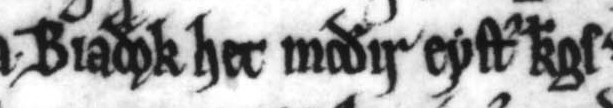
The names of Bjaðǫk and Eysteinn as they appear on folio 56v of AM 47 fol (Eirspennill): "Biaðǫk het moðir Eysteins konvngs".

According to a much later tradition, dated to turn of the twentieth century and perhaps as early as the late eighteenth century, the grandfather of Somairle mac Gilla Brigte, King of the Isles (died 1164), Gilla Adamnáin, had a daughter who married a Norwegian king—a king who seemingly corresponds to Haraldr gilli himself. Although there is no way to confirm the claim itself, such a union is not implausible, and may correspond to the relationship between Bjaðǫk and Haraldr gilli. Certainly, Somairle himself had a daughter named Bethóc. Nevertheless, the notion of an affiliation with Somairle's family postdates the printing of Heimskringla, which could suggest that this source spawned ideas of a familial connection.

== See also ==
- Bjaðmunjo Mýrjartaksdóttir, a daughter of Muirchertach Ua Briain, High King of Ireland (died 1119). She was married to Sigurðr Jórsalafari whilst still a child.
