= Haakon Toresfostre =

King of Norway from 1093 to 1095

Haakon Magnusson

King of Norway
- Reign: 1093 – February 1095
- Predecessor: Olaf III
- Successor: Magnus III
- Co-ruler: Magnus III
- Born: 1069
- Died: February 1095 (aged 25–26); Dovrefjell
- House: Hardrada
- Father: Magnus II of Norway

Haakon Magnusson (Old Norse: Hákon Magnússon: Norwegian: Håkon Magnusson; 1068 – February 1095), byname Toresfostre (Old Norse: Þórisfóstra, meaning "fostered by Tore"), was King of Norway from 1093 to 1095. Haakon was only partially recognized within Norway and his reign was thus of limited significance. He has generally not been counted in the numbered series of Norwegian kings.

== Life ==
He was the grandson of King Harald Hardrada, son of King Magnus and nephew of King Olaf Kyrre. Haakon was born around the same time his father died. He was raised as a foster son by Tore på Steig of Gudbrandsdalen on the farm Steig in Fron. In 1090, he undertook a Viking expedition to Bjarmaland, today the area of Arkhangelsk in northern Russia.

After the death of Olav Kyrre he was hailed as King of Norway in Trondheim, while his cousin, King Magnus Barefoot, was hailed in Viken. He soon came into conflict with King Magnus and war seemed inevitable. In 1095, Magnus Berrføtt prepared an armed action against Haakon, but was surprised by the strong position held by his cousin. When Haakon learned that Magnus had come to Trondheim, he went across the Dovrefjell mountain range. However, Haakon suddenly died during the trip over Dovrefjell. Magnus subsequently ruled as sole king of Norway. He captured Tore på Steig who was subsequently hanged. He was buried in Christ Church in Trondheim.

Haakon Magnusson House of Hardrada Cadet branch of the Fairhair dynasty Born: 1069 Died: February 1095
Regnal titles
Preceded by Olaf III	King of Norway; 1093–1095 with Magnus III	Succeeded by Magnus III
