= Assassination of Ingimundr =

1097 murder in Lewis, Scotland

Ingimundr
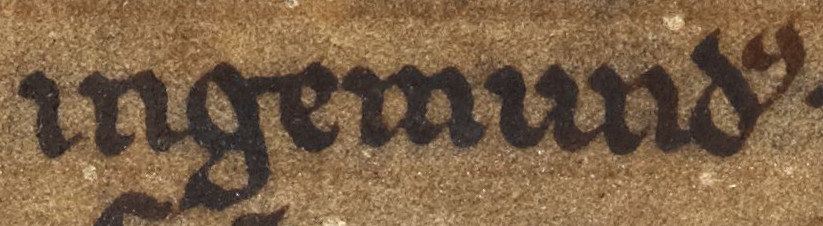
- Ingimundr's name as it appears on folio 34r of British Library Cotton Julius A VII (the Chronicle of Mann): "Ingemundus".
- Died: 1097; Lewis

Ingimundr, also known as Ingimund, and Ingemund, was an eleventh-century delegate of Magnús Óláfsson, King of Norway. In the last decade of the eleventh century, Ingimundr was tasked by Magnús to take control of the Kingdom of the Isles. The realm had descended into utter chaos after the death of Guðrøðr Crovan, King of the Isles in 1095, which was followed by kin-strife amongst Guðrøðr's descendants, and the encroachment of Irish authority into the region. Ingimundr and his followers were slain in Lewis by the leading Islesmen whilst he was in the midst of securing the kingship. The following year, Magnús took matters into his own hands, and personally oversaw the conquest of the Isles himself.

== Background: anarchy in the Isles ==
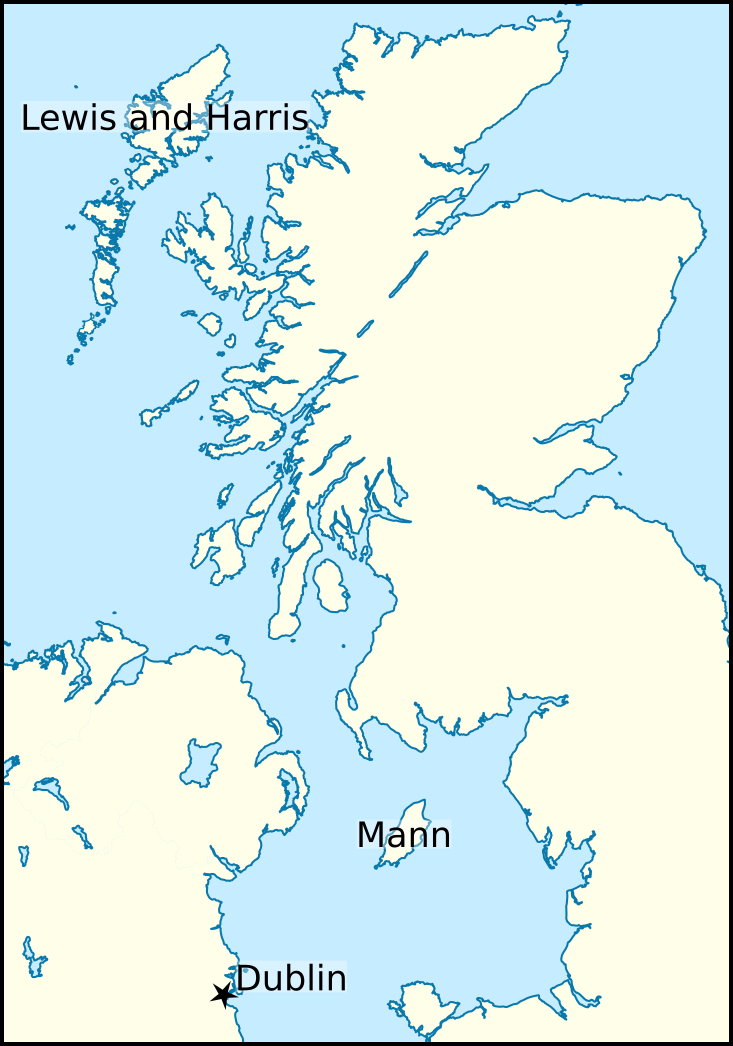
Locations relating to Ingimundr's life and times.

In the 1070s, Guðrøðr Crovan secured the kingship of the Isles through his conquest of Mann, and forcefully added Dublin to his realm in about 1091. Guðrøðr's undoing came in 1094, when he was driven out of Ireland by the Uí Briain, and died the following year in the Hebrides. There is uncertainty concerning the political situation in the Isles in the last decade of the eleventh century. What is known for sure is that, before the end of the century, Magnús Óláfsson, King of Norway (died 1103) led a marauding fleet from Scandinavia into the Isles, seized control of the kingdom, and held power in the Irish Sea region until his death in 1103. According to the thirteenth–fourteenth-century Chronicle of Mann, when Guðrøðr died in 1095, Lǫgmaðr succeeded him as his eldest son, and went on to reign for seven years. The numerical calculations and chronology of this source are suspect, and it is uncertain if Lǫgmaðr's reign began before Magnús' arrival, during Magnús' overlordship, or even after Magnús' death. Despite the uncertainty surrounding the inception of his reign, the chronicle reveals that Lǫgmaðr faced continued opposition from within his own family, in the form of an ongoing rebellion by his brother, Haraldr.

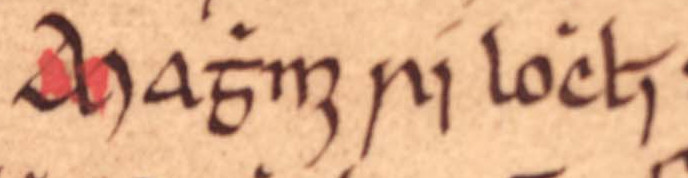
The name and title of Ingimundr's sovereign, Magnús Óláfsson, as it appears on folio 46v of Oxford Bodleian Library Rawlinson B 489 (the Annals of Ulster).

Although the Chronicle of Man maintains that Lǫgmaðr voluntarily vacated his throne, there is reason to suspect that he was forced from power. In about 1096 the chronicle claims that the leading Islesmen sought assistance of Muirchertach Ua Briain, King of Munster (died 1119), and petitioned him to provide a regent from his own kin to govern the kingdom until Lǫgmaðr's younger brother, Óláfr (died 1153), was old enough to assume control. The chronicle's account could be evidence that, by about 1096, Lǫgmaðr faced a faction formed around Óláfr; and that, when this bloc was unable to topple Lǫgmaðr by itself, it approached Muirchertach for assistance in placing Óláfr upon the throne. In any case, the chronicle reveals that Muirchertach then installed Domnall mac Taidc (died 1115) upon the throne. The slaying of Domnall's brother, Amlaíb, as recorded by the seventeenth-century Annals of the Four Masters in 1096, suggests that Domnall and his immediate family faced significant opposition in the Isles, possibly in the form of Lǫgmaðr's adherents. The chronicle credits Domnall with an oppressive three-year reign that ended when the leading Islesmen revolted against him, and drove him from the kingdom back to Ireland.

== Ingimundr's arrival in the Isles ==
The extent of Domnall's rule in the kingdom is unknown, and it is questionable whether he had any real authority in the northern Hebrides, the islands furthest from Mann. In about 1097, Magnús sent Ingimundr to the Isles to take possession of the kingdom. After installing himself in Lewis, the chronicle reveals that Ingimundr was overthrown and killed whilst in the midst of securing the kingship.

And when he had arrived in the island of Lewis, he sent messengers to all the chieftains of the islands; ordering them to assemble together, and appoint him their king. But meanwhile he with his associates abandoned himself to robbery and banquetting; violated the chastity of women and girls; and devoted his attention to the other pleasures and allurements of the flesh. And when this had been reported to the chieftains of the islands, when they had already assembled together to appoint him king, they were fired with excessive rage, and hastened towards him; and coming upon him by night, they burned down the house in which he was; and annihilated him and all his men, some with the sword, and some in the flames.

— Chronicle of Mann, an excerpt concerning Ingimundr's arrival and ruination in the Isles. (Note: The chronicle is the only source that specifically makes note of Ingimundr.)

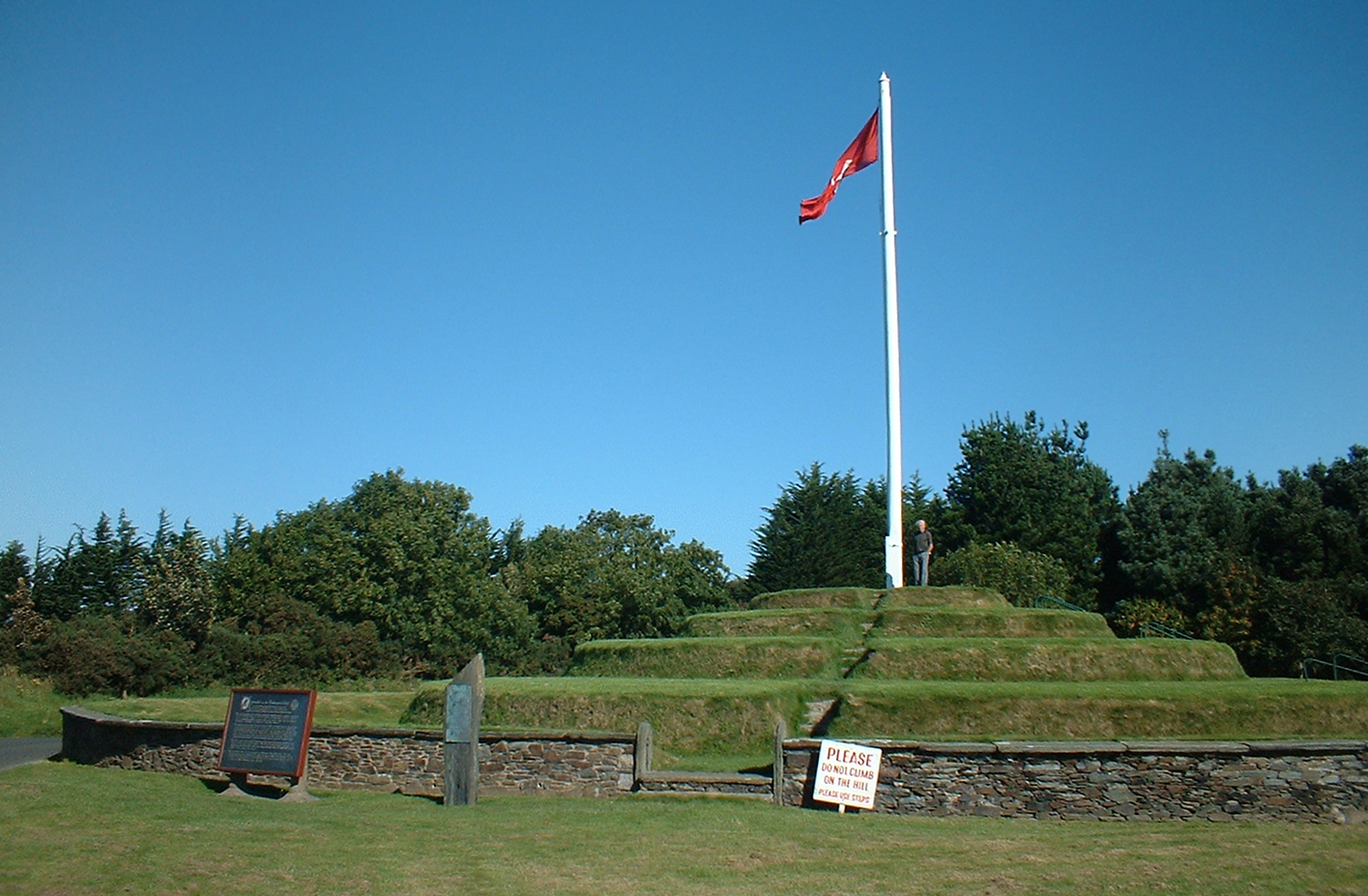
Tynwald Hill, on Mann, may have been a national assembly site of the Kingdom of the Isles. It may well have been the place where the Islesmen publicly inaugurated their kings, proclaimed new laws, and resolved disputes. In any event, much of the visible site dates only to the eighteenth-, nineteenth-, and twentieth century. (Note: Evidence of local assembly sites within the kingdom may exist in the Hebridean placenames Tiongal (known in Scottish Gaelic as Cnoc an Tiongalairidh) in Lewis (grid reference NB1937), and Tinwhil (perhaps grid reference NG415583) within the Hinnisdale area on Skye. Like the Manx site, these four Hebridean placenames are derived in part from the Old Norse þing ("assembly"). These sites, and others now lost, may have been established before the dominance of Manx-based kings and their national assembly site.)

Ingimundr's rationale for seating himself upon an island (Lewis and Harris) on the edge of the kingdom may have been due to his inability to gain any authority on Mann itself. (Note: Magnúss saga berfœtts, within the thirteenth-century Heimskringla, states that Mann was the best of all the Suðreyjar ("Southern Islands"). This Old Norse Suðreyjar refers to the Hebrides and Mann. The island of Lewis and Harris is divided in two: Lewis is northern part and Harris is the southern part.) The chronicle reveals that civil war erupted there the following year, and the twelfth-century Historia ecclesiastica indicates that Mann was devastated to point of being a virtual desert by the time Magnús appeared on the scene. The warring itself may have been related to the factional struggles between Guðrøðr's sons. Although it is possible that it was Magnús who actually forced Domnall from the Isles, the fact the chronicle makes no mention of Domnall during the recorded conflict on Mann may be evidence that he had lost control of the island by then. Within the year, the same source records the arrival of Magnús, which could suggest that it was Ingimundr's slaying, at the hands of the Islesmen, that had incited Magnús to take matters into his own hands.

There is little known of the inauguration of kings in the Isles. What is apparent, however, is that the so-called chieftains of the Isles—or principes Insularum—played a significant role in king-making. Although Guðrøðr had originally gained the kingship through conquest, the chronicle reveals that his later descendants relied upon legitimisation from the chieftains. For example, this source notes that it was the "noblemen of the Isles" who had approached Muirchertach to intervene in the Isles following the strife between Guðrøðr's sons, and it was "all the chieftains of the Isles" who drove (Muirchertach's delegate) Domnall from the Isles not long afterwards. Furthermore, following Magnús' eventual death in 1103, the chronicle records that it was the "chieftains of the Isles" who sent for (Guðrøðr's son) Óláfr to occupy the throne.
