= Ben Muman =

Ben Muman (Modern Irish: Bean Mhumhan) was an Old Irish feminine given name used during the medieval period. It has the anglicised form Benvon.

== People ==
- Ben Muman ingen meic Congaile, died 1058.
- Ben Muman Ní Cathan, died 1283.
- Ben Muman Ní Conchobair, died 1406.
- Ben Muman Bean Uí Donnchaidh, died 1411.
- Ben Muman Ní Chonchobair, died 1411.
- Ben Muman Ní Diarmata, died 1436.
- Ben Muman Ní Dhorchaidh, died 1441.
- Ben Muman Ní Flannagain, died 1464.
- Ben Muman Bean Uí Cellaigh, died 1468.
- Ben Muman Óge Ní Duibhgeannáin, died 1599.

== See also ==
- Bjaðmunjo Mýrjartaksdóttir, also known as Ben Muman
- List of Irish-language given names
