= Paul and Erlend Thorfinnsson =

Earl of Orkney

Paul Thorfinnsson (died 1098) and Erlend Thorfinnsson (died 1098) were brothers who ruled together as Earls of Orkney. Paul and Erlend were the sons of Thorfinn Sigurdsson and Ingibiorg Finnsdottir. Through Ingibiorg's father Finn Arnesson and his wife, the family was related to the Norwegian Kings Olav II and Harald II. They are both described as "tall, handsome men, shrewd and gentle, taking rather more after their mother's side of the family. Their lives and times are recounted in the Orkneyinga Saga, which was first written down in the early 13th century by an unknown Icelandic author.

== Appointment ==
The saga provides few accurate dates and it is not certain when Earl Thorfinn died, save that it was in the later days of Harald Hardrada. It is frequently stated that Thorfinn's demise was in 1065, but it may have been earlier. The Orkneyinga Saga fails to mention a campaign in the Irish Sea by Magnus Haraldsson in 1058 (which is the first such event attested in contemporary sources in the British Isles). Woolf (2007) suggests that Torfinn's death provoked Magnus's expedition and that this was the occasion on which Paul and Erlend Thorfinnsson submitted to Harald. Whatever the timing, on the death of their father, the brothers became joint earls, although Paul, who was the elder of the two, was "very much the one in charge".

== Battle of Stamford Bridge ==
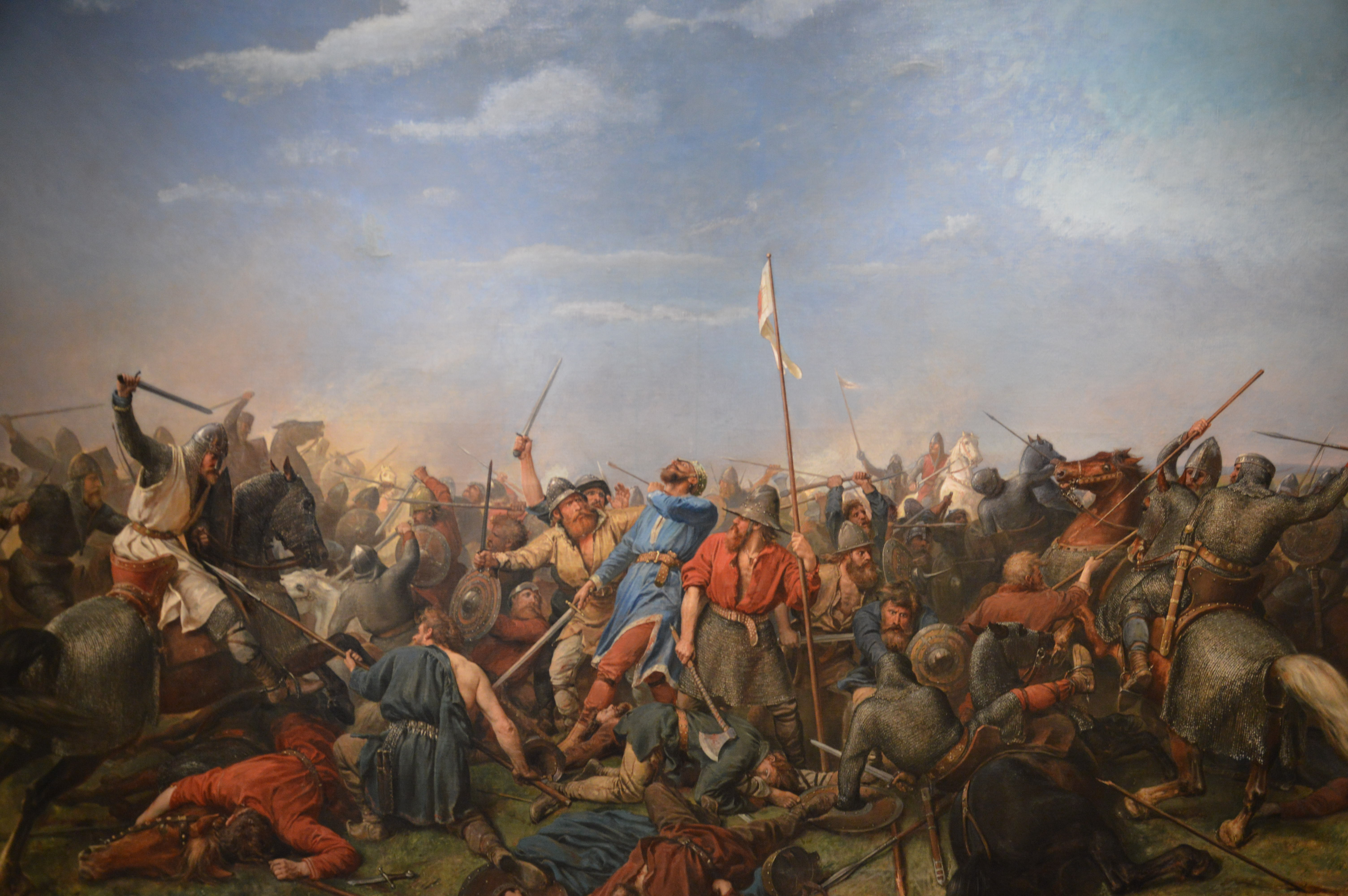
Battle of Stamford Bridge by Peter Nicolai Arbo

Soon after they became Earls, the brothers accompanied the Norwegian king Harald Hardrada and Tostig Godwinson on the ill-fated expedition to England in 1066. Paul and Erlend were with Harald's son Olaf Kyrre, guarding the ships at Riccall, when the battle of Stamford Bridge was fought. The Norwegian army was heavily defeated, and both Harald and Tostig were killed, but Olaf and the earls were allowed to leave with the survivors by King Harold Godwinson after giving pledges not to attack England again. The losses suffered were so severe that according to the Anglo-Saxon Chronicle only 24 ships from the Norse fleet of over 300 were needed to carry the survivors away. They withdrew to Orkney, where they spent the winter, and in the spring Olaf returned to Norway still on good terms with the Thorfinssons.

== Family strife ==
The Orkneyinga saga says that Paul and Erlend (Erland) remained on friendly terms until their children grew to adulthood, after which the disputes between their sons led to a quarrel and open hostility between the brothers. As the disputes between the descendants of Paul and Erlend loomed large in the affairs of 12th-century Orkney, the saga went into some detail about their family relationships.

Paul was married to an unnamed daughter of Norwegian earl Hakon Ivarsson and they had two sons and four daughters. Of these, Hakon Paulsson played the greatest part in later Orcadian events. Their other children were Thora, Brynjolf, Ingirid, Herbjorg, and Ragnhild.

Erlend married Thora, daughter of Sumarlidi Ospaksson. They had two sons and two daughters, while Erlend had a third, illegitimate daughter as well. Erland's daughter Gunnhild was married to Kol Kalison, and Earl Rognvald Kali Kolsson was their son. The second daughter was called Cecilia, and the natural daughter was Jaddvor. Erlend's sons were Erling and Magnus, who later appear in the saga as earl, martyr, and saint. Magnus was "a quiet sort of man" but the troubles between the earls began with rivalry between Hakon Paulsson and Erling Erlendsson. Both are described as talented but also quarrelsome and arrogant.

Hakon believed himself to be the most highly born of the cousins and wanted to be seen as the foremost amongst his kin, but Erling was not one to back down. The fathers did their best to reach a settlement, but it became clear that they were both favouring their own offspring, which resulted in hostility between them. Eventually the earldom was divided into two distinct territories, as it had been in the time of their father Thorfinn and uncle Brusi Sigurdsson.

== Religion ==
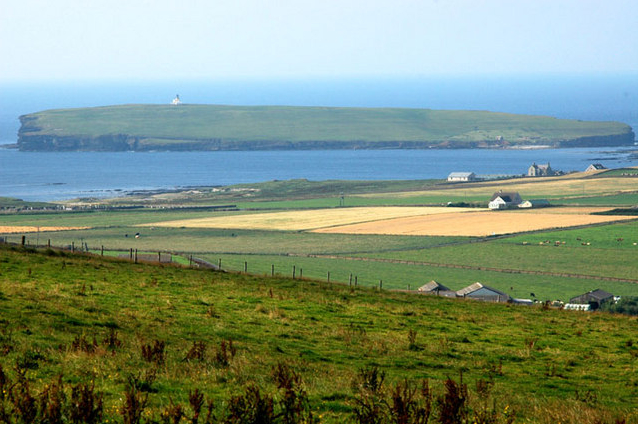
Birsay Parish with the Brough of Birsay in the background

Paul and Erlend's father, Thorfinn, may have visited the Pontiff in Rome and c. 1050 Thorulf, the first Bishop of Orkney was installed at the "Christ Church" in the "city of Blascona". Thorfinn and Thorulf's Christ Church has been identified with the Romanesque ruins on the tidal island known as Brough of Birsay, but there is also evidence that it was located over in the Mainland next to the Earl's palace. This remained as the bishop's seat until it was moved to Kirkwall during the time of William the Old after the death of Magnus Erlendsson.

== Erlend and Paul deposed ==
Haakon Paulsson went on a long journey to Scandinavia, later staying with his kinsman, Magnus Barefoot the king of Norway. Whilst there he heard that his father Paul had largely handed over control of Orkney to Earl Erlend and his sons and that after a substantial period of peace the people of Orkney were not keen to see Haakon returning. He therefore asked Magnus for help in the hope of obtaining the earldom for himself. Haakon knew Magnus was power-hungry and suggested that he take back direct control of Orkney as a base for raiding further afield, as his predecessor Harold Fairhair had done. Magnus was persuaded, and in 1098 he launched a major campaign, taking his 8-year-old son Sigurd with him. However, Magnus had designs that were not envisaged by Haakon. He took possession of the islands, deposing both Erlend and Paul who were sent away to Norway as prisoners. Magnus and Erling Erlendsson were taken by Magnus as hostages, and Sigurd was installed as the nominal earl. Sigurd's rule was aided by a council, with Haakon as a member of this group. (On ascending to the Norwegian throne Sigurd made Haakon Earl of Orkney c. 1104).

In the winter of 1098, Erlend died and was buried in Trondheim. Paul Thorfinnsson also died that year and was buried in Bergen. Erling Erlendsson died while campaigning with Magnus, either at the Battle of the Menai Straits or in Ulster.

== Interpretations ==
The saga references to Paul and Erland are relatively brief, suggesting that, although there may have been ongoing warfare in the territories annexed by their father Thorfinn, in Orkney at least life was mostly peaceful during their more than thirty-year rule. Thomson (2008) identifies the joint rulership of earls as the key recurring theme of the Orkneyinga Saga in the period up to 1214. The initial friendship between Paul and Erlend Thorfinnsson notwithstanding, this was a situation that was "inherently unstable and usually ended in violence". These family feuds culminate in the martyrdom of Magnus Erlendsson c.1115, and Thompson believes that the Icelandic writer is emphasising the doom of "kin-slaying". Indeed, the rivalry between the two families that Paul and Erland founded were still alive four generations later when the Orkneyinga Saga was written down.

== In literature ==
The overthrow of Erland and Paul is a central plot point of Stephen Lawhead's novel The Iron Lance (HarperCollins; 1999)

Preceded by Thorfinn Sigurdsson	Joint Earls of Orkney c.1065–1098	Succeeded by Sigurd Magnusson
