= Hardrada dynasty =

Norse royal house (11th-12th centuries)

Hardrada dynasty Hardrådeætta
- Parent house: Fairhair
- Country: Kingdom of Norway; Kingdom of the Isles; Earldom of Orkney; Kingdom of Dublin
- Founded: 1046
- Founder: Harald Hardrada
- Current head: extinct, last monarch of this dynasty was Magnus Erlingsson
- Titles: King of Norway; King of the Isles; King of Dublin; Earl of Orkney
- Cadet branches: Gille (illegitimate; dubious)

The Hardrada dynasty (Norwegian: Hardrådeætta) was a powerful royal dynasty which ruled, at various times in history, the Kingdom of Norway, the Kingdom of Mann and the Isles, and the Earldom of Orkney.

The royal house was founded, albeit unknowingly, by Harald Sigurdsson when he was made king of Norway. His descendants would expand the influence, wealth and power of the dynasty after his death at Stamford Bridge September 25, 1066. It is very unlikely that the rulers ever referred to their dynasty as the "House of Hardrada", this is a term coined for the dynasty by modern historians. The younger saga writers (not the kings themselves) claimed that Harald Hardrada descended from Norway's first king Harald Fairhair, but this is not accepted as historically correct by most modern historians.

It replaced the Saint Olaf dynasty, and was again replaced by the Gille branch, whose founder Harald Gille claimed to be a descendant of the Hardrada line. Sometimes this line is considered a part of the House of Hardrada. The line was briefly restored under Magnus Erlingsson, a cognatic descendant of the dynasty, but was replaced again by the House of Sverre in 1184.

== List of kings and rival kings ==
The rulers within the royal house or dynasty would often have a "rival king" to oppose the "legitimate" king's right to rule the realm and dominions (rival kings noted in bold). Here is a list of the rulers when the house held the power in Norway:

- Harald Hardrule Harald Hardråde: 1046–1066
- Magnus Haraldsson Magnus II of Norway: 1066–1069
- Olaf the Peaceful Olav Kyrre or Olaf III of Norway: 1066–1093
- Håkon Magnusson: 1093–1094
- Magnus Barefoot Magnus Berrføtt or Magnus III of Norway: 1093–1103
- Olaf Magnusson: 1103–1115
- Øystein Magnusson Eystein I of Norway: 1103–1123
- Sigurd the Crusader Sigurd Jorsalfare or Sigurd I of Norway: 1103–1130
- Magnus the Blind Magnus Blinde or Magnus IV of Norway: 1130–1135
  - Sigurd the Noisy Sigurd Slembe: 1135–1139, **rival king**
- Magnus Erlingsson Magnus V of Norway: 1161–1184
  - Olav Ugjæva Olav Gudbrandsson: 1166–1169, **rival king**
  - Sigurd Magnusson: 1193–1194, **rival king**
  - Inge Magnusson: 1196–1202, **rival king**
  - Erling Stonewall Erling Steinvegg: 1204–1207, **rival king**
