= Magnus Barefoot =

King of Norway from 1093 to 1103

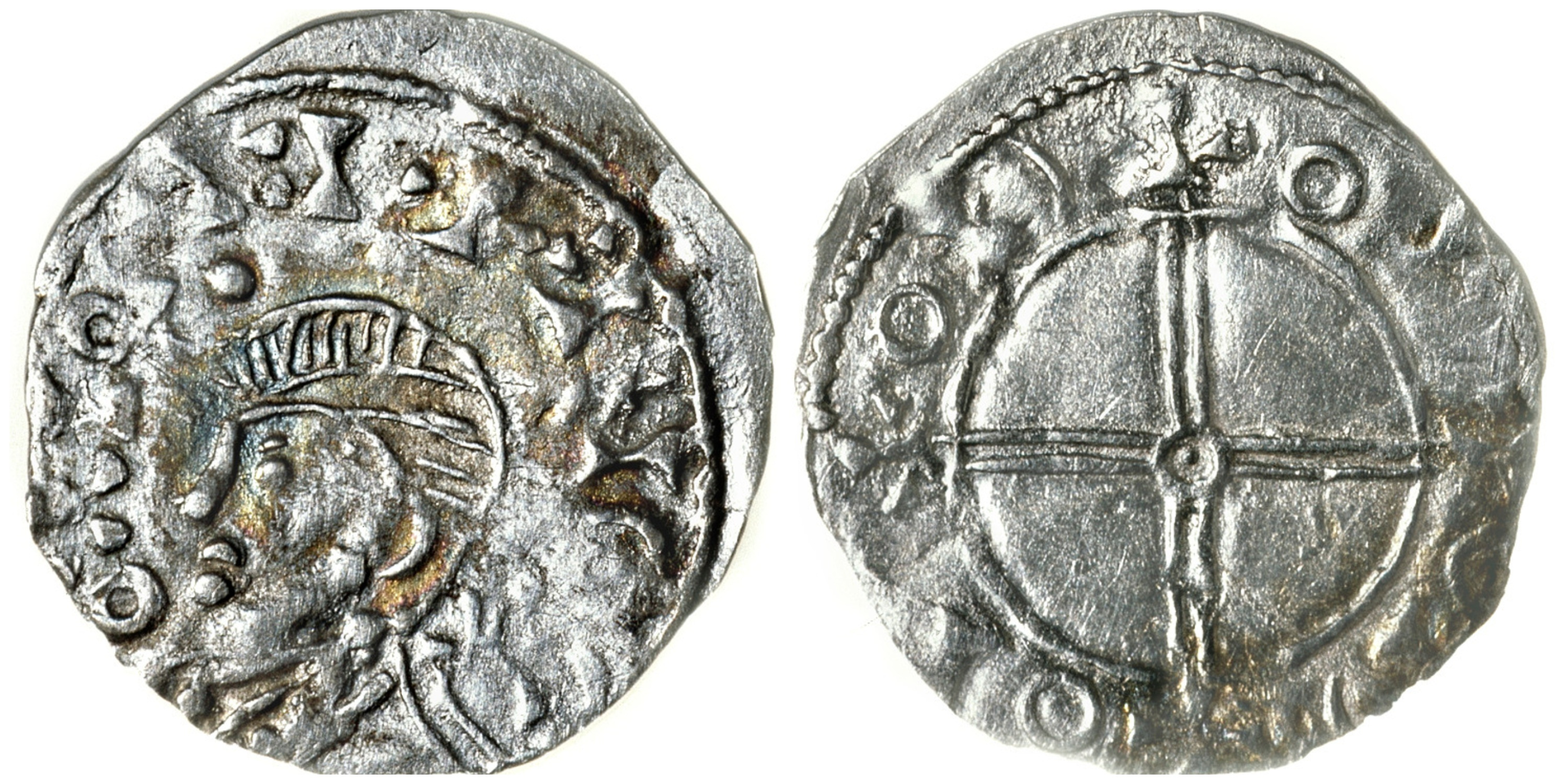
- Silver penning struck sometime during the reign of Magnus

King of Norway
- Reign: September 1093 – 24 August 1103
- Predecessor: Olaf III
- Successor: Sigurd Magnusson, Eystein Magnusson and Olaf Magnusson
- Co-ruler: Haakon Magnusson (until 1095)

King of Dublin
- Reign: 1102–1103
- Predecessor: Domnall Gerrlámhach
- Successor: Domnall Gerrlámhach
- Born: 1073; Norway
- Died: 24 August 1103 (aged 29–30) near River Quoile, Downpatrick, Ulster, Ireland
- Burial: near St. Patrick's Church, Downpatrick
- Spouse: Margaret Fredkulla
- Illegitimate children more...: Eystein Magnusson; Sigurd the Crusader; Olaf Magnusson; Tora Magnusdatter
Names
- Magnús Óláfsson
- House: Hardrada
- Father: Olaf III of Norway
- Mother: Tora?; disputed

Magnus III Olafsson (Old Norse: Magnús Óláfsson, Norwegian: Magnus Olavsson; 1073 – 24 August 1103), better known as Magnus Barefoot (Old Norse: Magnús berfœttr, Norwegian: Magnus Berrføtt), was the King of Norway from 1093 until his death in 1103. His reign was marked by aggressive military campaigns and conquest, particularly in the Norse-dominated parts of Ireland and Britain, where he extended his rule to the Kingdom of the Isles and Dublin.

As the only son of King Olaf Kyrre, Magnus was proclaimed king in southeastern Norway shortly after his father's death in 1093. In the north his claim was contested by his cousin, Haakon Magnusson (son of King Magnus Haraldsson), and the two co-ruled uneasily until Haakon's death in 1095. Disgruntled members of the nobility refused to recognise Magnus after his cousin's death, but the insurrection was short-lived. After securing his position domestically, Magnus campaigned around the Irish Sea from 1098 to 1099. He raided through Orkney, the Hebrides and Mann (the Northern and Southern Isles), and ensured Norwegian control by a treaty with the Scottish king. Based on Mann during his time in the west, Magnus had a number of forts and houses built on the island and probably also obtained suzerainty of Galloway. He sailed to Wales later in his expedition, gaining the support of Anglesey (and the Gwynedd) after aiding against the invading Norman forces from the island.

Following his return to Norway, Magnus led campaigns into Dalsland and Västergötland in Sweden, claiming an ancient border with the country. After two unsuccessful invasions and a number of skirmishes Danish king Eric Evergood initiated peace talks among the three Scandinavian monarchs, fearing that the conflict would get out of hand. Magnus concluded peace with the Swedes in 1101 by agreeing to marry Margaret, daughter of the Swedish king Inge Stenkilsson. In return, Magnus gained Dalsland as part of her dowry. He set out on his final western campaign in 1102, and may have sought to conquer Ireland. Magnus entered into an alliance with Irish king Muirchertach Ua Briain of Munster, who recognised Magnus's control of Dublin. Under unclear circumstances, while obtaining food supplies for his return to Norway, Magnus was killed in an ambush by the Ulaid the next year; territorial advances characterising his reign ended with his death.

Into modern times, his legacy has remained more pronounced in Ireland and Scotland than in his native Norway. Among the few domestic developments known during his reign, Norway developed a more centralised rule and moved closer to the European model of church organisation. Popularly portrayed as a Viking warrior rather than a medieval monarch, Magnus was the last Norwegian king to fall in battle abroad, and he may in some respects be considered the final Viking king.

== Background ==
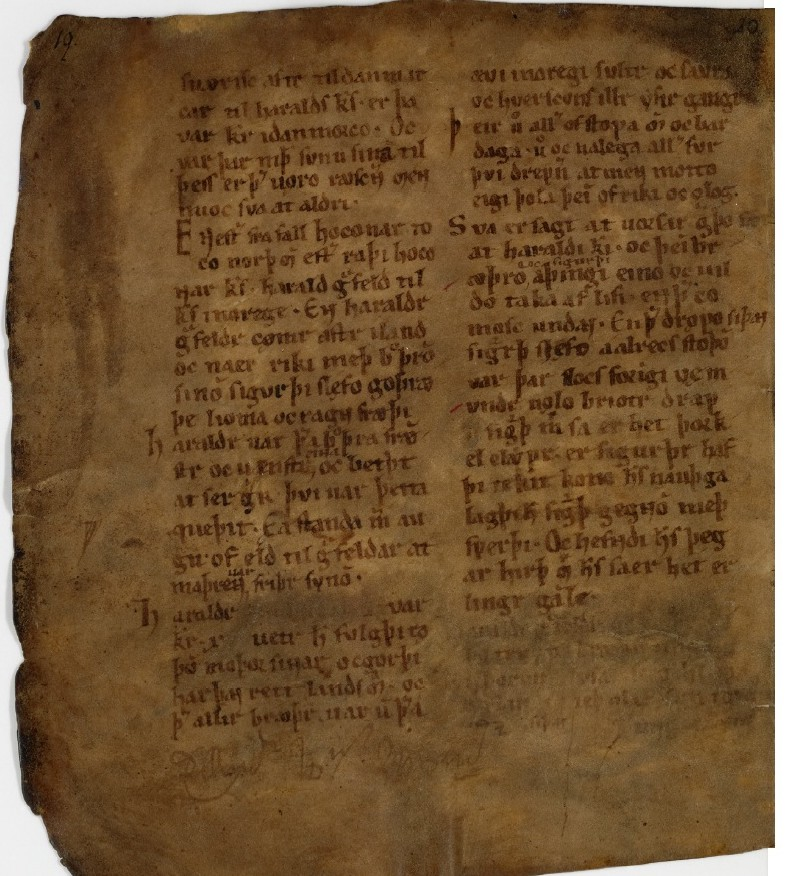
Page of 13th-century copy of the Norwegian chronicle Ágrip, a source for Magnus Barefoot's life

Most information about Magnus is gleaned from Norse sagas and chronicles, which began appearing during the 12th century. The most important sources still available are the Norwegian chronicles Historia de Antiquitate Regum Norwagiensium by Theodoric the Monk and the anonymous Ágrip af Nóregskonungasögum (or simply Ágrip) from the 1180s and the Icelandic sagas Heimskringla (by Snorri Sturluson), Morkinskinna and Fagrskinna, which date to about the 1220s. While the later sagas are the most detailed accounts, they are also generally considered the least reliable. Additional information about Magnus, in particular his campaigns, is found in sources from the British Isles, which included contemporary accounts.

Magnus was born around the end of 1073 as the only son of King Olaf Kyrre. His mother's identity is uncertain; she is identified as Tora Arnesdatter (daughter of otherwise-unknown Arne Låge) in Morkinskinna and Fagrskinna, as Tora Joansdatter in Heimskringla, Hrokkinskinna and Hryggjarstykki and an unnamed daughter of "Ragnvald jarl" from Godøy, Sunnmøre in the genealogical text Af en gl. ætleg (commonly known as Sunnmørsættleggen). The historical consensus (including P. A. Munch and Claus Krag) has favoured Tora Arnesdatter, but the other claims have also gained support. Anders Stølen has argued that she was a daughter of Ragnvald jarl (who has been identified as Rognvald Brusason, Earl of Orkney by Ola Kvalsund), while historian Randi Helene Førsund has considered Tora Joansdatter more likely.

Magnus grew up among the hird (royal retinue) of his father in Nidaros (modern Trondheim), de facto capital of Norway at the time. His father's cousin, the chieftain Tore Ingeridsson, was foster-father to Magnus. In his youth, he was apparently more similar to his warlike grandfather, King Harald Hardrada, than to his father (who bore the byname Kyrre: "the Peaceful"). According to Snorri Sturluson, Magnus was considered handsome and gifted in learning; although he was shorter in stature than his grandfather Harald, he was reportedly known as "Magnus the Tall". Magnus's more-common byname, "Barefoot" or "Barelegs", was—according to Snorri—due to his adopting the Gaelic dress of the Irish and Scots: a short tunic, which left the lower legs bare. Another version (by Danish historian Saxo Grammaticus) maintains that he acquired the nickname because he was forced to flee from a Swedish attack in his bare feet, while a third explains that he rode barefoot (like the Irish). Due to Magnus's aggressive nature and his campaigns abroad, he also had the nickname styrjaldar-Magnús ("Warrior Magnus" or "Magnus the Strife-lover").

== Reign ==
=== Establishing authority ===
Norway had experienced a long period of peace during the reign of Magnus's father, Olaf. Magnus may have been present when Olaf died in Rånrike, Båhuslen (southeastern Norway) in September 1093 and was probably proclaimed king at the Borgarting, the thing (assembly) of the adjacent region of Viken later that month. When Magnus became king, he already had a network of support among the Norwegian aristocracy. Although sources are unclear about the first year of his reign, it is apparent that Magnus's focus was on the west (towards the British Isles). Since conditions were chaotic in Norse-dominated parts of the British Isles since the death of Thorfinn the Mighty, this provided Magnus an opportunity to intervene in local power struggles. According to some accounts, he made his first expedition west in 1093–94 (or 1091–92), helping Scottish king Donald Bane to conquer Edinburgh and the Scottish throne and possibly gaining control of the Southern Isles (Suðreyjar) in return. It is unclear if this early expedition took place, since it is not directly referenced in early reliable sources or the sagas.

Magnus was opposed by his cousin Haakon Magnusson, son of King Olaf's brother and short-lived co-ruler King Magnus Haraldsson, who claimed half the kingdom. Haakon was proclaimed king in the Uplands and at the Øyrating, the thing of Trøndelag (in central Norway). According to Førsund, Haakon took control of the entire portion of the kingdom once held by his father (also including the Frostating—the thing of Hålogaland in northern Norway—and the Gulating—the thing of western Norway). Haakon secured support by relieving farmers of taxes and duties (including taxes dating back to the Danish rule of Sweyn Knutsson during the early 1030s), while Magnus pursued costly policies and demanded lengthy military service. After Magnus settled at the new royal estate in Nidaros for the winter of 1094–95, Haakon also travelled to the city and took up residence at the old royal estate. Their relationship became increasingly tense, culminating when Haakon saw Magnus's longships fully rigged at sea. Haakon summoned the Øyrating in response, leading Magnus to sail southwards. Haakon attempted to intercept Magnus by travelling south to Viken by land (over the mountains of Dovrefjell), but he died unexpectedly while hunting in February 1095.

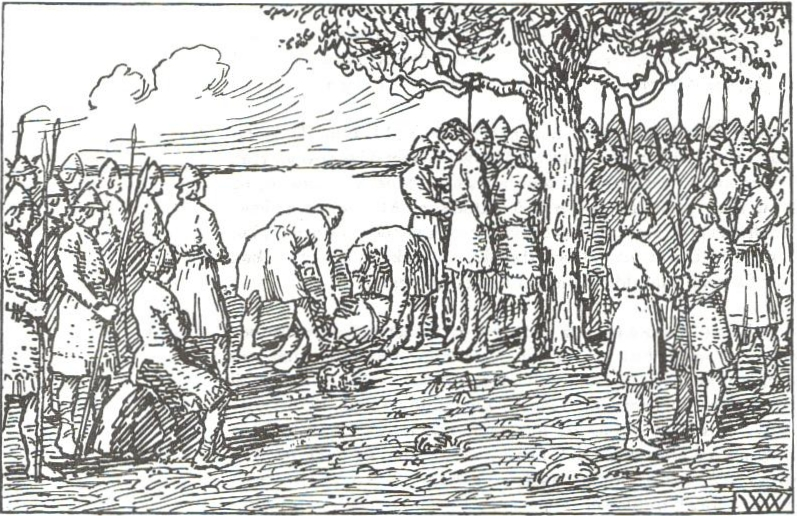
The hanging of Egil Aslaksson, as imagined by Wilhelm Wetlesen (1899)

The strongman behind Haakon's monarchy had been his foster-father Tore Tordsson ("Steigar-Tore"), who refused to recognise Magnus as king after Haakon's death. With Egil Aslaksson and other noblemen, he had the otherwise-unknown Sweyn Haraldsson set up as a pretender. Although later sagas maintain that Sweyn was Danish, some modern historians have speculated that he may have been a son of Harald Hardrada. The revolt was based in the Uplands, but also gained support from noblemen elsewhere in the country. After several weeks of fighting, Magnus captured Tore and his supporters and had them hanged on the island of Vambarholm (outside Hamnøy, Lofoten, in northern Norway). Magnus was reportedly furious because he could not pardon Egil, a potentially useful, young and resourceful nobleman. As king, his honour would only allow a pardon if other noblemen pleaded for Egil's life; this did not happen.

Magnus's final domestic dispute was with the noble Sveinke Steinarsson, who refused to recognise him as king. Although Sveinke reduced piracy in Viken, he was forced into exile for three years after negotiating with Magnus's men. Since piracy increased soon after Sveinke's departure (possibly encouraged by Sveinke himself), Magnus met him in the Danish province of Halland to request his return to Norway. They reconciled; Sveinke became a loyal supporter of Magnus, now the undisputed king of Norway.

=== Other developments ===
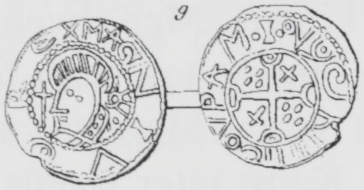
Coin of Magnus Barefoot, styled "MAGNIVO REX". Profile with a mace on the obverse; reverse a crutch cross, with a cross (or four points) in each of the two facing corners

Since the Norse sources (including the skaldic verses which were the sagas' main sources) chiefly describe war-related matters, less is known about other events during the reigns of the early Norwegian kings. Snorri, for instance, wrote fifteen pages about Magnus and only two pages about Magnus's peaceful father Olaf Kyrre (despite Olaf's reign lasting almost three times longer than Magnus's). Modern historians have noted that this probably has made the image of kings like Magnus Barefoot one-sided (in Magnus's case, skewed towards his deeds as a warrior).

Magnus's rule was generally marked by Norway's increasing similarity to other European kingdoms. Royal rule became established, and he consolidated power through a network of powerful noblemen (some of whom were relatives); church organisation also developed. The Nordic bishops belonged to the Archdiocese of Hamburg-Bremen until a year after Magnus's death (when the Archdiocese of Lund was formed); priests and bishops were largely foreigners from England and Germany. In reality, however, Magnus ruled the church in Norway.

Through numismatics, it is known that minting reform began during Magnus's reign. The reform restored silver content in coins to around 90 percent, the level at Harald Hardrada's 1055 reform (Haraldsslåtten) which reduced silver content to about 30 percent (the remainder of the coin was copper). Coin size in Magnus's reform was reduced to .45 gram, half the previous weight. Although the silver value of a coin remained about the same, copper was not needed in coins.

=== First Irish Sea campaign ===
Magnus sought to re-establish Norwegian influence around the Irish Sea. He attempted to install vassal king Ingemund in the Southern Isles in 1097, but the latter was killed in a revolt. It is unclear what Magnus's ultimate ambitions were, and the significance of his campaign has been downplayed by modern English historians. English chronicler William of Malmesbury believed that Magnus sought to capture the throne from William II of England (in common with the ambitions of his grandfather, Harald Hardrada). Historians have speculated that he wanted to establish an empire which included Scotland and Ireland, although most modern Norwegian and Scottish historians believe his chief aim was simply to control the Norse communities around the Irish Sea. While he may have been influenced by Ingemund's murder, the Orkneyinga saga claims that Magnus was persuaded by a son of an Orkney earl, Haakon Paulsson, who wanted an earldom for himself. It is also possible that Magnus wished to provide a realm outside Norway for his eight-year-old son Sigurd, who accompanied him. Magnus sailed into the Western Sea in 1098, arriving in Orkney with a large fleet. The Chronicles of the Kings of Mann and the Isles claim that he had 160 ships, but English chronicler Orderic Vitalis states that his fleet consisted of 60 ships. Based on this, P. A. Munch suggests an initial fleet of 160 ships, of which 100 were from the leidang (public levy) and returned shortly after arrival; the fleet accompanying Magnus southward in the campaigns consisted of 60 royal and baronial ships. According to Førsund, the low estimate of 120 men per ship means 8,000 men in the royal and baronial ships and 12,000 from the leidang ships. However, many historians believe that ship numbers in old naval campaign accounts are exaggerated.

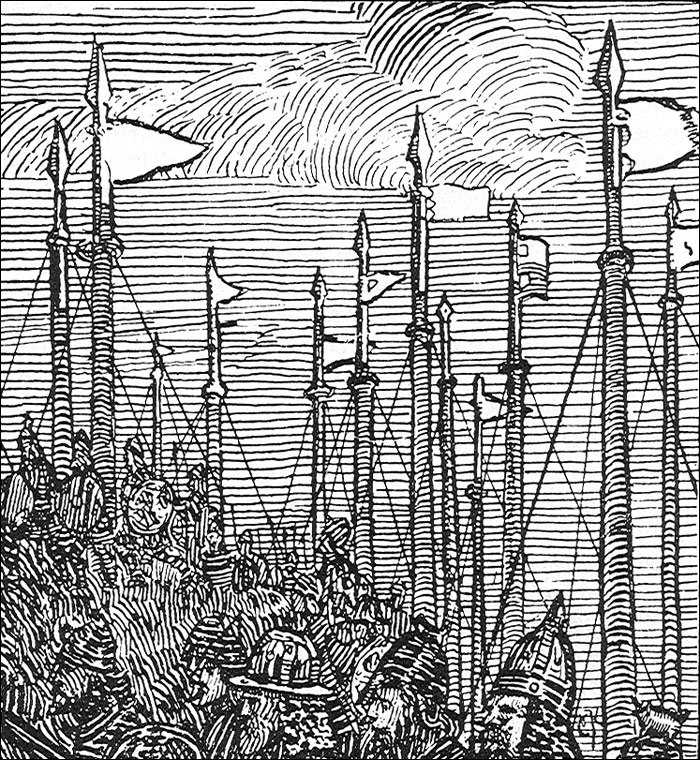
Magnus Barefoot's army in Ireland, as imagined in Gustav Storm's 1899 edition of Heimskringla

After his arrival, Magnus began negotiations with Scottish and Irish kings about the hird and control of land in Scotland, Ireland and the surrounding islands. Upon arriving in Orkney, he sent the earls Paul and Erlend Thorfinnsson away to Norway as prisoners on a leidang ship, took their sons Haakon Paulsson, Magnus Erlendsson and Erling Erlendsson as hostages and installed his own son Sigurd as earl. Magnus then raided Scotland, the Southern Isles and Lewis. Meeting no significant opposition, he continued pillaging the Hebridean islands of Uist, Skye, Tiree, Mull and Islay, and the peninsula of Kintyre; Iona was visited, but not pillaged. Magnus is also recorded as warring in Sanday, although the exact location is unclear (there are three islands with that name in the region). On entering the Irish Sea, he lost three leidang ships and 120 men in Ulster. Magnus then continued to Mann, where the earl Óttar fell in a violent battle; he also chased (or captured) Lagman Godredsson, King of the Isles. Mann came under Norwegian control, and Magnus and his men stayed on the island for a time. During his time there, he organised Norwegian immigration to the island and had several forts and houses built (or rebuilt) using timber from Galloway on the Scottish mainland. This implied he had subdued part of that region too, reducing its chieftains to tributaries.

Magnus may have intended to invade Ireland next, only to find he had overextended himself. He may have been approached by Gruffudd ap Cynan, King of Gwynedd, who had been driven to Ireland by the Norman earls Hugh of Montgomery and Hugh d'Avranches. With six ships (according to Orderic Vitalis), Magnus steered towards Anglesey in Gwynedd, Wales. Appearing off the coast at Puffin Island, he interrupted a Norman victory celebration after their defeat of the Gwynedd king—for the Welsh, "so opportunely it was ascribed to divine providence" according to historian Rosemary Power (although Magnus had not necessarily intended to side with them). In the ensuing battle (known as the Battle of Anglesey Sound, according to Power "the most widely reported event in the history of Magnus"), Magnus shot Hugh of Montgomery dead with an arrow through his eye and defeated the Norman forces. The sources indicate that Magnus regretted killing Montgomery, suggesting that he may have been interested in an alliance with the Normans. He abruptly returned to Mann with his men, leaving the Norman army weak and demoralized. After this battle, Anglesey was considered the southern border of Norway. Gruffudd ap Cynan soon returned to the island, awarding Magnus gifts and honour (which may indicate that Gwynedd had capitulated). The extension of Magnus's kingdom probably began to concern the English, who remembered the invasion of Magnus's grandfather Harald Hardrada in 1066, war with Danish king Sweyn II Estridson in 1069–70 and the threat of invasion by Cnut IV in 1085.

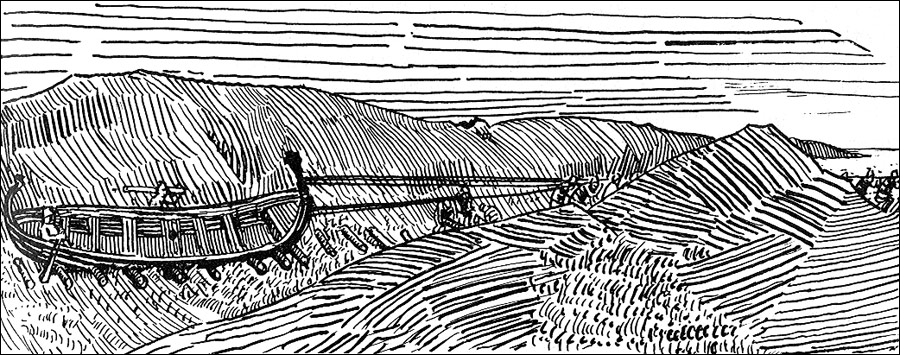
Magnus demonstrating that Kintyre was part of the Scottish agreement, as imagined in Gustav Storm's 1899 edition of Heimskringla

In Scotland internal fighting continued between rival kings, although King Edgar had gained a slight advantage. Perhaps fearing to meet Magnus in battle after the internecine strife, according to the sagas Edgar—mistakenly called Malcolm—told Magnus he would renounce all Scottish claims to islands west of Scotland in exchange for peace. Magnus accepted the offer, which reportedly gave him every island a ship could reach with its rudder set. He gained recognition of his rule in the Southern Isles, including Kintyre after demonstrating that it should be included by sitting at the rudder of his ship as it was dragged across the narrow isthmus at Tarbert. Historian Richard Oram has claimed that references to a formal agreement with the Scottish king is a "post-Norwegian civil war confection" designed to legitimise the agenda of Haakon IV Haakonsson. Rosemary Power agrees with the Norse sources that a formal agreement with the Scots was probably concluded, and Seán Duffy notes that Edgar "happily ceded" the isles to Magnus since he had "little or no authority there in any case". Magnus spent the winter in the Hebrides (continuing to fortify the islands), while many of his men returned to Norway. There may have been talks at this time of Magnus marrying Matilda, daughter of late Scottish king Malcolm III Canmore, but no marriage took place. Magnus returned to Norway a year later during the summer of 1099, although many of the islands he had conquered (such as Anglesey) were only nominally under Norwegian control.

=== Campaign in Sweden ===
After returning to Norway, Magnus turned east. By claiming an ancient border between Norway and Sweden, he set his course for the Swedish provinces of Dalsland and Västergötland in late 1099. In Magnus's view, the border with Sweden should be set further east: at the Göta älv river, through the Vänern lake and north to the province of Värmland. He claimed all land west of Vänern (chiefly Dalsland). Swedish king Inge Stenkilsson refuted the claim, and Magnus began a campaign in response. He raided his way through the forest villages, and Inge began amassing an army. When advised by his men to retreat, Magnus became more aggressive; he believed that once begun, a campaign should never be aborted. In a surprise nighttime attack, Magnus assaulted Swedish forces east of Göta älv at Fuxerna (near Lilla Edet). After defeating the Swedes at Fuxerna, he conquered part of Västergötland. According to a skald, Magnus conquered "fifteen hundreds from the Geats". He had a wooden fort, surrounded by a moat, built on the island of Kållandsö in the southern portion of Vänern. Before returning to Norway, Magnus left 300 men on the island for the winter (led by Finn Skofteson and Sigurd Ullstreng).

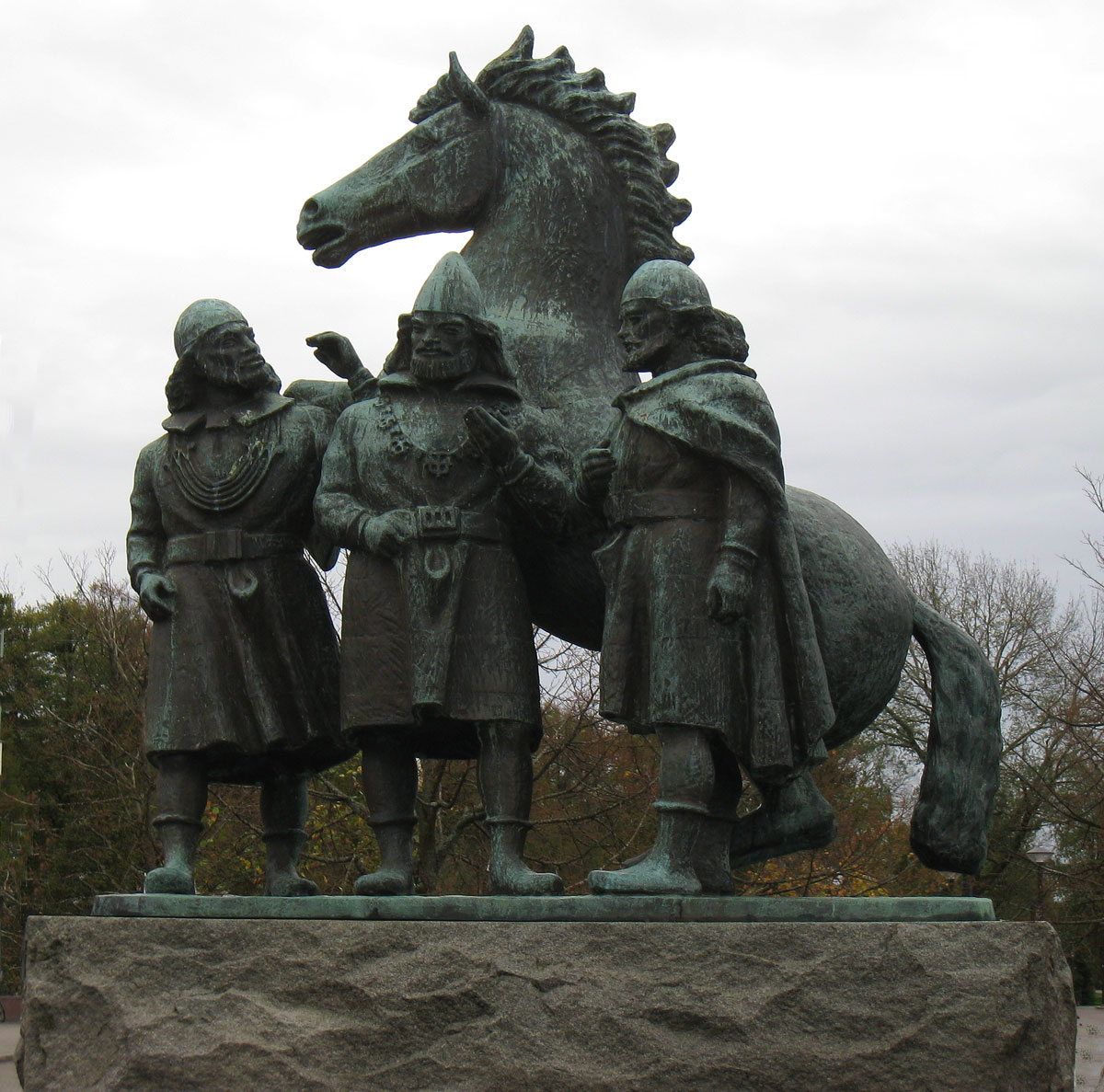
Three kings, modern statue in Kungälv by Arvid Källström

According to Randi Helene Førsund, the Norwegians in Kållandsö appear to have been characterized by arrogance (perhaps due to their successes under Magnus) and taunted the Swedish king for taking so long to arrive. After newly formed ice connected the island to the mainland, Inge arrived with about 3,000 men. Although he offered several times to allow the Norwegians to return home in peace (with their plunder and possessions), Inge's offers were rejected. The Swedes finally attacked, burning the fort. The Norwegians were spared and allowed to return home, after being beaten with sticks and surrendering all their possessions. Angry at the humiliating defeat, Magnus planned revenge. He entered Sweden the following year, reconquering the same areas. During the hasty campaign Magnus and his men were ambushed by Swedish forces and forced to flee back to their ships, suffering heavy losses. The war continued until 1100 or 1101.

Danish king Eric Evergood, concerned that the conflict would escalate, began peace talks between the two kings. Relations had been strained between Denmark and Norway after Magnus's 1096 raids into Halland, and Eric feared that the conflict might spill over into his own country. The three Scandinavian kings eventually agreed to negotiate peace in the border area near Göta älv. After a constructive meeting, they agreed to preserve ancestral borders; by marrying Inge's daughter Margaret (who acquired the byname Fredkulla: "Maiden of Peace"), Magnus acquired the lands he claimed on behalf of his ancestors. Since the marriage was childless, Dalsland never became established as a Norwegian province and was returned to Sweden after his death.

=== Second Irish Sea campaign and death ===
Magnus again set his course for Ireland in 1101 or 1102, this time probably with a greater army than he had in his previous campaign. One of his biggest challenges was the number of petty kings and alliances on the island. Irish sources maintain that Magnus came to "take Ireland", "invade Ireland" or "besiege Ireland". He received reinforcements from Orkney on his way to Mann, where he set up a base to survey conditions. Tensions ran high between Magnus and the king of Munster and High King of Ireland, Muirchertach Ua Briain (Mýrjartak), who was struggling with his rival Domnall Ua Lochlainn. Magnus may have tested the situation in 1101, when unnamed sailors are said to have raided Scattery Island (near Muirchertach's base). After his arrival at Mann, Irish sources describe Magnus as agreeing to "a year's peace" with the Irish (suggesting enmity; such agreements were diplomatic devices, usually negotiated between two sides in war). The marriage agreement described in other sources was part of the treaty; Magnus's son, Sigurd, married Muirchertach's daughter Bjaðmunjo. On their wedding day, Magnus named Sigurd his co-king and put him in charge of the western lands. Muirchertach also recognised Magnus's control over Dublin and Fingal.

Around the same time Muirchertach married a daughter of Arnulf of Montgomery, brother of Hugh (who was killed by Magnus in 1098). The account in Morkinskinna concerning a "foreign knight" named "Giffarðr", who appeared at the court of Magnus before his Swedish campaign, is suggested by Rosemary Power as evidence that Magnus may have conspired with the Norman Walter Giffard, Earl of Buckingham (or a family member) in the revolt against Henry I of England. According to Orderic Vitalis, Magnus left treasure with a wealthy citizen in Lincoln which was confiscated by King Henry after Magnus's death. This treasure could have been paid by Norman earls for Magnus's support, and possibly arranged by the Giffarðr who is said to have visited Magnus's court in the sagas. This could have provided Magnus with a lucrative return for his costly western campaigns, which were unpopular in Norway at the time.

Muirchertach was skilled in diplomacy, and negotiation with the dowries of his daughters may have been part of a political game. While he may not have intended to honour his agreements with Magnus (or others), he needed the latter's assistance to crush Domnall. Magnus and Muirchertach went on joint raiding expeditions after the peace agreement, only interrupted by the winter of 1102–03. The sagas claim that Magnus wintered in Connacht, but since Connacht is incorrectly claimed to be Muirchertach's kingdom the location was corrected to Kincora, Munster by modern historians. Rosemary Power considered it more likely that Magnus would have kept his fleet near Dublin. Magnus was probably allied with Muirchertach during his campaigns against Domnall and the Cenél nEógain in 1103, but (in contrast to the Norse sources) Irish sources (the Annals of Ulster and Annals of the Four Masters) do not describe their campaigns as successful. On 5 August 1103, Muirchertach unsuccessfully tried to subdue Domnall in the Battle of Mag Coba. Magnus did not take part, but his Dublin subjects fought with Muirchertach. Since Magnus was closing in on the Irish throne, Muirchertach may have wanted him out of the way. According to Morkinskinna and Heimskringla, the two agreed that Muirchertach was to bring Magnus and his men cattle provisions for their return to Norway; as this dragged on past the agreed time, Magnus became suspicious that the Irish planned an attack. He gathered his men on St. Bartholomew's Day (or the day before, according to Ágrip), 24 August 1103, and ventured into the country. It is possible that Magnus and his men made an incautious landing to raid cattle, or the Ulaid mistook the Norwegians for cattle-raiding Hebrideans. Alternatively, Muirchertach may have ordered the Ulaid to bring provisions to Magnus, inciting the Ulaid to ambush the Norwegians.

"King Magnus had a helmet on his head; a red shield, in which was inlaid a gilded lion; and was girt with the sword of Legbit, of which the hilt was of tooth (ivory), and handgrip wound about with gold thread; and the sword was extremely sharp. In his hand he had a short spear, and a red silk short cloak, over his coat, on which, both before and behind, was embroidered a lion in yellow silk; and all men acknowledged that they never had seen a brisker, statelier man."

— Magnus before the battle (according to Snorri Sturluson)

Norse sources describe a large force emerging from hiding places in an ambush. The Norwegian forces were taken by surprise, and were not in battle order. Magnus attempted to assert control over his disordered army, ordering part of his force to seize secure ground and use archery fire to slow the Irish. In the melee Magnus was pierced by a spear through both thighs above the knees but he fought on, attempting to get his men back to the level campsite. An axe-wielding Irishman charged him, striking a lethal blow to his neck. When his men said that he proceeded incautiously in his campaigns, Magnus is reported to have responded "Kings are made for honour, not for long life"; he was the last Norwegian king to fall in battle abroad.

Perhaps betrayed by Muirchertach, Magnus may also have been betrayed by his own men (in particular the contingent of nobleman Torgrim Skinnluve from the Uplands, who fled to the ships during the battle). It is possible that Torgrim and his men may have been directed by powerful men in Norway, who wanted Magnus removed from the Norwegian throne. More Irishmen than Norwegians fell in the battle, according to Snorri Sturluson, and Magnus's reign could have been different if Torgrim and his men had fought as directed. Magnus's son Sigurd returned to Norway without his child bride after his father's defeat, and direct Norwegian control in the region came to an end. Although Norwegian influence remained, no Norwegian king returned for more than 150 years.

== Descendants ==
Magnus married Margaret Fredkulla, daughter of Swedish king Inge Stenkilsson, as part of the peace agreement of 1101. Their marriage did not produce any children. His three sons (who succeeded him as king) were born to different women, and he had two known daughters by unidentified women:

- Eystein: Born 1089 to a mother "of low birth".
- Sigurd: Born 1090; his mother's name was Tora.
- Olaf: Born c. 1099; his mother was Sigrid Saxesdatter from Vik in Strinda, Trøndelag.
- Ragnild: Married Harald Kesja, Danish pretender and son of Danish king Eric Evergood.
- Tora: Married Icelandic chieftain Loftur Sæmundsson.

Years after Magnus's death, other men came forward claiming to be his sons; however, it is impossible to ascertain the veracity of these claims:

- Harald Gille: Born 1103 in Ireland, his claim was recognised by Magnus's son Sigurd.
- Sigurd Slembe: His mother was Tora Saxesdatter from Vik; his claim was not recognised (by Harald Gille).
- Magnus Raude: Mentioned only in Fagrskinna.

== Aftermath ==
=== Burial ===
Magnus probably died in the vicinity of the River Quoile. According to the Chronicles of the Kings of Mann and the Isles, Magnus was "buried near the Church of St Patrick, in Down". About two miles (1.2 km) south of the cathedral on Horse Island is a mound which became known as Magnus's Grave after its identification on an 1859 map attributed to Danish archaeologist Jens Jacob Asmussen Worsaae. Snorri Sturluson's description of the marshy and difficult terrain where Magnus and his men were attacked fits the conditions in and around Horse Island, making it a strong candidate for the burial site. According to Finbar McCormick, the people who ambushed Magnus may not have wanted a Christian burial for him and his men, instead burying them near where they had been slain. The Downpatrick runestone monument marking the site was erected in March 2003 to mark the 900th anniversary of his death. The burial site is largely only accessible via the heritage railway in Downpatrick; a halt overlooking the barrow and runestone has been carved by James Higgins and erected by Philip Campbell, local Viking history enthusiast, chairman and founder of the Magnus Viking Association and the Ballydugan Medieval Settlement which is located a short distance from the Runestone on the Drumcullan Road.

=== Succession ===
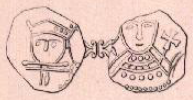
Coin thought to represent the co-rule of Sigurd and Eystein

Magnus was succeeded peacefully by his three sons: Sigurd, Eystein and Olaf. Near the end of Sigurd's reign (he having outlived his brothers) during the late 1120s, the previously unknown Harald Gille came to Norway from the west claiming to be a son of Magnus Barefoot and legitimate successor to the kingdom. Sigurd recognised Harald as his brother (and successor) after Harald walked uninjured over nine burning ploughshares in a trial by ordeal, and he was proclaimed king after Sigurd's death in 1130 with Sigurd's son Magnus Sigurdsson. Since Harald was accompanied by his mother to Norway, Sigurd may have recognised a former lover of his father.

Relations between Harald and Magnus Sigurdsson soured, and several years later Harald had Magnus mutilated and deposed (hence his byname "the Blind"). Soon afterwards, Harald was murdered by another pretender: Sigurd Slembe, who also claimed to be a son of Magnus Barefoot and had been outlawed by Harald. After Harald's death Slembe allied himself with Magnus the Blind, but they were defeated by chieftains loyal to Harald Gille's family in the Battle of Holmengrå. Magnus was killed during the battle; Sigurd was captured, tortured and executed. This began what would become the century-long Norwegian civil-war era.

=== Legacy ===
The earliest-known native Irishman to have been named Magnus may have been the son of Muirchertach's greatest rival, Domnall Ua Lochlainn; Magnus became a name among the Ulaid during the 12th century. According to Morkinskinna, tribute from Ireland was received in Norway as late as about twelve years after Magnus's death.

Magnus became the subject of at least two Gaelic ballads as the character Manus Mór. In the best-known version, he returns to Norway after an expedition to the west; he is killed in the second version. The different versions are probably derived from Magnus's two expeditions. There are also traditions concerning Magnus in Scotland in legends, poems and local history.

In modern times, a "Magnus Barelegs festival" has been held near Downpatrick at Delamont Country park bi-annually. Traditionally held on the last weekend of August every second year (27 and 28 August 2022) it is organised, funded and carried out by the Magnus Viking Association. There is a beer named after his sword, Legbiter. In Norway, according to Førsund, Magnus has "been reduced to a sigh" in history books; little remains to commemorate him. When King Magnus was killed in an ambush by the Men of Ulster, his sword was retrieved and sent home.

== Bibliography ==
Primary sources

- Sturluson, Snorri (c. 1230). Magnus Barefoot's saga (in Heimskringla). English translation: Samuel Laing (London, 1844).
- Theodoric the Monk (c. 1180). The Ancient History of the Norwegian Kings. English translation: David and Ian McDougall (London, 1998).
- Ágrip af Nóregskonungasögum (c. 1180s). English translation: M. J. Driscoll (London, 2008).
- Chronicles of the Kings of Mann and the Isles (c. 1262). English translation: Rev. Goss (Douglas, 1874).
- Fagrskinna (c. 1220s), in Old Norse. Edited by Finnur Jónsson (Copenhagen, 1902).
- Morkinskinna (c. 1220s), in Old Norse. Edited by Finnur Jónsson (Copenhagen, 1932).
- Orkneyinga saga (c. 1230). English translation: George W. Dasent (London, 1894).
- Annals of Inisfallen. English translation (2008).
- Annals of the Four Masters. English translation (2013).
- Annales Cambriæ, in Latin. Edited by John Williams ab Ithel (London, 1860).
- Brut y Tywysogion. English translation: John Williams ab Ithel (1860).

Books

- Førsund, Randi Helene (2012). Titlestad, Bård (ed.). Magnus Berrføtt. Sagakongene (in Norwegian). Saga Bok/Spartacus. ISBN 978-82-430-0584-6.
- Krag, Claus (1995). Helle, Knut (ed.). Vikingtid og rikssamling 800–1130. Aschehougs norgeshistorie. Vol. 2. Oslo: Aschehoug. ISBN 82-03-22015-0.
- Larsen, Stein Ugelvik; Sulebust, Jarle (1994). I balansepunktet: Sunnmøres eldste historie (in Norwegian). Sunnmørsposten Forlag (with Studiegruppa for Sunnmøre, Universitetet i Bergen). ISBN 82-91450-00-5.
- McDonald, R. Andrew (2002). History, Literature, and Music in Scotland, 700–1560. University of Toronto. ISBN 978-0-8020-3601-8.
- Oram, Richard (2011). Domination and Lordship: Scotland, 1070–1230. Edinburgh University. ISBN 978-0-7486-1497-4.
- Skaare, Kolbjørn (1995). Norges mynthistorie (in Norwegian). Vol. 1. Universitetsforlaget. ISBN 82-00-22666-2.
- Skaare, Kolbjørn (1995). Norges mynthistorie (in Norwegian). Vol. 2. Universitetsforlaget. ISBN 82-00-22667-0.
- Wærdahl, Randi Bjørshol (2011). The Incorporation and Integration of the King's Tributary Lands into the Norwegian Realm c. 1195–1397. BRILL. ISBN 978-90-04-20613-7.

Journals

- Duffy, Seán (1992). "Irishmen and Islesmen in the Kingdoms of Dublin and Man, 1052–1171". Ériu. XLIII. Dublin: Royal Irish Academy: 93–133. ISSN 0332-0758. JSTOR 30007421.
- McCormick, Finbar (2009). "The Grave of Magnus Barelegs" (PDF). Ulster Journal of Archaeology. 68: 102–109. ISSN 0082-7355. Archived from the original (PDF) on 4 March 2016.
- Power, Rosemary (October 1986). "Magnus Barelegs' Expeditions to the West". The Scottish Historical Review. 65 (180, part 2). Edinburgh University: 107–132. ISSN 0036-9241.
- Power, Rosemary (October 1994). "The Death of Magnus Barelegs". The Scottish Historical Review. LXXIII, 2 (196). Edinburgh University: 216–223. doi:10.3366/shr.1994.73.2.216. ISSN 0036-9241.
- Power, Rosemary (2005). "Meeting in Norway: Norse-Gaelic relations in the kingdom of Man and the Isles, 1090–1270" (PDF). Saga-Book. XXIX (196). Viking Society for Northern Research, University College London: 5–66. ISSN 0305-9219. Archived from the original (PDF) on 12 April 2013.
- Stølen, Anders (1988). "Frå Jarleætta på Sunnmøre til Blindheim-ætta og Smør-ætta". Norsk Slekthistorisk Tidsskrift (in Norwegian). 31: 259–277. ISSN 0029-2141.

Magnus Barefoot House of Hardrada Cadet branch of the Fairhair dynasty Born: 1073 Died: 24 August 1103
Regnal titles
Preceded by Olaf III	King of Norway; 1093–1103 with Haakon Magnusson (1093–1095)	Succeeded by Sigurd I, Eystein I & Olaf Magnusson
Preceded by Lagman Godredsson	King of the Isles; 1098–1102	Succeeded by Sigurd I
Preceded by Domnall mac Taidc	King of Dublin; 1102–1103	Succeeded by Domnall mac Taidc
