= Sigurd the Crusader =

King of Norway from 1103 to 1130

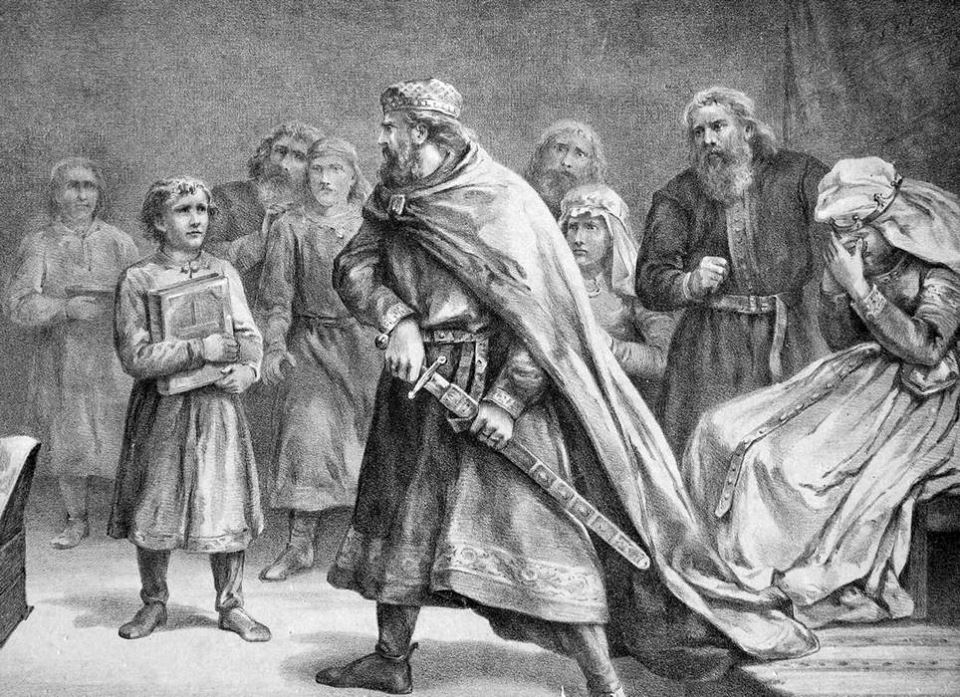
- Illustration of Sigurd

King of Norway
- Reign: 1103 – 26 March 1130
- Predecessor: Magnus Barefoot
- Successor: Magnus Sigurdsson and Harald Gille
- Born: 1089
- Died: 26 March 1130 (aged 40–41); Oslo, Kingdom of Norway
- Burial: Akershus Fortress, prev. St. Hallvard's Cathedral
- Spouses: Bjaðmunjo Mýrjartaksdóttir; Malmfred of Kiev; Cecilia (disputed)
- Issue: Kristin Sigurdsdatter; Magnus Sigurdsson (ill.)
Names
- Sigurd Magnusson
Regnal name
- Sigurd I
- House: Hardrada
- Father: Magnus Barefoot
- Mother: Tora (concubine)

Sigurd the Crusader (Old Norse: Sigurðr Jórsalafari; Norwegian: Sigurd Jorsalfare; 1089 – 26 March 1130), also known as Sigurd Magnusson and Sigurd I, was King of Norway from 1103 to 1130. His rule, together with his half-brothers King Øystein (until Øystein died in 1123) and King Olaf, has been regarded by historians as a golden age for the medieval Kingdom of Norway. He is known as the Crusader King, being the one of three co-regents that took part in the Norwegian Crusade (1107–1110), earning him the eponym "the Crusader". He is regarded to be the first King to take part in a crusade.

== Early life ==
Sigurd was one of the three sons of King Magnus III, the other two being Øystein and Olaf. They were all illegitimate sons of the king with different mothers. The three half-brothers co-ruled the kingdom from 1103 to avoid feuds or war. After Olaf died in 1115 and Øystein in 1123 he ruled as sole regent.

Before being proclaimed King of Norway, Sigurd was styled as King of the Isles and Earl of Orkney. Neither Øystein nor Olav received such prestigious titles. Sigurd passed the Earldom of Orkney on to Haakon Paulsson.

Many historians have viewed Sigurd and Øystein's rule as a golden age for the medieval Kingdom of Norway. The state flourished economically and culturally, allowing Sigurd to participate in the Crusades and gain international recognition and prestige.

== Expedition with Magnus III ==
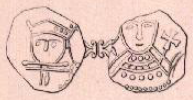
Coin thought to represent the co-rule of Øystein and Sigurd, and thus dated to before 1115

In 1098, Sigurd accompanied his father, King Magnus III, on his expedition to the Orkney Islands, Hebrides and the Irish Sea. He was made Earl of Orkney the same year, following the swift removal of the incumbent earls of Orkney, Paul and Erlend Thorfinnsson. He was also apparently made King of the Isles in that same year, following the overthrow of their king by his father, Magnus. Although Magnus was not directly responsible for the death of the previous king of the Isles, he became the kingdom's next ruler, most likely due to his conquest of the islands. This was the first time the kingdom had been under the direct control of a Norwegian king. It is uncertain whether Sigurd returned home with his father to Norway after the 1098 expedition. However, it is known that he was in Orkney when Magnus returned west in 1102 for his next expedition. While there, a marriage alliance was negotiated between Magnus and Muircheartach Ua Briain. He proclaimed himself High King of Ireland, as he was one of the most powerful rulers in Ireland, as well as the ruler of Dublin. Sigurd was to marry Muirchertach's daughter Bjaðmunjo, a young Irish princess and, for a short period, queen. The marriage might not even have been consummated.

When King Magnus was ambushed and killed in Ulaid by an Irish army in 1103, the 14-year-old Sigurd returned to Norway along with the rest of the Norwegian army, leaving his child-bride behind. Upon arriving in Norway, he and his two brothers, Øystein and Olav, were proclaimed kings of Norway and jointly ruled the kingdom together for some time. The expeditions conducted by Magnus were somewhat profitable to the Kingdom of Norway, as the many islands under Norwegian control generated wealth and a workforce. However the Hebrides and Man quickly re-asserted their independence after Magnus' death.

== Norwegian Crusade ==
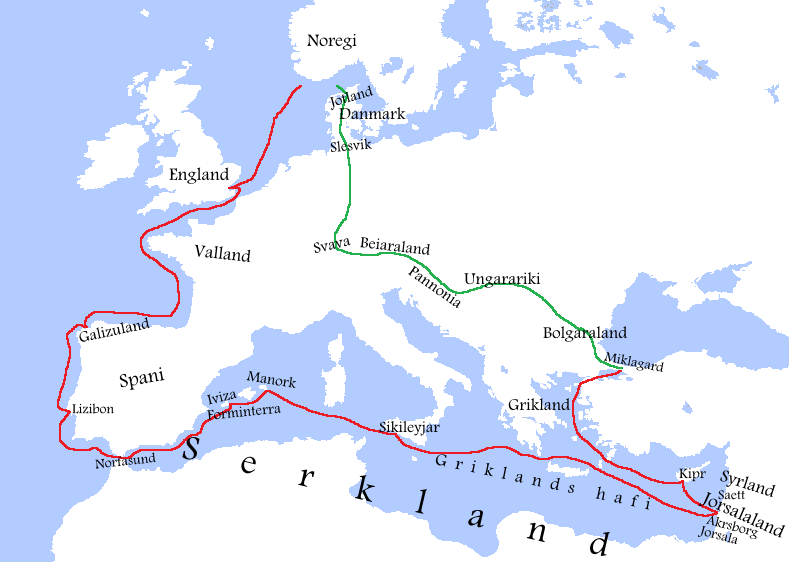
Route of the Norwegian Crusade taken by Sigurd the Crusader. Red: Sea, Green: Land.

In 1107, Sigurd led the Norwegian Crusade to support the newly established Kingdom of Jerusalem, which had been founded after the First Crusade. He was the first European king to personally lead a crusade, and his feats earned him the nickname Jorsalafari. Sigurd possessed a total force of about 5000 men in about 60 ships, as recorded by the sagas. The three kings, Øystein, Olaf and Sigurd, initially debated who should lead the contingent and remain home to rule the kingdom. Sigurd was eventually chosen to lead the crusade, possibly because he was a more experienced traveler, having been on several expeditions with his father, Magnus III, to Ireland and islands in the seas around Scotland.

Sigurd fought in Lisbon, various Mediterranean islands and Palestine. He often fought the enemies amongst his loyal soldiers and relatives; they were continually victorious and vastly successful, gaining considerable amounts of treasure and booty. However, the loot probably never reached Norway, as Sigurd left almost everything he had gained in Constantinople. On his way to Jerusalem (Jorsala) he visited the Norman King Roger II of Sicily in his castle at Palermo.

Upon arriving in the Holy Land, he was greeted by King Baldwin I of Jerusalem. He received a warm welcome and spent a lot of time with the king. The two kings rode to the Jordan River, where Sigurd might have been baptized. King Baldwin asked Sigurd to join him and Ordelafo Faliero, Doge of Venice, in the capture of the coastal city of Sidon, which had been re-fortified by the Fatimids in 1098. The Siege of Sidon was a great success for the crusaders, and the city was conquered on 5 December 1110. Eustace Grenier was granted the Lordship of Sidon after the city was captured. By order of Baldwin and the patriarch of Jerusalem, Ghibbelin of Arles, a splinter was taken from the True Cross and given to Sigurd after the siege as a token of friendship and as a relic for his heroic participation in the crusades. Thereafter, King Sigurd returned to his ships and prepared to leave the Holy Land. They sailed north to the island of Cyprus, where Sigurd stayed for a time. Sigurd then sailed to Constantinople (Miklagard) and entered the city through the gate called the Gold Tower, riding in front of his men. He stayed there for a while, meeting and spending much time with Emperor Alexios I Komnenos.

== Return to Norway ==
Before leaving Constantinople, Sigurd gave all of his ships and many treasures away to Emperor Alexios. In return, the emperor gave him many strong horses for him and his fellow relatives. Sigurd planned to return to Norway over land, but many of his men stayed behind in Constantinople to serve the emperor as part of his Varangian Guard. The trip took three years, and he visited many countries en route. Sigurd traveled from Serbia and Bulgaria through Hungary, Pannonia, Swabia, and Bavaria, where he met with the Emperor Lothar II of the Holy Roman Empire. He later arrived in Denmark, where he was greeted by King Niels of Denmark, who eventually gave him a ship to sail to Norway.

Upon returning to Norway in 1111, Sigurd returned to a flourishing and prosperous kingdom. King Øystein had created a solid and stable country, and the church gained wealth, power, and prestige. During Sigurd's reign, the tithe (a 10% tax to support the church) was introduced in Norway, which significantly strengthened the church in the country. Sigurd founded the diocese of Stavanger. He had been denied a divorce by the bishop in Bergen, so he installed another bishop further south and had him perform the divorce.

Sigurd made his capital in Konghelle (in the vicinity of Kungälv in present-day Sweden) and built a strong castle there. He also kept the relic given to him by King Baldwin, a splinter reputed to be from the True Cross. In 1123, Sigurd once again set out to fight in the name of the church, this time in the Swedish Crusade to Småland in Sweden. The inhabitants had reportedly renounced Christianity and were again worshiping Old Norse deities.

== Death ==
According to the kings' sagas Morkinskinna and Heimskringla, Sigurd experienced manifestations of mental illness in the years before his death. He died in 1130 and was buried in Hallvard's church (Hallvardskirken) in Oslo. Sigurd was married to Malmfred, a daughter of Grand Prince Mstislav I of Kiev and granddaughter of King Inge I of Sweden. They had a daughter, Kristin Sigurdsdatter. He left no legitimate sons. Magnus, his illegitimate son with Borghild Olavsdotter, became king of Norway. He shared the throne in an uneasy peace with another claimant, Harald Gille. This led to a power struggle following Sigurd's death between various illegitimate sons and other royal pretenders, which escalated into a lengthy and devastating civil war. This gave rise to long feuds over who should rule the Kingdom of Norway in the 12th century and early 13th century.

== Primary sources ==
Most of the information gathered about the life of Sigurd and his brothers is taken from the Heimskringla, written by Snorri Sturluson around 1225, and the kings' saga Morkinskinna. Scholars still debate the historical veracity of these works. Sigurd is also mentioned in various European sources.

== In theatrical works and poetry ==
In the 19th century, Bjørnstjerne Bjørnson wrote a historical drama based on the life of the king, with incidental music (titled Sigurd Jorsalfar) composed by Edvard Grieg. The Scottish poet William Forsyth wrote 'King Sigurd the Crusader', illustrated by Edward Burne-Jones in 1862.

== Other sources ==
- Bergan, Halvor (2005) Kong Sigurds Jorsalferd. Den unge kongen som ble Norges helt (Norgesforlaget) ISBN 82-91986-75-4
- Gade, Kari Ellen (2009) ‘Sigurðr I jórsalafari Magnússon (Sjórs) (r. 1103-30)’ in Kari Ellen Gade (ed.), Poetry from the Kings’ Sagas 2: From c. 1035 to c. 1300. Skaldic Poetry of the Scandinavian Middle Ages 2. Turnhout: Brepols
- Morten, Øystein (2014) Jakten på Sigurd Jorsalfare (Spartacus) ISBN 9788243008441

== Related reading ==
- Riley-Smith, Jonathan (1986) The First Crusade and the Idea of Crusading (University of Pennsylvania Press) ISBN 9780812213638

Sigurd Jorsalafar House of Hardrada Cadet branch of the Fairhair dynasty Born: c. 1090 Died: 26 March 1130
Regnal titles
Preceded by Paul and Erlend Thorfinnsson	Earl of Orkney; 1098–1103	Succeeded by Haakon Paulsson
Preceded by Magnus III	King of the Isles; 1102–1103	Succeeded by Lagman
Preceded by Magnus III	King of Norway; 1103–1130 with Olaf Magnusson (1103–1115); Eystein I (1103–1123)	Succeeded by Magnus IV; Harald IV
