= Sigurd Jorsalfar (Grieg) =

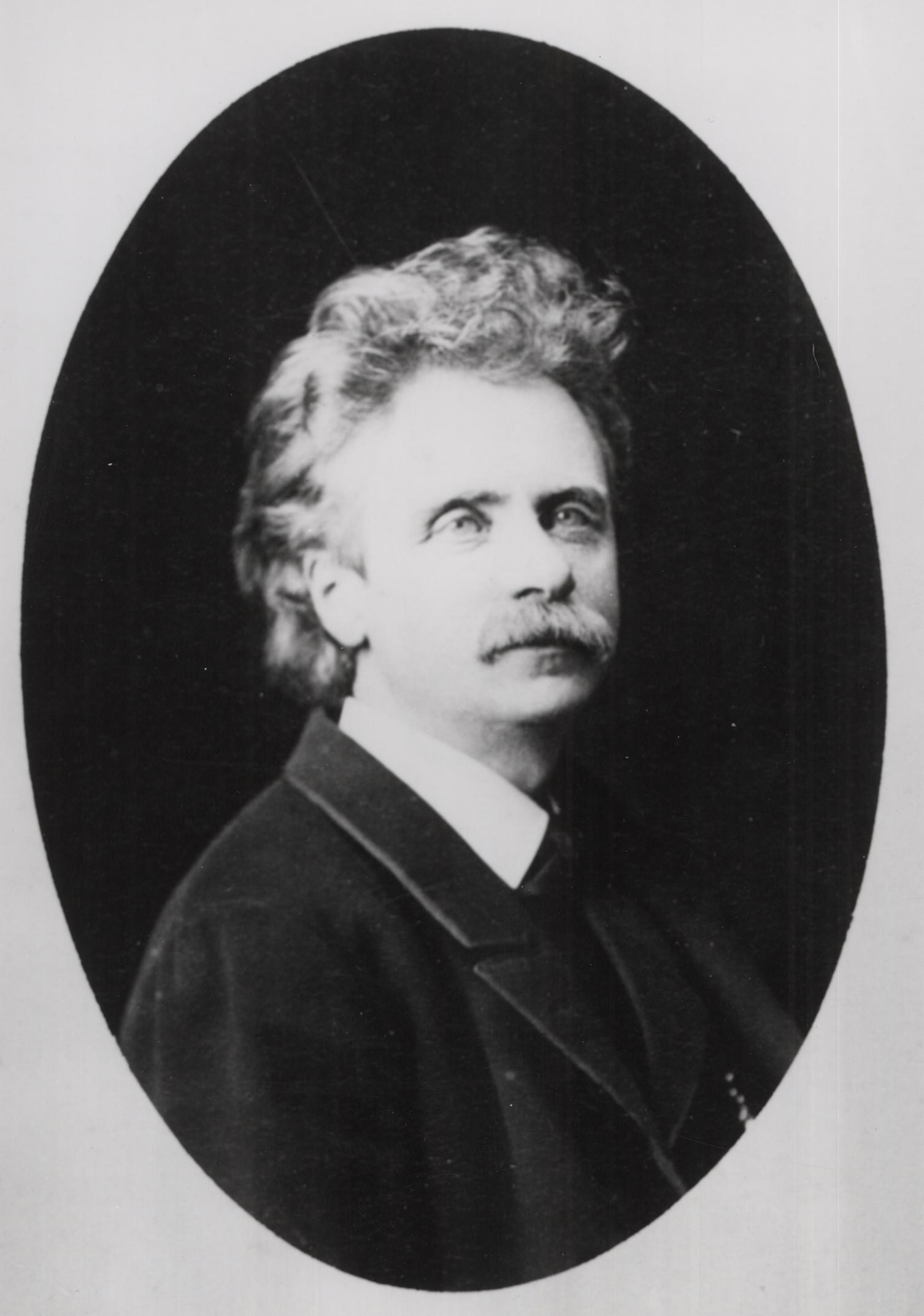
Edvard Grieg ca. 1870

Sigurd Jorsalfar is a work of incidental music composed by Edvard Grieg for a play by Bjørnstjerne Bjørnson celebrating King Sigurd I of Norway. Published as Op. 22, it was first performed in Christiania on 10 April 1872. An orchestral suite compiled by Grieg from the main work and published as Op. 56 was premiered in Oslo on 5 November 1892 and revised by the composer the same year.

The full work consists of nine parts; five are purely orchestral, and four are scored for tenor or baritone, male chorus, and orchestra. Three of the instrumental pieces comprise the suite. The first of these, entitled "In the King's Hall", is a prelude in ternary form which opens with a bassoon and clarinet theme played against plucked strings. The musical material of the exterior sections comes from the trio of a gavotte for piano that Grieg composed in 1867 and left unpublished. The second, "Borghild's Dream", is an intermezzo contrasting a sensitive string melody with an agitated section. The third, "Homage March", opens with trumpet fanfares before presenting its main subject, a martial theme, on four cellos. The middle part, again a trio, is dominated by a melody for the first violins; the work ends with a recapitulation of the movement's first section.

== Incidental music ==
1. Introduction to Act I
2. Borghild's Dream
3. At the Matching Game
4. The Northland Folk
5. Homage March
6. Interlude I
7. Interlude II
8. The King's Song
  Horn Signals

== Suite ==
1. Vorspiel (In der Königshalle). Allegretto semplice
2. Intermezzo (Borghilds Traum). Poco Andante
3. Huldigungsmarsch. Allegro molto
