= Olav Magnusson =

King of Norway from 1103 to 1115

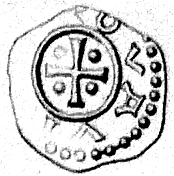
- Coin bearing Olav's name. Last Norwegian monarch positively identified on a coin until Sverre.

King of Norway
- Reign: 1103 – 22 December 1115
- Predecessor: Magnus III
- Successor: Eystein I and Sigurd I
- Born: 1099
- Died: 22 December 1115 (aged 16); Nidaros
- Burial: Nidaros Cathedral
- House: Hardrada
- Father: Magnus III of Norway
- Mother: Sigrid Saxesdatter

Olav Magnusson (1099 – 22 December 1115) was king of Norway in 1103–1115. He was the son of King Magnus Barefoot and Sigrid, daughter of Saxe of Vik.

Olav became king together with his half-brothers Sigurd Jorsalfar and Øystein Magnusson when his father Magnus Barefoot died in 1103. He was king of Norway for twelve years, but unlike his brothers he did not leave a lasting impression on the nation. Since he was still very young, his older brothers acted as regents for his part of the kingdom. In 1107, King Sigurd was to lead a Norwegian crusade in support of the newly established crusader Kingdom of Jerusalem, returning to Norway in 1111. During this period, King Øystein served as regent for his brother, using his energy and willpower to create a strong and stable country.

In 1115, Olav fell ill and died when he was only 16 years old. He was succeeded by his co-ruler brothers. He was counted as "Olav IV" until 1957 (when Olav V became king, who otherwise would have been VI), and counting him was dropped from the official Norwegian list of monarchs.

Olav Magnusson House of Hardrada Cadet branch of the Fairhair dynasty Born: 1099 Died: 1115
Regnal titles
Preceded by Magnus III	King of Norway; 1103–1115 with Sigurd I Eystein I	Succeeded by Sigurd I & Eystein I
