= List of princesses and grand princesses consort of Kiev =

This is a list of princesses and grand princesses consort of Kiev, the wives of the (grand) princes of Kiev (modern Kyiv).

Oleg the Wise was the first undisputed "prince of Kiev", although nothing is known of his wife (or wives). Yaroslav the Wise was the first undisputed "grand prince of Kiev". Therefore, Kievan princely wives before 1019 are known as princesses consort, and after 1019 as grand princesses consort of Kiev.

== Princesses and grand princesses consort of Kiev ==
Name (House)	Father	Birth	Marriage	Became consort	Ceased to be consort	Death	Spouse
Unknown	-	-	-	-	-	-	Oleg the Wise
Olga	-	c.890	c.903	914	945	969	Igor I
Malusha	-	-	-	-	-	-	Sviatoslav I
a Greek nun	-	-	-	-	-	-	Yaropolk I
Allogia	-	-	-	-	-	-	Volodimer I
a Greek nun, widow of Yaropolk I	-	-	-	-	-	-	Volodimer I
Rogned' of Polotsk	Rogvolod	962	-	-	988	1002	Volodimer I
Adela	-	-	-	-	-	-	Volodimer I
Malfrida	-	-	-	-	1000	-	Volodimer I
Anna Porphyrogenita (Macedonian dynasty)	Romanos II; Byzantine Emperor	13 March 963	989		1011		Volodimer I
Unknown (Ottonians)	a granddaughter of emperor Otto the Great	-	-	-	-	-	Volodimer I
Unknown (Piasts)	Bolesław I the Brave; Duke of Poland	-	1013		1018		Sviatopolk I
Ingegerd Olofsdotter (Munsö)	Olof Skötkonung; King of Sweden	1001	1019		1050		Yaroslav I
Gertrude of Poland (Piasts)	Mieszko II of Poland; King of Poland	1025	1054		1073	1104	Iziaslav I
Cecilia (Note: Slavonic: Killikiya or Kelikia.)	-	-	1043–1047		-	-	Sviatoslav II
Oda of Stade (Udonids)	Lothair Udo I Margrave of Nordmark	c. 1040	c. 1065	1073	1076	1087	Sviatoslav II
Maria (?) (Macedonian dynasty?)	possibly Constantine IX Monomachos; Byzantine Emperor	-	-	-	-	1067	Vsevolod I
Anna Polovetskaya	Cuman khan	-	1068		1093	1111	Vsevolod I
- (Přemyslid dynasty?)	possibly Spytihněv II; Duke of Bohemia	-	-	-	-	-	Sviatopolk II
Olena	Tugorkhan of the Kypchaks	-	1094	-	-	-	Sviatopolk II
Gytha of Wessex (House of Godwin)	Harold Godwinson; King of England	c. 1053/1061	-	-	-	1098 or 1107	Volodimer II
Eufimia (Byzantine noblewoman)		-	-	-	-	1107	Volodimer II
Christina Ingesdotter (Stenkil)	Inge the Elder; King of Sweden	-	1090–1096	She was his consort before he became Grand Prince of Kiev		18 January 1122	Mstislav I
Ljubava Saviditsch	Dmitry Saviditsch, a nobleman of Novgorod	-	-	-	-	-	Mstislav I
Helena (Ossetian princess)	-	-	-	-	-	-	Yaropolk II
Maria Mstislavna of Kiev (Olgovichi of Chernigov)	Mstislav I Grand Prince of Kiev	-	1116	1139	-	1179	Vsevolod II
Agnes (Hohenstaufen)	Conrad III; King of Germany	c. 1117	c. 1130	1146; 1151	1149; 1151	1151	Iziaslav II
Princess Bagrationi (Bagrationi)	Demetrius I King of Georgia	-	1154			1210	Iziaslav II
Unknown	Aepa, son of Osen'; Cuman prince	-	1108	-	-	-	Yuri I
Helena (Komnenos?)	possibly Isaac Komnenos; Byzantine sebastokrator	-	-	-	-	-	Yuri I
Agnes of Poland (Piasts)	Bolesław III Wrymouth; Duke of Poland	1137	1151	1167	1170	1182	Mstislav II
Unknown (Vukanović)	Beloš Vukanović; Prince of Serbia	-	1150	-	-	-	Volodimer III
Verkhuslava of Kiev (Yurievichi of Suzdalia)	Vsevolod the Big Nest; Prince of Vladimir	1181	1189	1204	1206	1222	Rostislav II
Anna II of Kiev (Iziaslavichi of Turov)	Yuri of Turov	c. 1157	1172	intermittently since 1173	1205	1205	Rurik Rostislavich
Constance of Hungary (Árpáds)	Béla IV; King of Hungary	c. 1237	c. 1246/7	1271	1288/1302	1288/1302	Leo I

== See also ==
- Conversion of Volodimer
- Family life and children of Vladimir I
- Grand Prince of Kiev
- Grand Prince of Vladimir
- Kievan Rus'
- Primary Chronicle
- Rurikids
- List of Russian royal consorts

== Bibliography ==
- Dimnik, Martin (January 2004). "The Title "Grand Prince" in Kievan Rus'". Mediaeval Studies. 66: 253–312. doi:10.1484/J.MS.2.306512.
- Martin, Janet (2007). Medieval Russia: 980–1584. Second Edition. E-book. Cambridge: Cambridge University Press. ISBN 978-0-511-36800-4.
