= List of Norwegian royal consorts =

Spouses of Norwegian monarchs

This is a list of queens consort of Norway. The role and position of the queen consort changed considerably over the centuries. Some queens exercised significant political influence alongside their husbands, while others served as regents.

The incumbent Queen consort of Norway is Queen Mette-Marit, who became Queen of Norway when her husband King Haakon VIII accseded to the Norwegian throne upon the death of his father King Harald V.

Royal marriages were traditionally influenced by political considerations and were often used to establish or strengthen alliances between ruling dynasties. For much of Norwegian history, members of the royal family were expected to marry within the European nobility and royalty; consequently, many Norwegian queens consort were born outside Norway.

Due to Norway's unions with Denmark and Sweden, the queens consort from 1450 to 1814 were also queens consort of Denmark, while those from 1814 to 1905 were also queens consort of Sweden.

== Fairhair dynasty ==
Picture	Name	Father	Birth	Marriage	Became Consort	Ceased to be Consort	Death	Spouse
Non-contemporary	Ragnhild the Mighty	Eirik of Jutland	–	885		888; Her death	–	Harald I
Non-contemporary	Gunnhild Gormsdóttir of Denmark	Gorm the Old of Denmark (Knytlinga)	910	922	931 husband's accession	934 husband's deposition	after 970	Eric I

== Knýtling dynasty ==
Picture	Name	Father	Birth	Marriage	Became Consort	Ceased to be Consort	Death	Spouse
	Tove of the Obotrites	Mstivoj	–	January 963	976 husband's conquest	985/6 husband's death	–	Harald Bluetooth

== Unclassified ==
Picture	Name	Father	Birth	Marriage	Became Consort	Ceased to be Consort	Death	Spouse
Non-contemporary	Tyri Haraldsdatter of Denmark	Harald Bluetooth (Knytlinga)	–	998		9 September 1000 husband's death	18 September 1000	Olaf I

== Knýtling dynasty ==
Picture	Name	Father	Birth	Marriage	Became Consort	Ceased to be Consort	Death	Spouse
	Gunhild of Wenden [legendary]	Burislav of Wendland	perhaps identical to Sigrid and or the daughter of Mieszko I.					Sweyn Forkbeard
Non-contemporary	Sigrid Storråda [legendary]	Skagul Toste	Den Store Danske Encyklopædi identifies the consort of Sweyn I as Gunhild, and considers the Sigrid the Haughty of the sagas to be based on her, but predominantly a work of "complete fiction". She subsequently married Sweyn II, who later divorced her on orders from the church, since both of them were grandchildren of the Slavic consort of Eric the Victorious of Sweden. Source: Den Store Danske Encyklopædi, CD-ROM edition, entries Gunhild and Sigrid Storråde.					Sweyn Forkbeard
	(name unknown; reconstructed as Świętosława)	Mieszko I of Poland (Piast)	perhaps identical to one or both of previous					Sweyn Forkbeard

== St. Olaf dynasty ==
Picture	Name	Father	Birth	Marriage	Became Consort	Ceased to be Consort	Death	Spouse
Non-contemporary	Astrid Olofsdotter	Olof Skötkonung (Munsö)	–	February 1019		1028 husband flees after Denmark invades	1035	Olaf II

== Knýtling dynasty ==
Picture	Name	Father	Birth	Marriage	Became Consort	Ceased to be Consort	Death	Spouse
Non-contemporary	Emma of Normandy	Richard I, Duke of Normandy (Normandy)	985	July 1017	1028 husband's conquest	12 November 1035 husband's death	6 March 1052	Canute II

== Hardrada dynasty ==
Picture	Name	Father	Birth	Marriage	Became Consort	Ceased to be Consort	Death	Spouse
	Elisaveta Yaroslavna of Kiev	Yaroslav I, Grand Prince of Kiev (Rurikid)	c. 1025	Winter of 1043–44	25 October 1047 husband's accession	25 September 1066 husband's death	c. 1067	Harald III
	Ingerid Swensdatter of Denmark	Sweyn II of Denmark (Estridsen)	?	c. 1067		c. 1093 husband's death	?	Olaf III
	Margaret Fredkulla Ingesdotter of Sweden	Inge I of Sweden (Stenkil)	1080s	c. 1101		August 1103 husband's death	c. 1130	Magnus III
	Ingebjørg Guttormsdatter	Guttorm Toresson	?	?	August 1103 husband's accession	29 August 1123 husband's death	?	Eystein I
	Malmfred Mstislavna of Kiev	Mstislav I, Grand Prince of Kiev (Rurikid)	c. 1105	1116 and 1120		26 March 1130 husband's death	after 1137	Sigurd I
	Christine Knutsdatter of Denmark	Canute Lavard (Estridsen)	c. 1118	c. 1132		c. 1133		Magnus IV

=== Gille dynasty ===
Picture	Name	Father	Birth	Marriage	Became Consort	Ceased to be Consort	Death	Spouse
	Ingrid Ragnvaldsdotter of Sweden	Prince Ragnvald Ingesson of Sweden (Stenkil)	1100–10	c. 1134		c. 1136 husband's death	after 1161	Harald IV
	Ragna Nikolasdatter	Nikolas Måse	?	?	c. 1142 husband's accession	c. 1157		Eystein II

=== Hardrada (Skakke) dynasty ===
Picture	Name	Father	Birth	Marriage	Became Consort	Ceased to be Consort	Death	Spouse
	Estrid Bjørnsdotter	Björn Byrdasvend	?	?	4 February 1161 husband's accession	c. 1176		Magnus V

== Sverre dynasty ==
Picture	Name	Father	Birth	Marriage	Became Consort	Ceased to be Consort	Death	Spouse
	Margaret Eriksdotter of Sweden	Saint Erik (Erik)	?	c. 1189		9 March 1202 husband's death	c. 1209	Sverre
	Margrete Skulesdatter	Skule Bårdsson	c. 1208	25 May 1225		15 December 1263 husband's death	c. 1270	Haakon IV
	Rikissa Birgersdotter	Birger Jarl (Bjälbo)	c. 1237	c. 1251		5 May 1257 husband's death	after 1288	Haakon Haakonsson the Young
	Ingeborg Eriksdotter of Denmark	Eric IV of Denmark (Estridsen)	c. 1244	11 September 1261	16 December 1263 husband's accession	9 May 1280 husband's death	c. 1287	Magnus VI
	Margaret of Scotland	Alexander III of Scotland (Dunkeld)	28 February 1261	c. 1281		9 April 1283		Eric II
	Isabel Bruce	Robert de Brus, 6th Lord of Annandale (Bruce)	c. 1272	c. 1293		15 July 1299 husband's death	1358	Eric II
	Euphemia of Rügen	Günther, Count of Arnstein	c. 1270	Spring of 1299	15 July 1299 husband's accession	c. 1312		Haakon V

== House of Bjälbo ==
Picture	Name	Father	Birth	Marriage	Became Consort	Ceased to be Consort	Death	Spouse
Non-contemporary	Blanche of Namur	John I, Marquis of Namur (Dampierre)	1320	5 November 1335		15 August 1343 husband's deposition	1363	Magnus VII
Non-contemporary	Margaret Valdemarsdatter of Denmark	Valdemar IV of Denmark (Estridsen)	1353	9 April 1363		11 September 1380 husband's death	28 October 1412	Haakon VI

== House of Pomerania ==
Picture	Name	Father	Birth	Marriage	Became Consort	Ceased to be Consort	Death	Spouse
Non-contemporary	Philippa of England	Henry IV of England (Lancaster)	4 June 1394	26 October 1406		7 January 1430		Eric III

== House of Palatinate-Neumarkt ==
Picture	Name	Father	Birth	Marriage	Became Consort	Ceased to be Consort	Death	Spouse
	Dorothea of Brandenburg	John, Margrave of Brandenburg-Kulmbach (Hohenzollern)	1430–31	12 September 1445		6 January 1448 husband's death	10 November 1495	Christopher

== House of Bonde ==
Picture	Name	Father	Birth	Marriage	Became Consort	Ceased to be Consort	Death	Spouse
	Katarina Karlsdotter of Bjurum	Karl Ormsson Gumsehuvud (Gumsehufvud)	1418	5 October 1438	20 November 1449 husband's accession	June 1450 husband's deposition	7 September 1450	Charles I

== House of Oldenburg ==
Picture	Name	Father	Birth	Marriage	Became Consort	Ceased to be Consort	Death	Spouse
	Dorothea of Brandenburg	John, Margrave of Brandenburg-Kulmbach (Hohenzollern)	1430–31	28 October 1449	June 1450 husband's accession	21 May 1481 husband's death	10 November 1495	Christian I
Interregnum (1481–1483)
	Christina of Saxony	Ernest, Elector of Saxony (Wettin)	25 December 1461	6 September 1478	1483 husband's accession	20 February 1513 husband's death	8 December 1521	John
	Isabella of Austria	Philip the Handsome, King of Castile (Habsburg)	18 July 1501	12 August 1515		20 January 1523 husband's deposition	19 January 1526	Christian II
	Sophie of Pomerania	Bogislaw X, Duke of Pomerania (Pomerania)	1498	9 October 1518	1524 husband's accession	10 April 1533 husband's death	13 May 1568	Frederick I
Interregnum (1533–1537)
	Dorothea of Saxe-Lauenburg	Magnus I, Duke of Saxe-Lauenburg (Ascania)	9 July 1511	29 October 1525	1537 husband's accession	1 January 1559 husband's death	7 October 1571	Christian III
	Sophie of Mecklenburg-Güstrow	Ulrich III, Duke of Mecklenburg-Güstrow (Mecklenburg-Güstrow)	4 September 1557	20 July 1572		4 April 1588 husband's death	14 October 1631	Frederick II
	Anne Catherine of Brandenburg	Joachim III Frederick, Elector of Brandenburg (Hohenzollern)	26 June 1575	27 November 1597		8 April 1612		Christian IV
	Sophie Amalie of Brunswick-Lüneburg	George, Duke of Brunswick-Lüneburg (Welf)	24 March 1628	1 October 1643	6 July 1648 husband's accession	9 February 1670 husband's death	20 February 1685	Frederick III
	Charlotte Amalie of Hesse-Kassel	William VI, Landgrave of Hesse-Kassel (Hesse-Kassel)	27 April 1650	25 June 1667	9 February 1670 husband's accession	25 August 1699 husband's death	27 March 1714	Christian V
	Louise of Mecklenburg-Güstrow	Gustav Adolf, Duke of Mecklenburg-Güstrow (Mecklenburg-Güstrow)	28 August 1667	5 December 1695	25 August 1699 husband's accession	15 March 1721		Frederick IV
	Anne Sophie Reventlow	Conrad, Count Reventlow (Reventlow)	16 April 1693	4 April 1721		12 October 1730 husband's death	7 January 1743	Frederick IV
	Sophia Magdalene of Brandenburg-Kulmbach	Christian Heinrich, Margrave of Brandenburg-Bayreuth-Kulmbach (Hohenzollern)	28 November 1700	7 August 1721	12 October 1730 husband's accession	6 August 1746 husband's death	27 May 1770	Christian VI
	Louise of Great Britain	George II of Great Britain (Hanover)	7 December 1724	11 December 1743	6 August 1746 husband's accession	19 December 1751		Frederick V
	Juliana Maria of Brunswick-Wolfenbüttel	Ferdinand Albert II, Duke of Brunswick-Wolfenbüttel (Brunswick-Bevern)	4 September 1729	8 July 1752		13 January 1766 husband's death	10 October 1796	Frederick V
	Caroline Matilda of Great Britain	Frederick, Prince of Wales (Hanover)	11 July 1751	8 November 1766		10 May 1775		Christian VII
	Marie Sophie of Hesse-Kassel	Landgrave Charles of Hesse-Kassel (Hesse-Kassel)	28 October 1767	31 July 1790	13 March 1808 husband's accession	14 January 1814 husband's deposition	22 March 1852	Frederick VI

== House of Holstein-Gottorp ==
Picture	Coat of Arms	Name	Father	Birth	Marriage	Became Consort	Ceased to be Consort	Death	Spouse
		Hedwig Elizabeth Charlotte of Holstein-Gottorp	Frederick August I, Duke of Oldenburg (Holstein-Gottorp)	22 March 1759	7 July 1774	4 November 1814 husband's accession	5 February 1818 husband's death	20 June 1818	Charles II

== House of Bernadotte ==
Picture	Coat of Arms	Name	Father	Birth	Marriage	Became Consort	Ceased to be Consort	Death	Spouse
		Désirée Clary	François Clary	8 November 1777	17 August 1798	5 February 1818 husband's accession	8 March 1844 husband's death	17 December 1860	Charles III John
		Joséphine de Beauharnais	Eugène de Beauharnais (Beauharnais)	14 March 1807	19 June 1823	8 March 1844 husband's accession	8 July 1859 husband's death	7 June 1876	Oscar I
		Louise van Oranje-Nassau	Prince Frederick of the Netherlands (Orange-Nassau)	5 August 1828	19 June 1850	8 July 1859 husband's accession	30 March 1871		Charles IV
		Sophia of Nassau	William, Duke of Nassau (Nassau-Weilburg)	9 July 1836	6 June 1857	18 September 1872 husband's accession	26 October 1905 husband renounces claim after the Union dissolved	30 December 1913	Oscar II

== House of Glücksburg ==
Picture	Coat of Arms	Name	Father	Birth	Marriage	Became Consort	Ceased to be Consort	Death	Spouse	Ref
		Maud of Wales	Edward VII of the British Empire (Saxe-Coburg and Gotha)	26 November 1869	22 July 1896	18 November 1905 husband's accession	20 November 1938		Haakon VII	
		Sonja Haraldsen	Karl August Haraldsen	4 July 1937	29 August 1968	17 January 1991 husband's accession	28 August 2026 husband's death	–	Harald V	
		Mette-Marit Tjessem Høiby	Sven O. Høiby	19 August 1973	25 August 2001	28 August 2026 husband's accession	Incumbent	–	Haakon VIII	

== See also ==
- List of Norwegian monarchs
