= Malmfred of Kiev =

12th-century Queen of Denmark and Norway

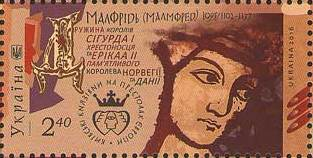
- Malmfred stamp of Ukraine
- Born: between 1095 and 1102
- Died: after 1137
- Occupation: Queen consort
- Spouse(s): Sigurd I of Norway; Eric II of Denmark
- Children: Kristin Sigurdsdatter
- Parents: Mstislav I of Kiev (father); Christina Ingesdotter of Sweden (mother)

Malmfred of Kiev (between 1095 and 1102 – died after 1137) was a Norwegian and Danish queen consort, wife first to King Sigurd I of Norway and second to king Eric II of Denmark.

== Life ==
Malmfred was born to Grand Prince Mstislav I of Kiev and Princess Christina Ingesdotter of Sweden, paternal granddaughter of Gytha of Wessex and maternal granddaughter of King Inge the Elder of Sweden. She was born between 1095 and 1102.

Snorre Sturlasson called her Malmfred Haraldsdotter of Holmgard, which was a Norwegian version of her name. Her sister, Ingeborg of Kiev, was married to the Danish prince Canute Lavard. Malmfred was married to Sigurd between 1116 and 1120. She had a daughter, Kristin Sigurdsdatter, mother of king Magnus V of Norway. Tradition says that the marriage was unhappy. Her husband repudiated her in 1128 and remarried Cecilia.

In 1130, her ex-husband's illegitimate son became king, and she left for Denmark, where she married Erik Emune. In 1131, she arranged the marriage between her former stepson Magnus IV of Norway and her sister's daughter, Christine of Denmark; they were married in 1133. Christine's husband, King Magnus, supported the struggle of Malmfrid, Erik and Christine's father, Canute, against King Niels of Denmark. In 1133, Erik and Malmfrid fled Denmark for Norway and the protection of Magnus. Afterward, Queen Christine, however, found out that Magnus had plans to betray them, she warned them. Erik and Malmfrid then allied themselves with the rival of King Magnus, King Harald IV Gille of Norway. King Magnus then separated from Queen Christine.

In 1134, Eric became king, and she queen, of Denmark. She had no more children. In 1137, her second husband, Eric, was murdered at the thing in south Jutland. Malmfred was not mentioned after this date.

== Bibliography ==
- "The Large Danish Encyclopedia" (1998 edition)
- Norwegian Wikipedia no:Malmfrid Mstislavsdatter
- Store norske leksikon
- Norsk biografisk leksikon
- Edvard Bull. »Magnus Blinde» I: Norsk biografisk leksikon, 1. utg. Bd 9. 1938
- Nils Petter Thuesen. »Magnus 4 Sigurdsson Blinde» I: Norsk biografisk leksikon, 2. utg. Bd 6. 2003.
- Knut Helle. Aschehougs Norgeshistorie. Bd 3. Under kirke og kongemakt. 1995

Malmfred of Kiev Monomakhovichi Born: 1105 Died: after 1137
Royal titles
Preceded by Ingebjørg Guttormsdatter	Queen consort of Norway; 1116/20–1128	Succeeded by Christine of Denmark
Preceded by Ulvhild	Queen consort of Denmark; 1134–1137	Succeeded by Lutgard of Salzwedel
