= 2025 European Youth Orienteering Championships =

- Location: Brno, Czech Republic
- Dates: 17–20 July 2025

The 2025 European Youth Orienteering Championships was an edition of the European U16 and U18 Orientering Championships, organised by the International Orienteering Federation. It was held in Brno, Czech Republic, from 17 to 20 July 2025.

== Medal overview ==
=== Men ===
Event	Gold	Silver	Bronze
U18
Sprint	(Poland) Tomasz Rzenca	(Finland) Rasmus Toyryla	(Norway) Magnus Sigurdsson
Long distance	(Hungary) Mihaly Csoboth	(Switzerland) Lavio Mueller	(Czech Republic) Martin Bulička
Relay	Czech Republic; Martin Bulička; Ctibor Podrabsky; Vladimir Srb	Finland; Vilho Hietala; Aapo Virkajarvi; Rasmus Toyryla	Hungary; Marton Hegedus; Mark Levente Bujdoso; Mihaly Csoboth
U16
Sprint	(Estonia) Erik Marten Zernant	(Spain) Ekain Fernandez Garcia	(Czech Republic) Matouš Dittrich
Long distance	(Spain) Ekain Fernandez Garcia	(Finland) Joakim Savinainen	(Estonia) Erik Marten Zernant
Relay	Finland; KasperEkonoja; Joakim Savinainen; Veeti Viippola	Switzerland; Taavi Caboussat; Linus Pusterla; Maxim Bertschi	Czech Republic; Martin Bulička; Ctibor Podrabsky; Vladimir Srb

=== Women ===
Event	Gold	Silver	Bronze
U18
Sprint	(Israel) Ofri Yacobi	(Switzerland) Lenia Grimm	(Latvia) Ilze Jumike
Long distance	(Switzerland) Lotta Marit Luethi	(Czech Republic) Markéta Hanušová	(France) Fanny Delahaye
Relay	Czech Republic; Anna Kynclova; Kristyna Finstrlova; Kristyna Finstrlova	France; Sonia Jolly Jansson; Ambre Dufour; Fanny Delahaye	Sweden; Elvira Karmstig; Elsa Ehrenborg; Izabella Ljungberg
U16
Sprint	(Finland) Anni Jantunen	(Switzerland) Seraina Baer	(Finland) Venla Mennala
Long distance	(Switzerland) Carla Castelli	(Czech Republic) Ela Lošťáková	(Czech Republic) Matilda Tomášková
Relay	Czech Republic; Ela Lostakova; Matilda Tomaskova; Carolina Mullis	Hungary; Boroka Danko; Aliz Heizer; Sara Szakal Biro	France; Louise Cathala; Caroline Harnist; Juliette Pellissier

=== Medals table ===
* Host nation (Czech Republic)

Rank	Nation	Gold	Silver	Bronze	Total
1	Czech Republic (CZE)	3	2	4	9
2	Finland (FIN)	2	3	1	6
3	Switzerland (SUI)	2	0	4	6
4	Hungary (HUN)	1	1	1	3
5	Spain (ESP)	1	1	0	2
6	Estonia (EST)	1	0	1	2
7	Israel (ISR)	1	0	0	1
7	Poland (POL)	1	0	0	1
9	France (FRA)	0	1	2	3
10	Latvia (LAT)	0	0	1	1
10	Norway (NOR)	0	0	1	1
10	Sweden (SWE)	0	0	1	1
Totals (12 entries)		12	8	16	36
