= Björnsdotter =

Scandinavian matronymic

Björnsdotter and Bjørnsdatter are Scandinavian matronymics. Notable people with the name include:

- Christina of Denmark, Queen of Sweden (Danish: Kirstine Bjørnsdatter, Swedish: Kristina Björnsdotter)
- Estrid Bjørnsdatter or Estrid Bjørnsdotter, Queen of Norway from 1170 to 1176
- Cécilia Catharina Björnsdotter Rhode or Cécilia Rodhe (born 1961), Swedish beauty pageant titleholder
- Karin Björnsdotter Wanngård or Karin Wanngård (born 1975), Swedish politician
