= Ingebjørg Guttormsdatter =

Queen of Norway from 1103 to 1123

Queen consort of Norway
- Tenure: 1103–1123
- Spouse: Eystein I of Norway
- Issue: Maria Øysteinsdatter
- Father: Guttorm Toresson

Ingebjørg Guttormsdatter (12th century) was a medieval Norwegian Queen consort and spouse of King Eystein I of Norway (Øystein Magnusson).

Ingebjørg Guttormsdatter was the daughter of Guttorm Toresson from Lillehammer. Ingebjorg grandfather's mother, Isrid Gudbrandsdatter, was the daughter of Gudbrand Kula from Oppland and sister of Åsta Gudbrandsdatter, who was the mother of Kings Olaf II and Harald Hardrada. Ingeborg was thus a cousin of her husband.

Queen Ingebjørg Guttormsdatter and King Eystein had a daughter, Maria Øysteinsdatter (María Eysteinsdóttir), who was the mother of royal pretender Olav Ugjæva. Olaf was named king in 1166, but was subsequently defeated by King Magnus V of Norway (Magnus Erlingsson) and forced to flee the country.

Ingebjørg Guttormsdatter was, alongside Ragna Nikolasdatter and Estrid Bjørnsdotter, known as one of few acknowledged queen consorts in Norway between the mid 11th century to the 13th century not to have been foreign princesses.

== Other sources ==
- Imsen, Steinar Våre dronninger (Grøndahl og Dreyer, 1991) ISBN 82-09-10678-3

Preceded by Margaret Fredkulla	Queen Consort of Norway; 1103–1123	Succeeded by Malmfred of Kiev
