= St. Olav's Guild =

Crafts organization in Tallinn, Estonia

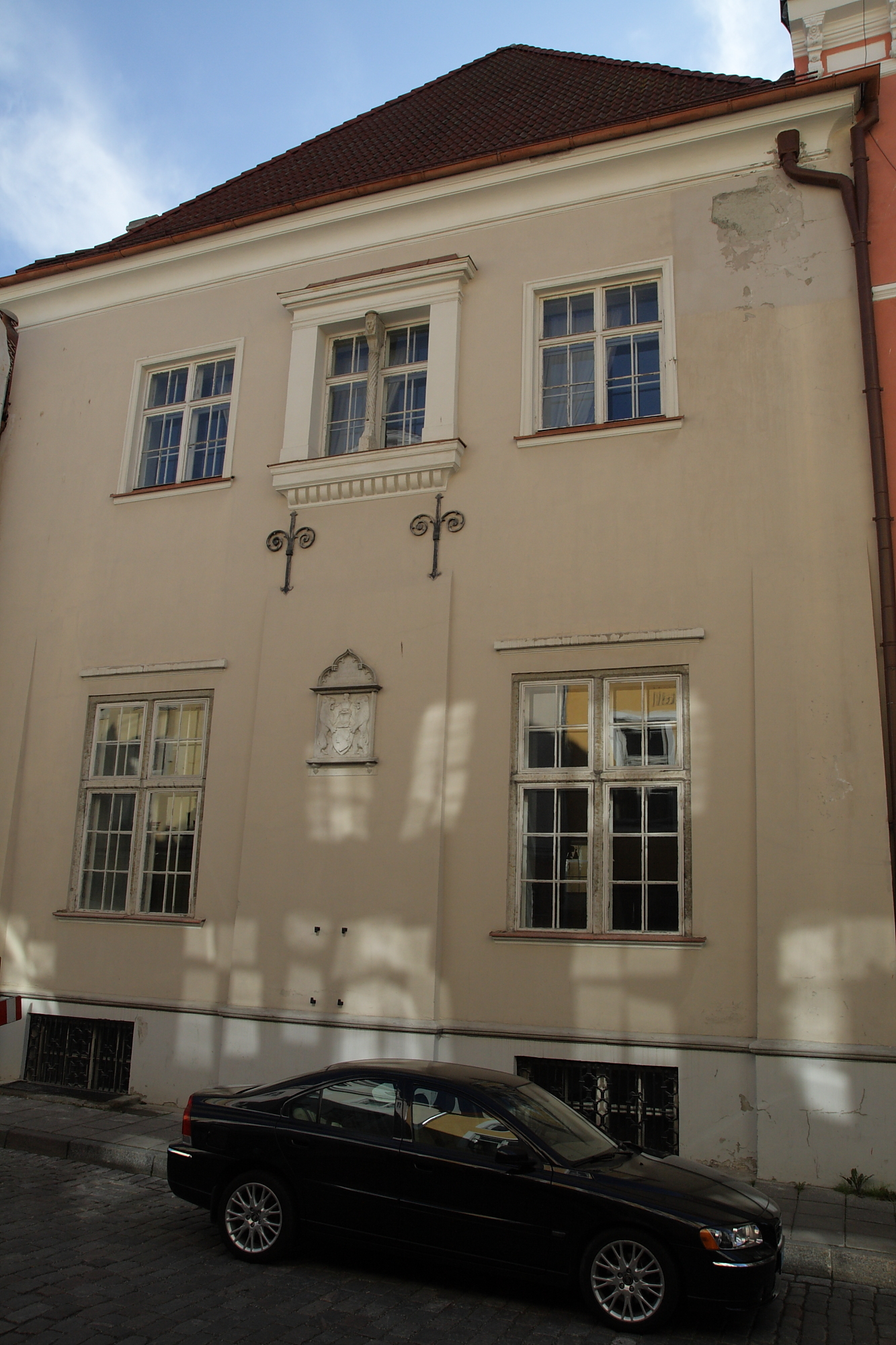
- Olav's Guild Hall
- Merged into: Canute Guild
- Dissolved: 1698
- Headquarters: Pikk 24
- Coordinates: 59°26′19″N 24°44′48″E

St. Olav's Guild (Estonian: Oleviste gild) was a guild in Tallinn, Estonia. The guild was named after Olaf II of Norway.

The guild was established probably in 13th or 14th century. The first mentioning was in 1341.

The guild was composed by artisans.

In 1689, the guild was closed and most of its members were joined with Canute Guild.
