= Christina of Denmark (disambiguation) =

Christina or Christine of Denmark may refer to:

- Princesses of Denmark:
  - Christina of Denmark (1521–1590), was the daughter of Christian II of Denmark, married firstly Francesco II Sforza, Duke of Milan, and secondly Francis I, Duke of Lorraine.
  - Christina of Denmark, Queen of Norway (1118–1139), daughter of Canute Lavard, married Magnus IV of Norway
  - Christina of Denmark, Queen of Sweden (1120/25-1170), daughter of Björn Ironside, married Eric IX of Sweden
- One queen consort of Denmark:
  - Christina of Saxony (1461–1521), wife of John of Denmark
