= Kristin Sigurdsdatter =

12th-century Norwegian princess

- Born: c. 1125
- Died: c. 1178 (aged 52–53)
- Spouse: Erling Skakke
- Issue: Magnus Erlingsson
- Old Norse: Kristin Sigurðardóttir
- House: Hardrada
- Father: Sigurd the Crusader
- Mother: Malmfred of Kiev

Kristin Sigurdsdatter (ca. 1125–1178) was a Norwegian princess and mother of King Magnus V of Norway.

Kristin was a daughter of King Sigurd I of Norway and Malmfred of Kiev. She married Erling Skakke (Erling Ormsson Skakke), a Norwegian nobleman who had earned his reputation crusading with Rögnvald Kali Kolsson, the Earl of Orkney. They had a son, Magnus Erlingsson.

Kristin was the only legitimate child of King Sigurd. In 1130, King Sigurd died with no legitimate sons. An illegitimate son, Magnus Sigurdsson (Magnus 4 Sigurdsson Blinde), became king of Norway jointly with his uncle Harald Gille. Harald Gille had four sons, Inge, Eystein, Sigurd and Magnus Haraldsson, all of whom became kings of Norway.

Following the death of King Inge in 1161, Kristin's son Magnus was crowned king at the age of eight. He ruled as king of Norway until his death in 1184.
