= John Komnenos the Fat =

Usurper of the Byzantine Empire (died 1201)

John Komnenos
- Usurper of the Byzantine Empire
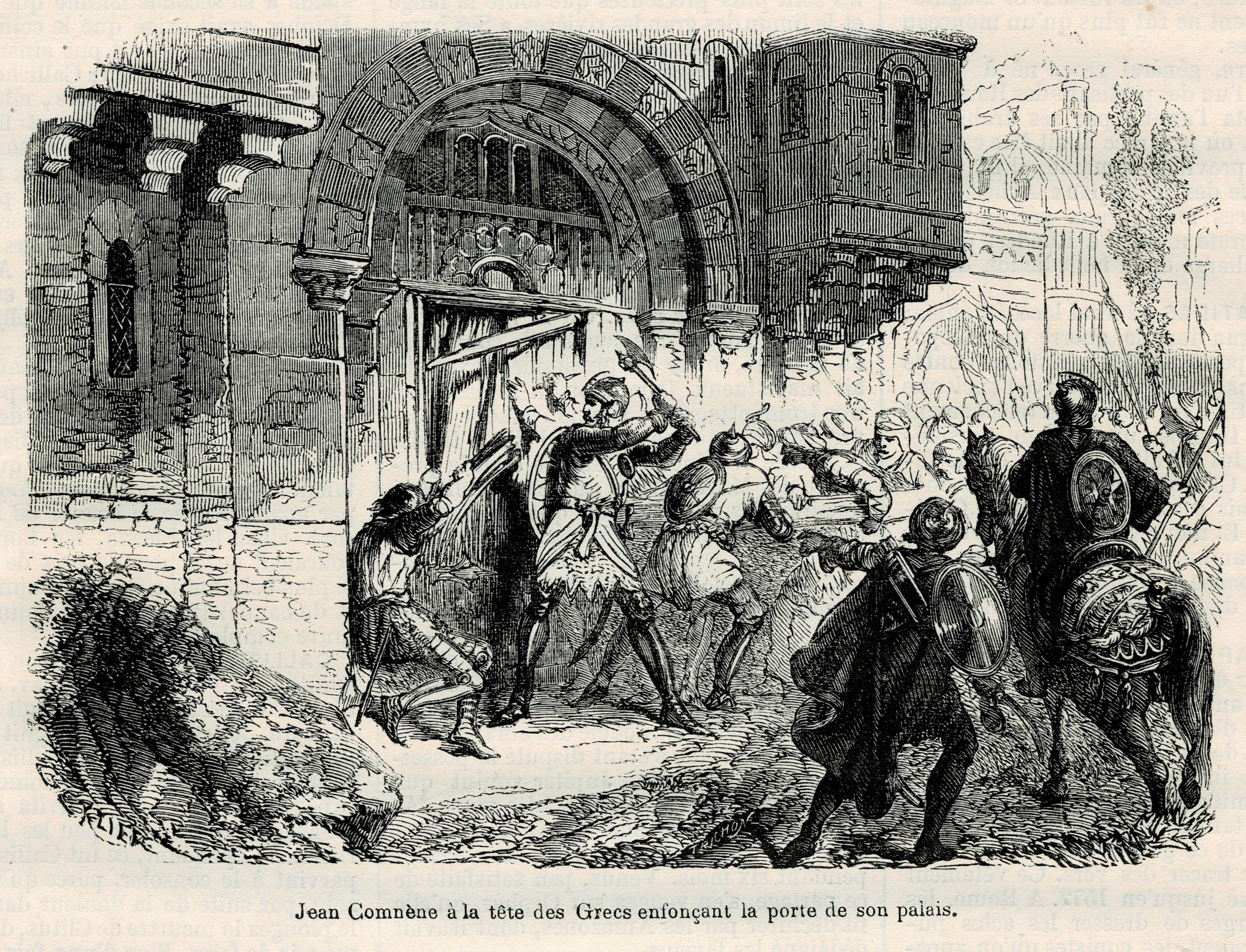
- A French illustration depicting John Komnenos "the Fat" leading his Greek supporters destroying the doors of his palace.
- Usurpation: 31 July 1201 (or 1200)
- Died: 31 July 1201 (or 1200)
- Father: Alexios Axouch
- Mother: Maria Komnene

John Komnenos (Latinized as Comnenus), nicknamed "the Fat" (Greek: Ἰωάννης Κομνηνὸς ὁ παχύς, romanized: Ioannis Komninos o pahys), was a Byzantine noble who attempted to usurp the imperial throne from Alexios III Angelos in a short-lived coup in Constantinople on 31 July 1201 (or 1200). The coup drew on opposition to the ruling Angelid dynasty among rival aristocratic families and the common people, who were dissatisfied by the dynasty's failures against external foes. John had previously been an obscure figure, but he became the figurehead of the uprising because of his imperial blood, as he was descended from the illustrious Komnenian dynasty (1081–1185). However, the real driving force behind his coup was probably the ambitious Alexios Doukas Mourtzouphlos. With the support of the capital's populace, the plotters managed to seize most of the Great Palace in Constantinople's southeastern corner, which the mob proceeded to loot, and John Komnenos was crowned in the Hagia Sophia. Alexios III, however, was secure in his residence in the northwestern Palace of Blachernae, and he sent forces by sea to land in the part of the Great Palace still held by the loyal Varangian Guard. Most of the urban mob dispersed for the night, and the Varangians had little difficulty in suppressing the coup. John Komnenos was captured and executed with many of his followers.

== Origin and political background ==
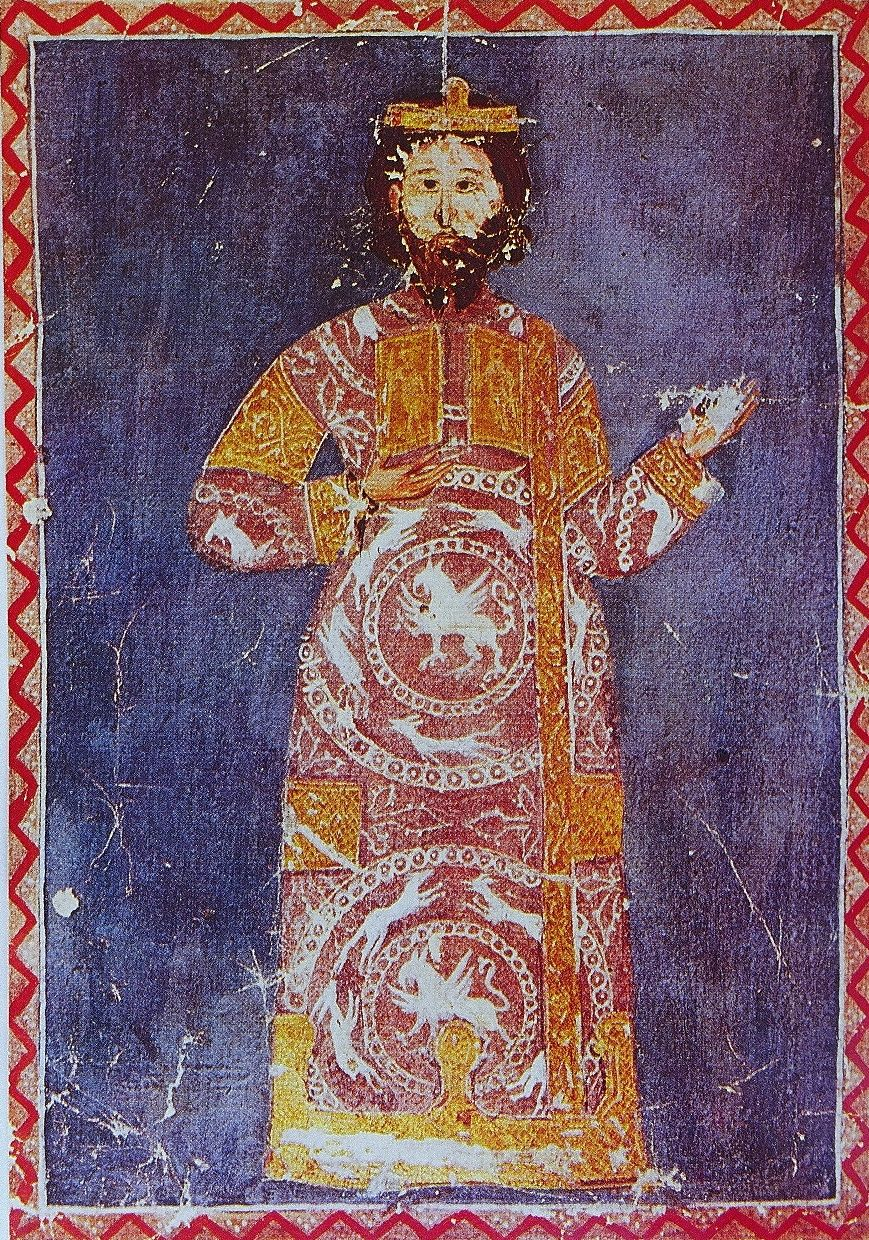
Alexios Doukas Mourtzouphlos, the probable mastermind behind John Komnenos' coup

John was ultimately of Greek and Turkish ancestry descending from both the Komnenoi and the Axouch. His father was the distinguished protostrator Alexios Axouch. The Axouchoi were a family of Turkish origin closely associated with the Komnenian dynasty and provided a number of distinguished generals. The two families also intermarried: John's mother Maria was the daughter of Alexios Komnenos, eldest son and co-emperor of Emperor John II Komnenos (r. 1118–1143). John was thus able to claim a pedigree comparable, if not superior, to the reigning Angeloi, albeit from the maternal side.

The reign of Alexios III Angelos (r. 1195–1203) had been troubled from the outset: the aristocracy conspired against him, his pressing demand for new sources of revenue was blocked by the refusal of Senate, clergy and merchants to contribute, while the lower and middle classes of the imperial capital frequently displayed their discontent with riots against corrupt officials. The most notable of these was a large-scale uprising in February 1200 against the warden of the praetorium, Constantinople's chief prison, John Lagos, which was bloodily suppressed by imperial troops.

John Komnenos was a rather unimportant figure in the court, and in a marginal note dating to the late 13th century, Alexios Doukas Mourtzouphlos, who briefly became emperor during Constantinople's final siege by the Fourth Crusade, was named as the real mastermind behind the coup. He was certainly supported by a wider circle of nobles from the Komnenian era, possibly even the brothers Alexios Komnenos and David Komnenos, who later founded the Empire of Trebizond (1204–1461). Thus the historian Michael Angold traces the coup's inception to the events of early 1199, when Alexios III married his two daughters Irene and Anna to the young noblemen Alexios Palaiologos and Theodore Laskaris respectively. This marriage not only spoke of increasing confidence for the Emperor, but also provided for the imperial succession and began the establishment of a separate aristocratic power-base, which must have displeased many noble families.

However, the revolt was also fuelled by a general feeling of discontent and humiliation at the failures of the Angeloi, especially in terms of foreign policy. This much is evident from the — albeit embellished — account of the eyewitness Nicholas Mesarites, whereby John Komnenos's supporters proclaimed that henceforth everything would go well for Romania, that her enemies would be vanquished, and that the kings of all the earth would come to pay homage to Constantinople.

== Coup ==
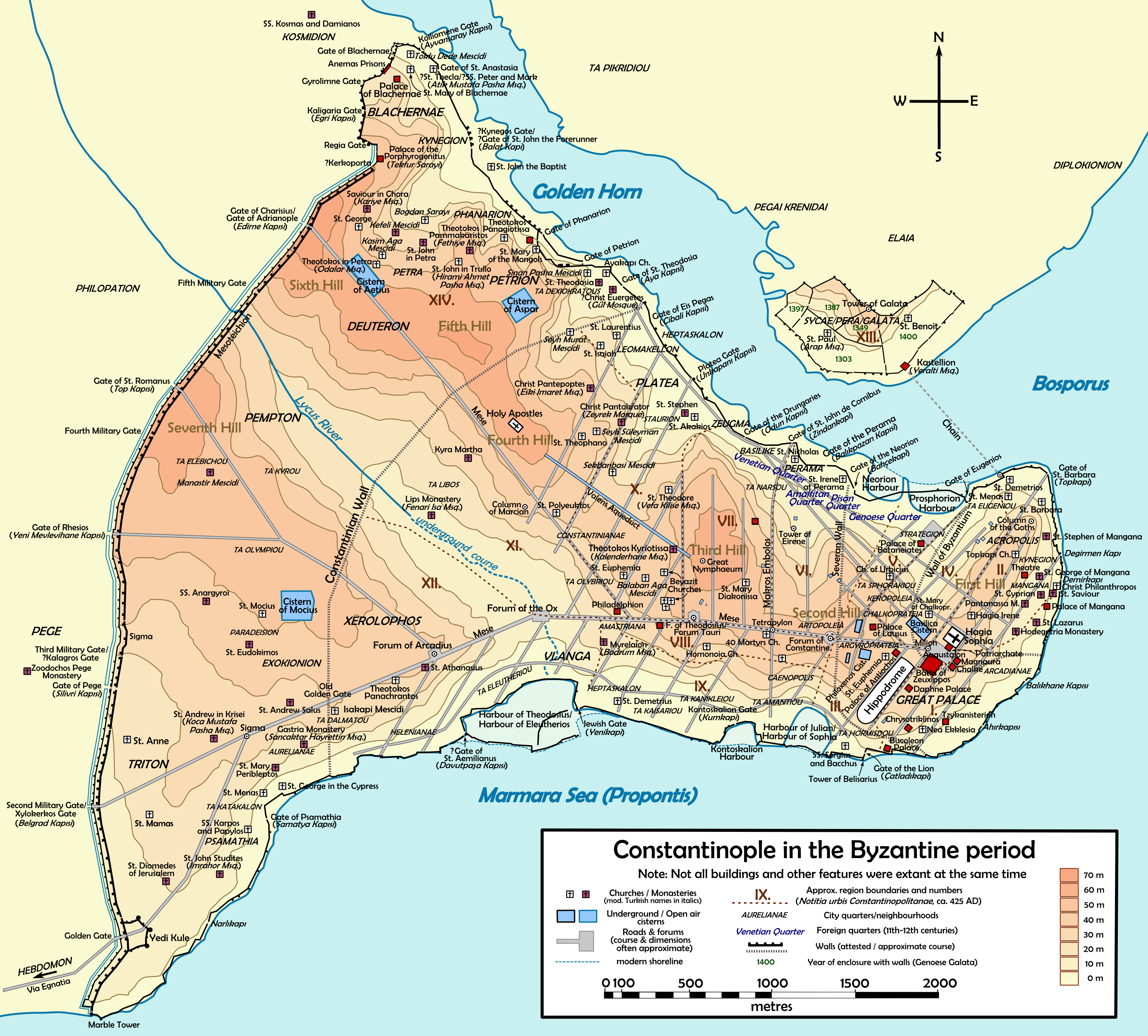
Map of Byzantine Constantinople

John's coup was launched on 31 July 1201, when the conspirators broke into the Hagia Sophia, where they swore to restore the Empire to its ancient bounds against the Vlach-Bulgarians, Turks and the Latins. While John was being proclaimed emperor and crowned by a monk—Patriarch John X Kamateros had hidden himself inside a cupboard—the capital's populace rioted outside and set fire to a number of churches. The conspirators then marched towards the Great Palace, the ancient seat of the Byzantine emperors. Avoiding the Chalke Gate, which was held by the feared Varangian Guard, they made for the imperial box in the Hippodrome, the kathisma, which was connected to the palace precinct. John's supporters indeed managed to drive off the Macedonian guard placed there and entered the palace through the Kareia Gate.

Having gained control of the western portions of the palace, John sat on the imperial throne, which broke under his great weight. He took no further actions to consolidate his position, other than appoint his chief followers to the Empire's highest posts. At the same time, his supporters, who along with the urban mob included a sizeable group of Georgian and Italian mercenaries, began to loot the buildings. They even reached the Nea Ekklesia and the Church of the Virgin of the Pharos, the Empire's chief depository of holy relics, which was defended by its skeuophylax, Nicholas Mesarites, with a small guard provided by John Komnenos. Mesarites and his men managed to drive the looters back, until he was wounded in the skirmish and withdrew to the Pharos Church.

With the coming of night, most of the crowd that had accompanied the storming of the palace earlier that day departed, intending to resume looting the next day. In the meantime, Alexios III, who resided in the Blachernae Palace in the city's northwestern corner, rallied for a counter-strike. A small force was dispatched with boats around the city's peninsula to the Hodegetria Monastery north of the Great Palace. It was led by the emperor's son-in-law Alexios Palaiologos, who at that point was likely regarded as his heir-apparent, and quickly made contact with the Varangians who had held out in the palace's northern parts, around the Chalke Gate.

The loyalist force marched to the Hippodrome, where they drove away most of John's supporters. They then entered the palace, where they found scarce opposition from John's attendants. John was captured after a short chase in the palace, and his head was immediately cut off, to be displayed the next morning at the Forum of Constantine, while his body was displayed at Blachernae. A similar fate befell many of his supporters that night, while others were captured and tortured to extract the names of all the conspirators. Alexios Mourtzouphlos was likely put in prison for his role in this affair (he is known to have been in prison in 1203), and the two Komnenos brothers, Alexios and David, seem to have fled the capital immediately after the coup's failure.

== Historiography ==
John's coup was written extensively about by contemporaries: the historian Niketas Choniates deals with it briefly and rather dismissively, but Nicholas Mesarites left a long eyewitness account of events, in which his own role is suitably emphasized. The scholars Nikephoros Chrysoberges and Euthymios Tornikes wrote speeches in celebration of the coup's failure.

== Family ==
Some modern genealogical researchers consider John a possible father to Theodora Axouchina, wife of Emperor Alexios I Megas Komnenos of Trebizond (r. 1204–1222), but that is conjectural: the family name Axouchina is ascribed to her because her eldest son, the Trebizondian emperor John I Megas Komnenos Axouchos (r. 1235–1238), bore it as well.

== See also ==
- List of shortest-reigning monarchs

== Sources ==
- Angold, Michael (2005), "Byzantine politics vis-à-vis the Fourth Crusade", in Laiou, Angeliki E. (ed.), Urbs capta: the Fourth Crusade and its consequences, Paris: Lethielleux, pp. 55–68, ISBN 2-283-60464-8, ISSN 1147-4963
- Brand, Charles M. (1968). Byzantium Confronts the West, 1180–1204. Cambridge, Massachusetts: Harvard University Press. LCCN 67-20872.
- Cheynet, Jean-Claude (1996), Pouvoir et contestations à Byzance (963–1210) (in French), Paris: Publications de la Sorbonne, ISBN 978-2-85944-168-5
- Kazhdan, Alexander, ed. (1991). The Oxford Dictionary of Byzantium. Oxford and New York: Oxford University Press. ISBN 0-19-504652-8.
- Williams, Kelsey Jackson (2007), "A Genealogy of the Grand Komnenoi of Trebizond", Foundations: The Journal of the Foundation for Mediaeval Genealogy, 2 (3), Chobham: Foundation for Medieval Genealogy, ISSN 1479-5078
