= Borghild Olavsdotter =

Mistress of Sigurd the Crusader

Borghild Olavsdatter (fl. 1115), was the Norwegian royal mistress of King Sigurd the Crusader (c. 1090 – 1130) and the mother of King Magnus IV of Norway (ca. 1115 – 1139). She probably lived within the period 1090 to 1150 and was one of few Christian women mentioned in Heimskringla by Snorre Sturlasson.

Borghild was the daughter of a wealthy farmer who owned the farm Stordal (Store-Dal i Skjeberg) in the parish of Skjeberg in Østfold.

One winter, King Sigurd spent a period as a guest of her father. The close friendship which developed between Borghild and Sigurd gave rise to rumours that they were lovers. Borghild regarded these rumours as offensive, and voluntarily demanded to perform a trial by ordeal to prove that they were slander. She successfully did so. When King Sigurd heard of this ordeal, he took Borghild for his concubine and brought her away with him.

== Other sources ==
- Gadd, Pia (2009) Frillor, fruar och herrar - en okänd kvinnohistoria (Mistresses, wives and masters - an unknown history of women) (Förlag Fischer Co) ISBN 9789185183654
