= Ingeborg of Kiev =

Ruthenian princess (fl. 1137)

- Spouse: Canute Lavard
- Issue: Princess Margaret; Christine, Queen of Norway; Princess Catherine; Valdemar I of Denmark
- House: Monomakhovichi (by birth); Estridsen (by marriage)
- Father: Mstislav I of Kiev
- Mother: Christina Ingesdotter of Sweden

Ingeborg Mstislavna of Kiev (fl. 1137) was a Ruthenian princess, married to the Danish prince Canute Lavard of Jutland.

She was the daughter of Grand Prince Mstislav I of Kiev and Christina Ingesdotter of Sweden and was in about 1117 married to Canute in a marriage arranged by her maternal aunt, the Danish queen Margaret Fredkulla. In 1130, she tried to prevent Canute from going to the gathering where he was to be murdered, but without success.

She gave birth to their son, Valdemar I of Denmark, in January 1131, after her husband's death. In 1137, she refused to support the suggestion of Christiern Svendsen to proclaim her son monarch after the death of her late husband's half-brother Erik Emune. Ingeborg is not mentioned after this, and the date of her birth and death are unknown.

== Issue ==
Ingeborg married Canute Lavard, son of King Eric I of Denmark. They had four children:

- Margaret, married Danish nobleman Stig Tokesen Hvitaledr (died 1150) of the Hvide family from Scania (then a Danish province) and had Christina Hvide
- Christina (b. 1118), married (1133) Magnus IV of Norway
- Catherine, married Pribislav of Mecklenburg, son of Niklot, prince of Obotrites
- Valdemar I of Denmark (born 1131)
