= 2023 European Youth Orienteering Championships =

- Location: Velingrad, Bulgaria
- Dates: 22-25 June 2023
- Nations: 32

The 2023 European Youth Orienteering Championships was an edition of the European U16 and U18 Orientering Championships, organised by the International Orienteering Federation. It was held in Velingrad, Bulgaria from June 22-25, 2023.

== Medal overview ==
=== Men ===
Event	Gold	Silver	Bronze
U18
Sprint	(Hungary) Tamas Felfoldi	(Slovakia) Filip Jancik	(Switzerland) Gratian Boehi
Long distance	(Czech Republic) Tomas Kucera	(Sweden) Ludwig Rosen	(Germany) Loic Dequiedt
Relay	Norway; Sondre Olaussen; Kristoffer Strom Wik; Nils Anders Niklasso	Switzerland; Loic Berger; Leander Wylenmann; Lukas Gasser	Sweden; Odin Ek; Svante Selin; Ludwig Rosen
U16
Sprint	(Finland) Aapo Virkajarvi	(Finland) Rasmus Toyryla	(Czech Republic) Jan Vanicek
Long distance	(Finland) Aapo Virkajarvi	(Spain) Aratz Beobide	(Czech Republic) Erik Heczko
Relay	Czech Republic; Vladimir Srb; Prokop Tomasek; Erik Heczko	Switzerland; Lavio Mueller; Andrin Meier; Andri Gujan	Poland; Stanislaw Drapella; Filip Wodzicki; Tomasz Rzenca

=== Women ===
Event	Gold	Silver	Bronze
U18
Sprint	(Hungary) Rita Maramarosi	(Finland) Eeva Liina Ojanaho	(Finland) Elli Punto
Long distance	(Finland) Eeva Liina Ojanaho	(Hungary) Rita Maramarosi	(Finland) Virna Pellikka
Relay	Finland; Virna Pellikka; Elli Punto; Eeva Liina Ojanaho	Czech Republic; Michaela Novotna; Katerina Stepova; Lea Martanova	Hungary; Bodza Virag Gerzsenyi; Janka Mikes; Rita Maramarosi
U16
Sprint	(Switzerland) Rahel Good	(Switzerland) Nesa Schiller	(Italy) Silvia Di Stefano
Long distance	(France) Fanny Delahaye	(Switzerland) Lotta Marit Luethi	(Czech Republic) Hana Vitkova
Relay	Finland; Lotta Laakso; Roosa Muukkonen; Ida Koskinen	Switzerland; Rahel Good; Lotta Marit Luethi; Luisa Gartmanná	Poland; Julia Biskupska; Jasmina Olejnik; Antonina Slonska

=== Medal table ===
* Host nation (Bulgaria)

Rank	Nation	Gold	Silver	Bronze	Total
1	Finland (FIN)	5	2	2	9
2	Czech Republic (CZE)	2	1	3	6
3	Hungary (HUN)	2	1	1	4
4	Switzerland (SWI)	1	5	1	7
5	France (FRA)	1	0	0	1
5	Norway (NOR)	1	0	0	1
7	Sweden (SWE)	0	1	1	2
8	Slovakia (SVK)	0	1	0	1
8	Spain (ESP)	0	1	0	1
10	Poland (POL)	0	0	2	2
11	Germany (GER)	0	0	1	1
11	Italy (ITA)	0	0	1	1
Totals (12 entries)		12	12	12	36
