= Ragna Nikolasdatter =

12th-century Queen of Norway

Queen consort of Norway
- Tenure: 114?–1157
- Died: after 3 February 1161
- Spouse: Øystein Haraldsson
- Father: Nikolas Måse

Ragna Nikolasdatter (fl. 1140s – 1161) was the queen consort of King Eystein II of Norway (Øystein Haraldsson).

== Biography ==
Ragna Nikolasdatter was the daughter of Nikolas Måse from Steig in what is now Sør-Fron Municipality in Gudbrandsdalen. Her marriage to King Eystein was probably made a few years after he arrived in Norway during 1142. The saga does not mention any children in connection with their marriage. Ragna was widowed when King Eystein was captured and killed by troops of his half-brother King Inge I of Norway during the summer 1157, somewhere in the area of present-day Bohuslän.

Three years later in 1160, Ragna was betrothed this time with King Inge's half-brother, Orm Ivarsson, who would later become a prominent leader during the reign of King Magnus V of Norway. The wedding was scheduled to take place during February 1161, but a battle began between the forces of King Inge and King Haakon II of Norway in Bjørvika. King Inge was defeated and killed leading his men into battle on 3 February 1161. Nothing more is said in the sources of Ragna.

Queen Ragna Nikolasdatter, alongside Ingebjørg Guttormsdatter and Estrid Bjørnsdotter, was one of the two acknowledged queen consorts in Norway between the mid 11th century to the 13th century not to have been foreign princesses.

Royal titles
Preceded by Ingrid Ragnvaldsdotter; 1134–1136	Queen Consort of Norway; 114?–1157	Succeeded by Estrid Bjørnsdotter; 1170–1176
