= Alexios Axouch =

12th-century Byzantine military leader

- Born: c. 12th century Byzantine Empire
- Died: c. Late 12th century
- Other names: Alexios Axouchos, Axuch
- Occupations: Nobleman, Military Leader
- Known for: Protostrator, military campaigns under Manuel I Komnenos, involvement in Byzantine-Sicilian relations
- Spouse: Maria Komnene
- Children: John Komnenos "the Fat"; Another son
- Parent: John Axouch

Alexios Axouch or Axouchos, sometimes found as Axuch (Greek: Ἀλέξιος Ἀξούχ, Ἀξοῦχος, romanized: Alexios Axouch, Axouchos), was a 12th-century Byzantine nobleman and military leader of mixed Seljuk and Byzantine ancestry.

== Biography ==
Alexios Axouch was the son of John Axouch, the megas domestikos (chief commander) of the Byzantine army, boyhood friend and "right-hand man" of Emperor John II Komnenos (r. 1118–1143). Alexios himself married Maria Komnene, the daughter of John II's eldest son and co-emperor Alexios, who died in 1142.

An experienced soldier, Alexios was awarded the rank of protostrator and participated in several military campaigns during the middle reign of Emperor Manuel I Komnenos (r. 1143–1180). He was sent to southern Italy in 1157, in an effort to retrieve the Byzantine position there following the defeat of megas doux Alexios Komnenos. Despite having at the same time to manage the delicate relations, fraught with mutual suspicion, with the Holy Roman Empire, which dominated northern Italy, Axouch was apparently very successful in his mission, leading to the conclusion of an honourable peace with King William I of Sicily in 1158 that allowed the Byzantine army to extricate itself from the Italian adventure. This allowed Manuel to focus his attention on the East, where his policies in Cilicia against the Armenian lord Thoros had failed spectacularly. In 1165, Alexios himself was sent to Cilicia as commander-in-chief (strategos autokrator) and governor (doux) during the captivity of Constantine Kalamanos. He possibly also participated in the war with Hungary in 1166 alongside the future Béla III of Hungary.

In c. 1167/70, however, he fell out of favour with Manuel after being charged with conspiring against him and having previously been criticized for a peculiar act of lèse majesté: he had decorated one of his palaces in Constantinople with magnificent pictures of the campaigns and victories of Kilij Arslan II (r. 1156–1192), the Seljuk Sultan of Iconium, and not, as was customary, with the exploits of Manuel himself. Modern scholarship considers this accusation unlikely. In addition, among other things, Alexios was also accused of "dabbling in sorcery" and conspiring with a Latin "wizard" to drug the Empress Maria of Antioch to prevent her from giving birth to an heir. The historian John Kinnamos maintained that the charges of conspiracy were genuine, but Niketas Choniates believed that Axouch had been set up by the insecure Manuel. In particular, Choniates reports that Manuel suspected both Axouch and his cousin, the future Andronikos I Komnenos (r. 1183–1185), because of the AIMA prophecy, that stated that his successor's name would begin with an "A". Whatever the truth, Alexios was found guilty and confined to a monastery for the rest of his days, despite his wife's repeated efforts to secure his release by Manuel. Maria reportedly died from her sorrow over her husband's fate, while Alexios himself also dying a few years after his tonsure.

Alexios Axouch had two sons, one of whom, John Komnenos "the Fat", led an abortive revolt against Emperor Alexios III Angelos (r. 1195–1203) in July 1201, and was killed during it.

== See also ==
- John Axouch
- John Komnenos the Fat
- John I of Trebizond

== Sources ==
- Garland, Lynda; Stone, Andrew (2006). "Mary of Antioch". De Imperatoribus Romanis: An Online Encyclopedia of Roman Rulers and Their Families. Archived from the original on 1 March 2006.
- Guilland, Rodolphe (1967). "Le Protostrator". Recherches sur les institutions byzantines, Tome I (in French). Berlin: Akademie-Verlag. pp. 478–497.
- Kazhdan, Alexander, ed. (1991). The Oxford Dictionary of Byzantium. Oxford and New York: Oxford University Press. ISBN 0-19-504652-8.
- Magdalino, Paul (2002) [1993]. The Empire of Manuel I Komnenos, 1143–1180 (Second ed.). Cambridge: Cambridge University Press. ISBN 9780521526531.
