= Dobrodeia of Kiev =

Empress consort of the Byzantine Empire

- Basilissa
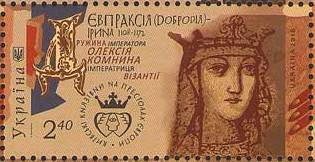
- Dobrodeia-Eupraxia on a 2016 Ukrainian stamp

Empress of the Byzantine Empire
- Tenure: c. 1122–1131
- Born: c. 1108; Kiev, Kievan Rus'
- Died: 16 November 1131
- Spouse: Alexios Komnenos
- House: Monomakhovichi
- Father: Mstislav I of Kiev
- Mother: Christina Ingesdotter of Sweden

Dobrodeia Mstislavna of Kiev (Cyrillic: Добродея Мстиславна; baptized Eupraxia [Εὐπραξία] or Irene [Εἰρήνη]; died 16 November 1131) was a Byzantine empress by marriage to co-emperor Alexios Komnenos. She was also an author on medicine.

== Life ==
Born in Kiev in the early years of the 12th century, Dobrodeia was the daughter of Mstislav I of Kiev and Christina Ingesdotter of Sweden. In or shortly after 1122, she married Alexios Komnenos, the eldest son and co-emperor of Byzantine emperor John II Komnenos (r. 1118–1143). She received the title of empress (basilissa), and the Christian name "Irene", after her mother-in-law, Empress Irene of Hungary (other sources give her Christian name as "Eupraxia"). She and Alexios had one daughter, Maria, who was born c. 1125.

In the imperial court of Constantinople, she became a part of a circle of women intellectuals, notably Alexios' aunt Anna Comnena, and the noblewoman Irene, known as a patron of astrologers and scholars. She was encouraged to find her own scholarly interest, studied extensively and was described by contemporaries: "She was not born in Athens, but she learned all the wisdom of the Greeks". The writer Theodore Balsamon noted that she "displayed a fascination with healing methods" and that she formulated medical salves and described their efficiency in a treatise on entitled "Ointments" (Greek "Alimma"), which is regarded as the first treatise on medicine written by a woman. Fragments of this work are kept in the Medici Library in Florence. She studied the ancient physician Galen, and translated some of his works into Old East Slavic.

She died, of unknown causes, on 16 November 1131. Following her death, Alexios Komnenos is believed to have married his next spouse Kata of Georgia.

== See also ==
- Timeline of women in science

== Sources ==
- Pushkareva, Natalia (1997). Women in Russian History: From the Tenth to the Twentieth Century. Translated by Eve Levin. New York and London: M.E. Sharpe. ISBN 1-56324-797-6.
- Varzos, Konstantinos (1984). Η Γενεαλογία των Κομνηνών [The Genealogy of the Komnenoi] (PDF) (in Greek). Vol. A1. Thessaloniki: Centre for Byzantine Studies, University of Thessaloniki.
