= 2026 European Youth Orienteering Championships =

- Location: Nova Gorica, Slovenia
- Dates: 25-27 June 2026

The 2026 European Youth Orienteering Championships was an edition of the European U16 and U18 Orientering Championships, organised by the International Orienteering Federation. It was held in Nova Gorica, Slovenia from June 25-27, 2026.

== Medal overview ==
=== Men ===
Event	Gold	Silver	Bronze
U18
Sprint	(Spain) Ekain Fernandez Garcia	(Czech Republic) Martin Bulicka	(Finland) Vilho Hietala
Long distance	(Czech Republic) Martin Bulicka	(Czech Republic) Matous Skripnik	(Germany) Julian Doetsch
Relay	Finland; Vilho Hietala; Joakim Savinainen; Veeti Viippola	Czech Republic; Matous Skripnik; Matej Cecka; Martin Bulicka	France; Titouan Andrieux; Tom Lemercier; Emmanuel Pradeau
U16
Sprint	(Spain) Daniel Sanz	(Poland) Antoni Pachnik	(Finland) Kasper Ekonoja
Long distance	(Finland) Aapo Virkajarvi	(Spain) Aratz Beobide	(Czech Republic) Erik Heczko
Relay	Czech Republic; Frantisek Minarik; Jakub Ritter; Matous Dittrich	Finland; Hermanni Latonummi; Daniel Stenholm; Aapo Talka	Spain; Bruno Fuente Feijoo; Carlit Tolkko Valledor; Daniel Sanz

=== Women ===
Event	Gold	Silver	Bronze
U18
Sprint	(Switzerland) Lotta Marit Luethi	(Sweden) Elsa Ehrenborg	(Switzerland) Lenia Grimm
Long distance	(Slovenia) Brina Kolner	(Hungary) Sara Szakal Biro	(Czech Republic) Tereza Ester Kamenicka
Relay	Czech Republic; Karolina Novotna; Matilda Tomaskova; Tereza Ester Kamenicka	Sweden; Maja Maxen; Elsa Ehrenborg; Elvira Lindsten	Hungary; Zsofia Gabor; Aliz Heizer; Sara Szakal Biro
U16
Sprint	(Croatia) Dora Delic	(Finland) Hilda Damskagg	(Finland) Saana Turpeinen
Long distance	(Croatia) Sara Delic	(Czech Republic) Monika Munzarova	(Czech Republic) Hana Fenclova
Relay	Croatia; Helena Posedi; Sara Delic; Dora Delic	Czech Republic; Hana Fenclova; Adela Dobyasova; Monika Munzarova	Latvia; Madlena Freimane; Amanta Mikijanska; Melanija Rozukalne

=== Medals table ===
* Host nation (Slovenia)

Rank	Nation	Gold	Silver	Bronze	Total
1	Czech Republic (CZE)	3	5	3	11
2	Croatia (CRO)	3	0	0	3
3	Finland (FIN)	2	2	3	7
4	Spain (ESP)	2	1	1	4
5	Switzerland (SUI)	1	0	1	2
6	Slovenia (SLO)	1	0	0	1
7	Sweden (SWE)	0	2	0	2
8	Hungary (HUN)	0	1	1	2
9	Poland (POL)	0	1	0	1
10	France (FRA)	0	0	1	1
10	Germany (GER)	0	0	1	1
10	Latvia (LAT)	0	0	1	1
Totals (12 entries)		12	12	12	36
