= Vladimir III of Kiev =

Grand Prince of Kiev in 1171

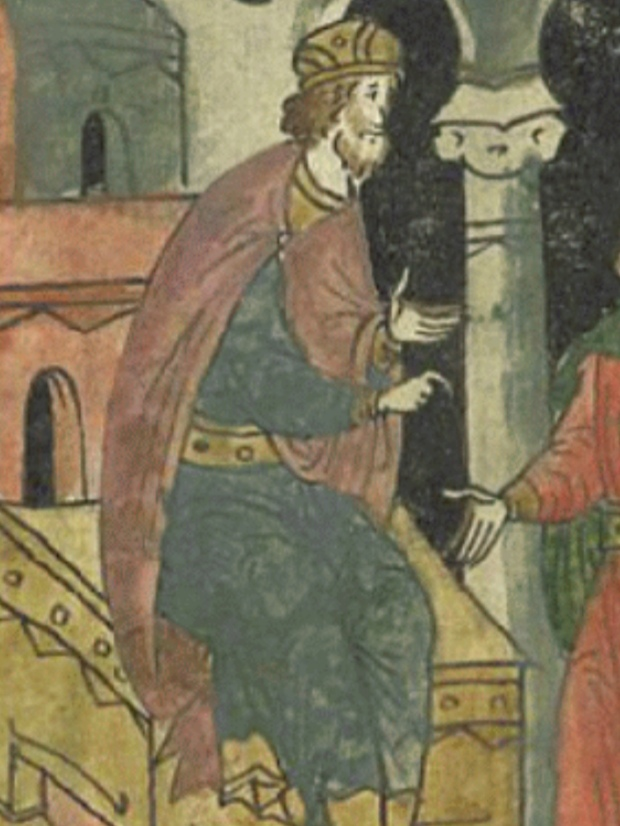
Vladimir III in a miniature from the Illustrated Chronicle of Ivan the Terrible, 16th century

Vladimir III Mstislavich (Note: Russian: Владимир III Мстиславич; Ukrainian: Володимир III Мстиславич) (1132–1171) was a prince of Dorogobuzh (1150–1154; 1170–1171), Vladimir and Volyn (1154–1157), Slutsk (1162), Trypillia (1162–1168) and Grand Prince of Kiev (1171). He was the son of Mstislav I Vladimirovich. Vladimir was the grandson of Vladimir Monomakh.

== Biography ==
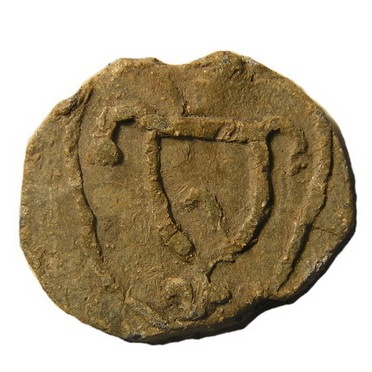
Seal of Vladimir III Mstislavich

Due to his brief rule, he is omitted from some lists of the princes of Kiev. The chronology provided in the Hypatian and Khlebnikov copies of the Kievan Chronicle show various errors, and also contradict each other. According to historian Leonid Makhnovets (1989), his reign should be dated from 5 February to 10 May 1171, three months and a few days, even though the text says "four months" (because incomplete periods of time were customarily rounded up).

== Private life ==
Vladimir was a son of Mstislav I from his second marriage with Liubava Dmitrievna Zavidich. (Note: According to Philip Line, Vladimir's mother was Christina Ingesdotter of Sweden.) According to Latopis kijowski Vladimir was born between 1 March 1131 and 29 February 1132.

He kept excellent ties with Hungary and Serbia. In 1150 he married the daughter of Serbia's Beloš Vukanović. According to old Russian annals, her titular name was inscribed as "Banovna". They had four sons.

== Bibliography ==
- Line, Philip (2007). Kingship and State Formation in Sweden: 1130 - 1290. Brill.
- Makhnovets, Leonid (1989). Літопис Руський за Іпатським списком [Rus' Chronicle according to the Hypatian Codex] (in Ukrainian). Kyiv: Dnipro. p. 591. ISBN 5-308-00052-2.

Vladimir III Mstislavich Monomakhovichi Born: 1132 Died: 1171
Preceded by Gleb I	Grand Prince of Kiev; 1171	Succeeded by Michael I
