= 2021 European Youth Orienteering Championships =

International orienteering competition

- Location: Vilnius, Lithuania
- Dates: 19–22 August 2021
- Nations: 29

The 2021 European Youth Orienteering Championships was an edition of the European U16 and U18 Orientering Championships, organised by the International Orienteering Federation. It was held in Vilnius, Lithuania from 19–22 August 2021.

== Medal overview ==
=== Men ===
Event	Gold	Silver	Bronze
U18
Sprint	(Germany) Konrad Stamer	(Norway) Brage Takle	(France) Mathias Barros Vallet
Long distance	(Finland) Aarni Ronkainen	(Russia) Mark Tutynin	(Norway) Martin Vehus Skjerve
Relay	Norway; Alfred Bjørnerød; Brage Takle; Martin Vehus Skjerve	Czech Republic; Vít Čech; Lukáš Vítebský; Martin Šimša	Lithuania; Tadas Dementavičius; Adomas Časas; Andojas Lapinskas
U16
Sprint	(Czech Republic) Jan Strýček	(Denmark) Niels Dalgaard	(Czech Republic) Dan Bolehovský
Long distance	(Czech Republic) Dan Bolehovský	(Denmark) Hannes Mogensen	(Czech Republic) Jan Strýček
Relay	Denmark; Casper Blakskjær; Niels Dalgaard; Hannes Mogensen	Czech Republic; Jan Strýček; Jakub Račanský; Dan Bolehovský	Estonia; Chris Marcus Krahv; Ossi Rasmus Priks; Renno Merenäkk

=== Women ===
Event	Gold	Silver	Bronze
U18
Sprint	(Hungary) Viktória Mag	(Czech Republic) Markéta Mulíčková	(Finland) Salla Isoherranen
Long distance	(Finland) Salla Isoherranen	(Switzerland) Alina Niggli	(Hungary) Boglárka Czakó
Relay	Sweden; Elsa Sonesson; Ida Bengtsson; Hanna Jonsell	Finland; Emilia Tala; Inari Karppinen; Salla Isoherranen	Russia; Anastasiya Kurova; Kseniya Beskhmelnova; Olesia Gladilkina
U16
Sprint	(Hungary) Rita Máramarosi	(Finland) Silva Kemppi	(Czech Republic) Lea Martanová
Long distance	(Finland) Silva Kemppi	(Czech Republic) Michaela Metelková	(Finland) Elli Punto
Relay	Finland; Virna Pellikka; Elli Punto; Silva Kemppi	Czech Republic; Michaela Novotná; Michaela Metelková; Lea Martanová	Hungary; Lili Lantai; Janka Mikes; Rita Máramarosi

=== Medal table ===
* Host nation (Lithuania)

Rank	Nation	Gold	Silver	Bronze	Total
1	Finland (FIN)	4	2	2	8
2	Czech Republic (CZE)	2	5	3	10
3	Hungary (HUN)	2	0	2	4
4	Denmark (DEN)	1	2	0	3
5	Norway (NOR)	1	1	1	3
6	Germany (GER)	1	0	0	1
6	Sweden (SWE)	1	0	0	1
8	Russia (RUS)	0	1	1	2
9	Switzerland (SUI)	0	1	0	1
10	Estonia (EST)	0	0	1	1
10	France (FRA)	0	0	1	1
10	Lithuania (LTU)*	0	0	1	1
Totals (12 entries)		12	12	12	36

== Participating countries ==
29 countries participated.

- Austria
- Belarus
- Belgium
- Bulgaria
- Czech Republic
- Denmark
- Estonia
- Finland
- France
- Germany
- Hungary
- Ireland
- Israel
- Italy
- Latvia
- Lithuania
- Netherlands
- Norway
- Poland
- Portugal
- Romania
- Russia
- Slovakia
- Slovenia
- Spain
- Sweden
- Switzerland
- Turkey
- Ukraine
