= Battle of Fyrileiv =

1134 battle

- Part of the Civil war era in Norway
Date	9 August 1134
Location	Fyrileiv, now Färlev in Bohuslen
Result	Victory for Magnus Sigurdsson

Belligerents
Magnus Sigurdsson	Harald Gille

Strength
7,200 men	1,800 men

Casualties and losses
Unknown	Kristrød king's brother and vassal Ingemar Sveinsson from Ask killed together with approximately 60 hirdmen

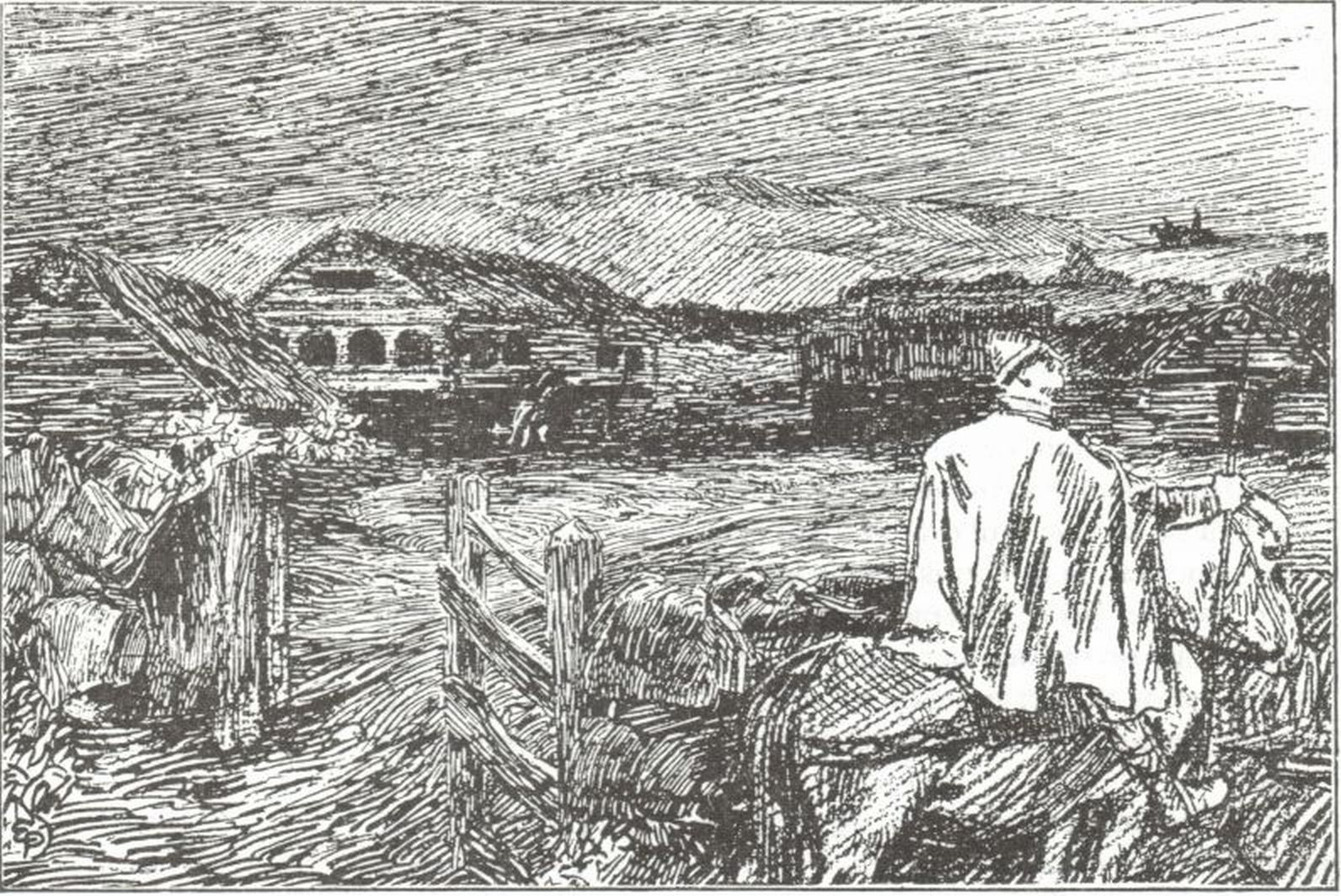
Harald Gilles' men kept watch around the farm. Drawn by Eilif Peterssen.

The Battle of Fyrileiv was the first battle in the Norwegian Civil War. It was fought between the co-kings Magnus Sigurdsson and Harald Gille at the farm Fyrileiv in Ranrike (now Färlev in Stågenäs lordship in Bohuslen) on 9 August 1134. The battle is mentioned in Magnus Blindes and Harald Gilles saga in Snorre's Heimskringla, and in Fagrskinna.

The battle ended with victory for Magnus and his men, who were clearly numerically superior.

== Background ==
The relationship between Magnus and his uncle Harald had long been bad. Harald Gille was born in Ireland and came to Norway as an adult because he had found out that he was the son of King Magnus Barefoot. Harald then sought out King Sigurd Jorsalfare and claimed that he was the king's brother. Sigurd recognized Harald as his brother after Harald had carried out the Iron Burden, but the agreement between them was that Harald should not claim the royal name as long as Sigurd and his son Magnus lived. Magnus was then a teenager and did not like this very much. He probably feared his position as future king. When Sigurd died in 1130, Harald allowed himself to be made king, and gained many supporters because of his generosity and good humor. Magnus, on the other hand, was regarded as both greedy and not nice.

The battle represented a final break between the two kings after the four years that had passed since the death of Magnus' father and Harald's brother, King Sigurd. In the summer, King Magnus summoned a large army and drew support from the nobles in large parts of the kingdom. Harald brought his men from Viken, among others, the squire Tjostolv Ålesson. He also brought his co-mother's half-brother, Kristrød. On 9 August, Harald and his men were at the farm Fyrileiv when his guards told them that Magnus was on his way with his army. According to Snorre, Harald did not, at first, believe that his nephew would fight him, but prepared his men for battle. It was blown to blows in a field close to the farm.

== The battle ==
It must have been a big and hard battle, and Magnus' men were outnumbered. 60 of Harald's courtiers fell, among them his brother Kristrød. Harald fled to Denmark, to King Erik Emune, to seek support there. After the battle, Magnus considered all of Norway his own, and he gave food to all of Harald's men who were wounded. Magnus's leading men thought they should wait in Viken in case Harald wanted to attack from the south, but Magnus instead let them all go home to their farms.

Snorri quotes from a quatrain by Halldor Skvalldre about the battle:

Fylking arms longer
got King Magnus there,
too many men followed him.
People fell there in droves.

== Sources ==
- Fagerskinna, oversatt av Edvard Eikill. Saga Bok, Stavanger 2005
- Snorre Sturlasson, Magnussønnenes saga, Magnus Blindes og Harald Gilles saga. I: Norges Kongesagaer, oversatt av Anne Holtsmark. Gyldedal, Oslo 1979
