= European Youth Orienteering Championships =

The European Youth Orienteering Championships (EYOC) are a competition in orienteering involving competitors either between 14 and 16 or 16 and 18 (M/W 16 and M/W 18).

The current championship events are:

- Long distance
- Relay – for three-person teams
- Sprint

== Editions ==
#	Year	Date	Place
1	2002	June 21–23	Gdynia, Poland
2	2003	June 19–22	Pezinok, Slovakia
3	2004	June 25–27	Salzburg, Austria
4	2005	June 23–26	Šumperk, Czech Republic
5	2006	June 29 – July 2	Škofja Loka, Slovenia
6	2007	June 22–24	Eger, Hungary
7	2008	October 10–12	Solothurn, Switzerland
8	2009	July 2–5	Kopaonik, Serbia
9	2010	July 1–4	Soria, Spain
10	2011	June 23–26	Jindřichův Hradec, Czech Republic
11	2012	June 28 – July 1	Bugeat, France
12	2013	October 24–27	Caldas da Rainha, Portugal
13	2014	June 25–28	(North Macedonia) Strumica, Macedonia
14	2015	June 25–28	Cluj-Napoca, Romania
15	2016	Jun 30 – Jul 3	Jarosław, Poland
16	2017	June 29 – July 7	Banská Bystrica, Slovakia
17	2018	June 28 – July 1	Veliko Tarnovo, Bulgaria
18	2019	June 27–30	Grodno, Belarus
-	~~2020~~	postponed until 2022	~~Salgótarján, Hungary~~
19	2021	August 19–22	Vilnius, Lithuania
20	2022	July 1–4	Salgótarján, Hungary
21	2023	June 22–25	Velingrad, Bulgaria
22	2024	June 21–24	Szczecin, Poland
23	2025	July 17-20	Brno, Czech Republic
24	2026	June 25-27	Nova Gorica, Slovenia
25	2027	June 25–28	Liepāja, Latvia
