= Christina of Denmark, Queen of Norway =

Queen of Norway from 1132 to 1133

Christina of Denmark

Queen consort of Norway
- Tenure: 1132-1133
- Born: c. 1118
- Died: 1139 (aged 20–21)
- Spouse: Magnus IV of Norway
Names
- Kristin Knutsdotter
- House: Estridsen
- Father: Canute Lavard
- Mother: Ingeborg of Kiev

Christina Knutsdatter of Denmark, in Norway known as Kristin Knutsdotter, (c. 1118 – 1139) was a Danish princess who became Queen of Norway as the spouse of King Magnus IV of Norway ("the Blind").

== Life ==
Christina was born to Canute Lavard and Ingeborg of Kiev. Her marriage to Magnus was arranged by her maternal aunt, Malmfred, former Queen of Norway and the former stepmother of Magnus, and at the time the wife of Christina's paternal uncle Eric. Christina was engaged in 1131, and the marriage took place in 1132/33.

King Magnus supported the struggle of her father Canute and uncle Eric against King Niels of Denmark. In 1133, Eric and Malmfrid fled Denmark for Norway and the protection of Magnus. After Queen Christina, however, found out that Magnus had plans to betray them, she warned them, and Eric and Malmfrid allied themselves with Magnus' rival, Harald IV of Norway. King Magnus then separated from Queen Christina.

Christina returned to Denmark, where the only remaining information about her is that she witnessed a document by king Eric Lam a couple of years later.

== Sources ==
- Alf Henrikson: Dansk historia (Danish history) (1989) (Swedish)
- Sven Rosborn (In Swedish): När hände vad i Nordens historia (When did what happen in the history of the Nordic countries) (1997)
- Edvard Bull. »Magnus Blinde» I: Norsk biografisk leksikon, 1. utg. Bd 9. 1938
- Nils Petter Thuesen. »Magnus 4 Sigurdsson Blinde» I: Norsk biografisk leksikon, 2. utg. Bd 6. 2003.
- Knut Helle. Aschehougs Norgeshistorie. Bd 3. Under kirke og kongemakt. 1995

Royal titles
Preceded by Malmfred	Queen consort of Norway; 1132–1133	Succeeded by Ingrid Ragnvaldsdotter
