= Canute Lavard =

Duke of Schleswig and Danish prince

Saint Canute Lavard
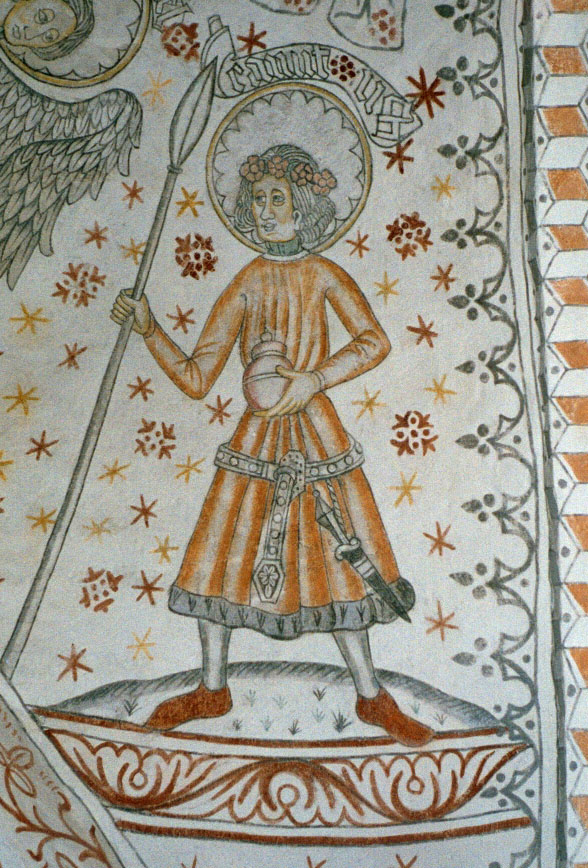
- Canute Lavard in a fresco in Vigersted Church near Ringsted

Martyr
- Born: 1096; Roskilde, Denmark
- Died: 7 January 1131 forest of Haraldsted near Ringsted in Zealand, Denmark
- Venerated in: Roman Catholic Church
- Canonized: 1169 by Pope Alexander III
- Feast: 7 January
- Attributes: knight with a wreath, lance, and ciborium
- Patronage: Zealand, Denmark
- Issue more...: Christina of Denmark; Valdemar I of Denmark

Saint Knud, also known as Canute Lavard (Danish: Knud Lavard; cognate with English Lord; 12 March 1096 – 7 January 1131) was a Danish prince. Later he was the first Duke of Schleswig and the first border prince who was both a Danish and a German vassal, a position leading towards the historical double position of Southern Jutland. He was killed by his cousin Magnus the Strong (c. 1106 – 1134), who saw him as a rival to the Danish throne. Canute Lavard was canonized in 1170.

He was an ancestor of the Valdemarian kings (Valdemarerne) and of their subsequent royal line. Canute Lavard was the father of King Valdemar I of Denmark (Valdemar den Store) and grandfather of King Valdemar II of Denmark (Valdemar Sejr).

== Biography ==
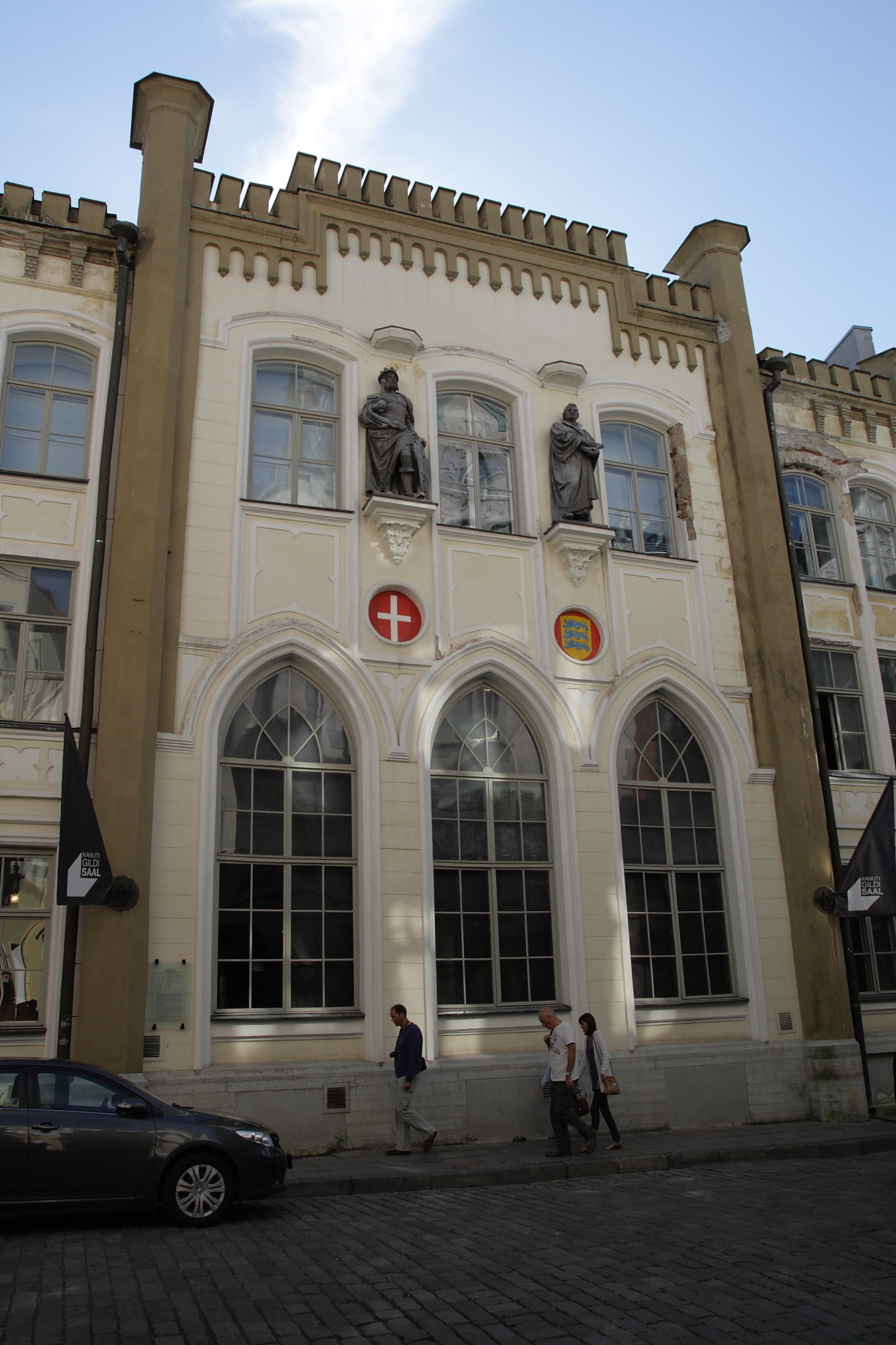
The house of the former Canute Guild in Tallinn, Estonia

Canute was the only legitimate son of King Eric I of Denmark (died 1103) and Boedil Thurgotsdatter, but as a minor he was bypassed in the election of 1104. He grew up in close contact with the noble family of Hvide, who were later on to be among his most eager supporters. In 1115, his uncle, King Niels of Denmark, placed him in charge of the Duchy of Schleswig (jarl af Sønderjylland) in order to put an end to the attacks of the Slavic Obotrites. During the next fifteen years, he fulfilled his duty of establishing peace in the border area so well that he was titled Duke of Holstein (Hertug af Holsten) and became a vassal of the Holy Roman Empire.

He seems to have been the first member of the Danish royal family who was attracted by the knightly ideals and habits of medieval Germany, indicated by his changing his title to Duke of Schleswig (Hertug af Slesvig). His appearance made him a popular man and a possible successor of his uncle, but he also acquired mighty enemies among the Danish princes and magnates, who apparently questioned his loyalty and feared his bond with Emperor Lothair III, who had recognized him as sovereign over the western Wends.

Both Niels and his son, Magnus the Strong, seem to have been alarmed at Canute's being recognized by the Emperor. On 7 January 1131, Canute was trapped in the Haraldsted Forest (Haraldsted Skov) near Ringsted in Zealand and murdered by Magnus. Ringsted Abbey, one of the earliest Benedictine houses in Denmark, became the initial resting place of Canute Lavard, which in 1157 were moved to a new chapel at St. Bendt's Church in Ringsted. During medieval times a chapel (Knud Lavards Kapel) was erected on the site where he died but it disappeared after the Reformation. The ruins were rediscovered in 1883. In 1902 a memorial in the form of a 4-metre crucifix was erected near the site of the death of Canute Lavard.

After the death of Canute Lavard, the Obotrite lands were partitioned between Pribislav and Niklot (1090–1160), both chiefs of the Obotrites. Some sources consider the death of Canute to be a murder committed by Magnus, while others attribute it to Niels himself. In any case. the death provoked a civil war that continued intermittently until 1157, ending only with the triumph of Canute's posthumous son Valdemar I. The fate of Canute and his son's victory formed the background for his canonisation in 1170, at the request of King Valdemar. His feast day (Knutsdagen) was originally celebrated on the day of his death, 7 January, but when the end of Christmas was moved to a week later in Sweden, Finland, and (parts of) Norway in the late 17th century, the feast day moved with it, and is now celebrated on 13 January.

The Canute Guild in Tallinn, Estonia was named in commemoration of Canute Lavard. The guild later gave its name to the "Canute Street" (Kanuti tänav) and to the "Canute Garden" (Kanuti aed) in the town.

== Issue ==
Canute Lavard married Ingeborg of Kiev, daughter of Mstislav I of Kiev and his wife Christina Ingesdotter of Sweden. They had four children:

1. Margaret, married Danish nobleman Stig Tokesen Hvitaledr (died 1150) of the Hvide family from Scania (then a Danish province) and had Christina Hvide
2. Christina (b. 1118), married (1133) Magnus IV of Norway
3. Catherine, married Pribislav of Mecklenburg, son of Niklot, prince of Obotrites
4. Valdemar I of Denmark (born 1131)

== See also ==
- Family tree of Danish monarchs

== Other sources ==
- Susanne Schurr (1992). "Knud Lavard, Jarl in Schleswig". In Bautz, Traugott (ed.). Biographisch-Bibliographisches Kirchenlexikon (BBKL) (in German). Vol. 4. Herzberg: Bautz. cols. 183–186. ISBN 3-88309-038-7.
- Attwater, Donald and Catherine Rachel John (1993) The Penguin Dictionary of Saints. 3rd edition. (New York: Penguin Books) ISBN 0-14-051312-4
- Mortensen, Lars Boje (2006) The Making of Christian Myths in the Periphery of Latin Christendom (Ca. 1000-1300) (Museum Tusculanum Press) ISBN 978-87-635-0407-2

Canute Lavard House of Estridsen Born: c. 1090 Died: 7 January 1131
Regnal titles
Vacant Title last held by Olaf	Earl/Duke in Southern Jutland titled there: Duke of Denmark; 1120–1131	Succeeded by Magnus Nielsen
