= Maria Mstislavna of Kiev =

Grand Princess consort of Kiev (died 1179)

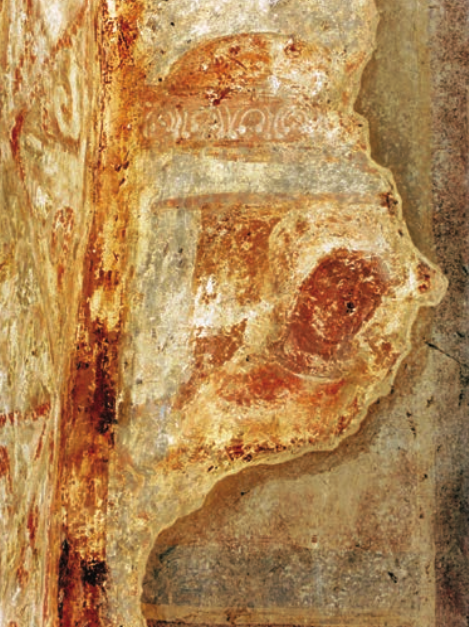
Fresco portrait of Mary, 12th century forties

Maria Mstislavna of Kiev (died 1179), was a Grand Princess consort of Kiev by marriage to Prince Vsevolod II of Kiev. She was the daughter of Mstislav I of Kiev and Christina Ingesdotter of Sweden.

Her marriage was arranged in 1116 to facilitate better relations between her father and spouse, who were long standing enemies. She is believed to have been much younger than her husband. During the reign of her spouse, she was known for her diplomatic ability, and often asked to mediate between her husband and brothers. She is believed to be one of the founders of St. Cyril's Monastery.

== Issue ==
1. Sviatoslav III of Kiev
2. Yaroslav II Vsevolodovich, born in 1139
3. Anna of Chernigov, married a prince of Halych, son of Vasylko Rostyslavych according to some chronicles
4. Zvenislava of Chernigov, married Boleslaw I the Tall, Duke of Wroclaw
