= Christina Ingesdotter =

Princess consort of Veliky Novgorod, Rostov and Belgorod (d. 1122)

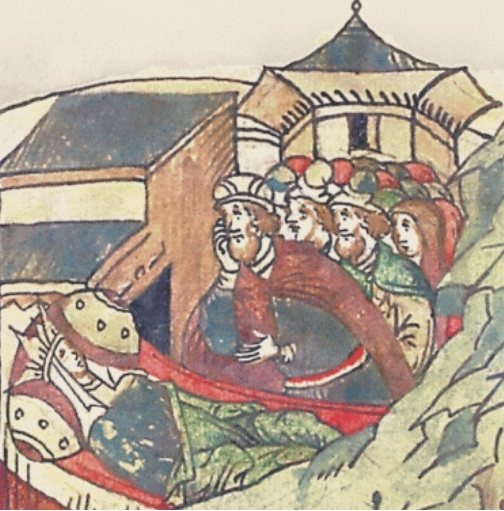
- 16th century miniature of Christina on her deathbed (detail)
- Born: 11th century
- Died: 18 January 1122
- Spouse: Mstislav I of Kiev
- Issue Among others...: Ingeborg of Kiev; Malmfred, Queen of Norway and Denmark; Eupraxia; Vsevolod of Novgorod and Pskov; Maria Mstislavna of Kiev; Iziaslav II of Kiev; Rostislav I of Kiev
- House: Stenkil
- Father: Inge the Elder
- Mother: Helena, Queen of Sweden

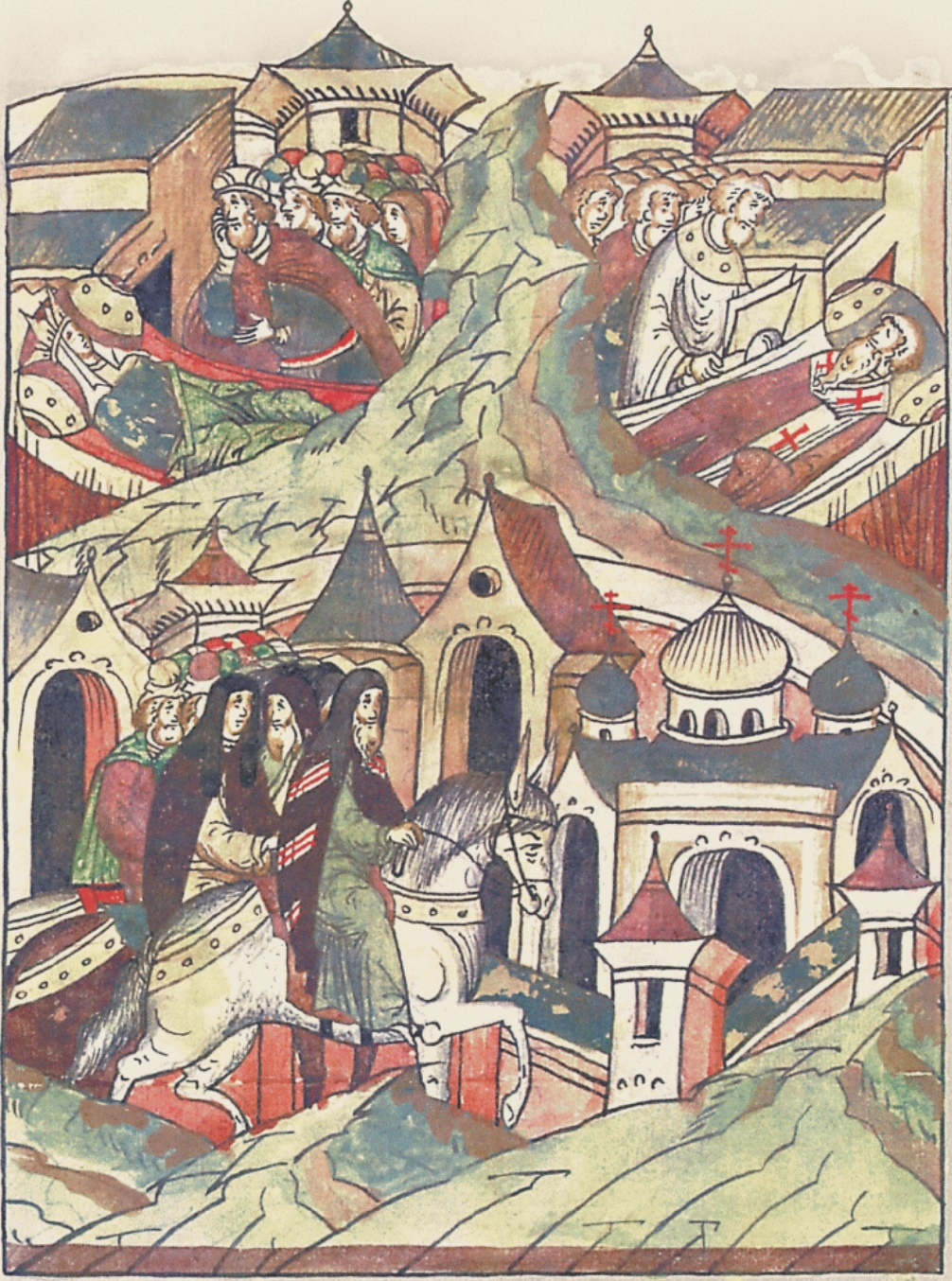
16th century miniature of Christina on her deathbed (top left) with husband Mstislav I next to her; also Death of Daniil Yureviski (top right); and March of courtesans and bishops (below)

Christina Ingesdotter (Swedish: Kristina; 11th century – 18 January 1122) was a Swedish princess and a princess consort of Veliky Novgorod, Rostov and Belgorod, by marriage to Grand Prince Mstislav I of Kiev.

== Life ==
Christina was the daughter of King Inge the Elder of Sweden and Queen Helena. Helena was the sister of Blot-Sven King of Sweden. She was likely the eldest of the three royal daughters, being married before her sisters Margaret and Katarina.

Christina was married to Mstislav, who was Prince of Veliky Novgorod, Rostov, and Belgorod during their marriage, thereby giving her the equivalent titles. According to Vasily Tatishchev they married in 1095. Polish historian Dariusz Dąbrowski stated that Tatischev didn't base on reliable source. Christina married Mstislav between 1090 and 1096.

The personal seal of Christina has been found by archaeologists, depicting a woman with a crown and the aureola of a saint and the inscription "Saint Christina" in Greek. Princess Christina is suggested to have been depicted as Saint Christina in the Nereditsa Church, which has been interpreted as a sign that she may have been worshiped as a local saint.

Her father, king Inge the Elder, died in 1110, and was succeeded on the Swedish throne by his nephews. Living in Rus, Christina was in Sweden counted as too far away to be given a share in the inheritance of her father, leaving only her younger sisters queen Margaret Fredkulla of Denmark and Katarina Ingesdotter as their father's heirs. However, it is known that Margaret shared her inheritance with her niece Ingrid in Norway, and her niece Ingeborg in Denmark, giving them a fourth each: Ingeborg was the daughter of Christina and the only one of her children residing in Scandinavia. She lived in Denmark after her marriage to a Danish prince some years later, which could be counted as a share in the inheritance after her mother, Christina.

Christina died on 18 January 1122. Three years after her death, her spouse Mstislav became Grand Prince of Kiev.

== Issue ==
Christina and Mstislav had ten children:

1. Ingeborg of Kiev, married Canute Lavard of Jutland, and was mother to Valdemar I of Denmark
2. Malmfred, married (1) Sigurd I of Norway; (2) Eric II of Denmark
3. Eupraxia, married Alexius Comnenus, son of John II Comnenus
4. Vsevolod of Novgorod and Pskov
5. Maria Mstislavna of Kiev, married Vsevolod II of Kiev
6. Iziaslav II of Kiev
7. Rostislav of Kiev
8. Sviatopolk of Pskov
9. Rogneda, married Yaroslav of Volinya
10. Xenia, married Briachislav of Izyaslawl
