= Alexios Komnenos (co-emperor) =

Byzantine co-emperor from 1119 to 1142

- Emperor of the Romans
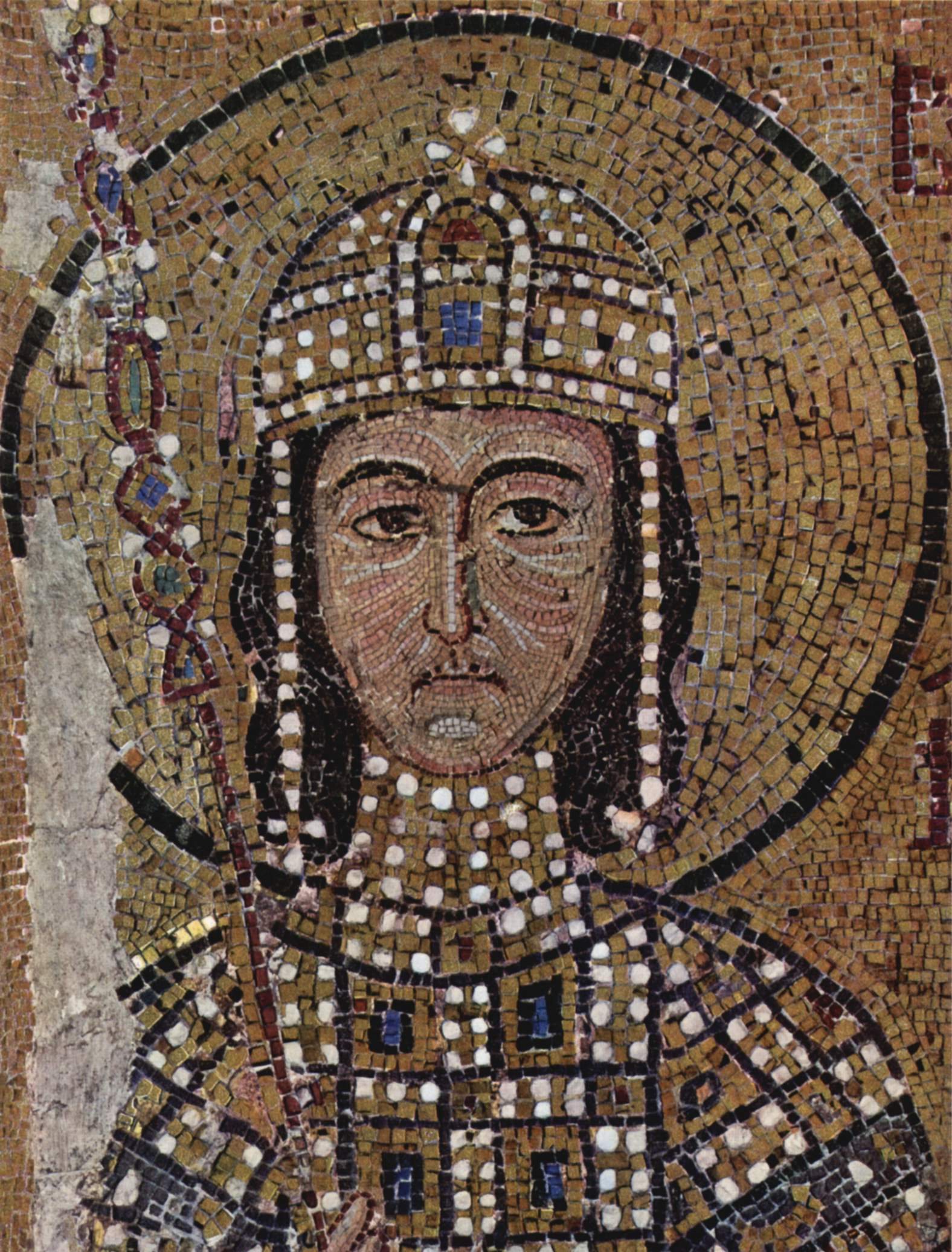
- Mosaic of Alexios Komnenos in Hagia Sophia.

Byzantine co-emperor
- Reign: 1119–1142
- Coronation: 1119 as co-emperor
- Emperor: John II Komnenos
- Born: October 1106; Balabista, Macedonian Theme (now Sidirokastro, Greece)
- Died: Summer 1142 (aged 36); Attaleia, Pamphylia (now Antalya, Turkey)
- Spouse: Eupraxia-Dobrodjeja of Kiev; Eirene-Kata of Georgia
- Issue: Maria Komnene
- Dynasty: Komnenos
- Father: John II Komnenos
- Mother: Irene of Hungary

Alexios Komnenos, latinised as Alexius Comnenus (Greek: Ἀλέξιος Κομνηνός; October 1106 – summer 1142), and sometimes called Alexios the Younger, was the eldest son of the Byzantine emperor John II Komnenos and his wife Eirene of Hungary. He was crowned co-emperor in 1119, at 13 years of age, but predeceased his father in 1142. He was an elder brother of the emperor Manuel I Komnenos, and had a twin sister, Maria Komnene (plus other siblings).

== Life ==
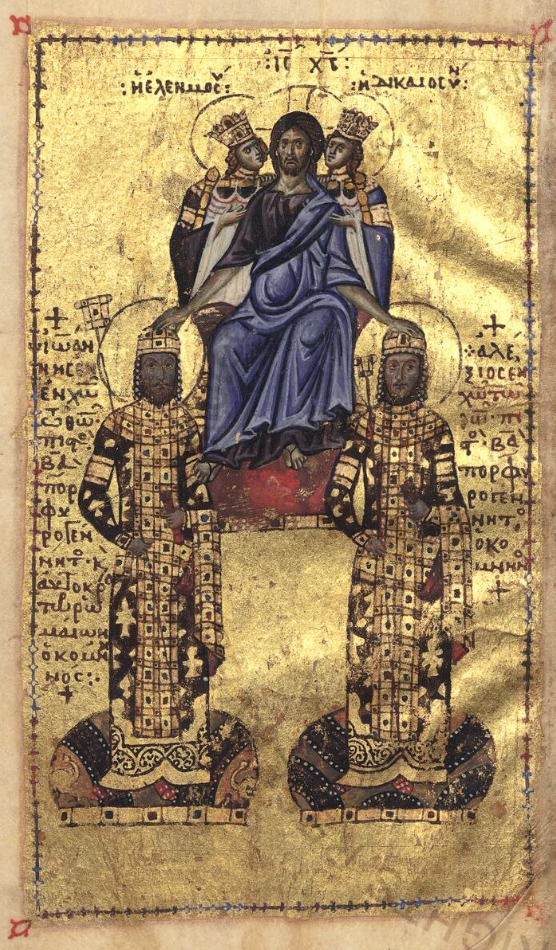
John II and his eldest son Alexios (right), crowned by Christ.

Alexios was born at Balabista (today Sidirokastro) in Macedonia (Greece). His exact birthday is not recorded, but it was shortly before the feast of Demetrius of Thessaloniki on 26 October 1106. He was crowned co-emperor by his father in 1119, between 12 July and 7 October (historians often date his coronation to 1122, but this is a mistake). He died of a sudden disease in summer 1142, only one year before his father's death as the result of a hunting accident. The reign of John II is less well chronicled than those of his father, Alexios I, or successor, Manuel I, and coverage of the life of his son Alexios is very sparse.

A panegyrical poem by Theodore Prodromos was addressed to John and his son on the occasion of the coronation of Alexios. It hailed both rulers as "kings born of kings and emperors, reformers of old customs and privileges, with whom the august throne and sceptre-bearing are a paternal acquisition, a matter of inheritance."

His final illness is described: "...of the severest kind and of short duration, took the form of a rushing fever attacking the head as though it were an acropolis." The location of Alexios' death, at Attalia, suggests that he was on campaign with his father, who had established this city as a base from which to pacify the inland areas around Lake Pousgousē (probably the modern Beyşehir Gölü). Alexios' younger brother Andronikos was charged with escorting the body back to Constantinople, however, while discharging this duty, he too was taken ill and died.

== Family ==
It is possible that Alexios married twice, the first wife being Dobrodjeja Mstislavna of Kiev, a daughter of Mstislav I of Kiev, and the second being Kata of Georgia, a daughter of David IV of Georgia. While both women are known to have married members of the Komnenoi, several theories have been suggested as to the identities of their husband or husbands.

His daughter, Maria Komnene, married the pansebastos Alexios Axouch. He was the son of John Axouch, the megas domestikos (commander-in-chief of the Byzantine army), who was a close friend of John II. Alexios Axuch served as Duke of Cilicia and protostrator. However, he eventually fell out of favor with Manuel I Komnenos in 1167. John Kinnamos and Niketas Choniates report that the accusations against him included the practice of witchcraft. He and an unnamed "Latin wizard" were accused of causing the pregnancy of Maria of Antioch, the Empress consort, to result in a miscarriage. They supposedly managed to do so by providing drugs to Maria. Maria Komnene, "wife of Alexios the protostrator" was mentioned in a seal. According to the Dictionnaire historique et Généalogique des grandes familles de Grèce, d'Albanie et de Constantinople (1983) by Mihail-Dimitri Sturdza, this Maria was suffering from insanity by the end of her life.

They were the parents of John Komnenos "the Fat", a short-lived rival emperor to Alexios III Angelos. Theodora Axuchina, wife of Alexios I of Trebizond, is considered a possible daughter of John the Fat.

== Footnotes ==
Alexios Komnenos (co-emperor) Komnenos dynasty Born: 1106 Died: 1142
Regnal titles
Preceded by John II Komnenos	Byzantine Emperor; 1129–1142; With: John II Komnenos	Succeeded by John II Komnenos
