= Canute Guild =

Crafts organization in Tallinn, Estonia

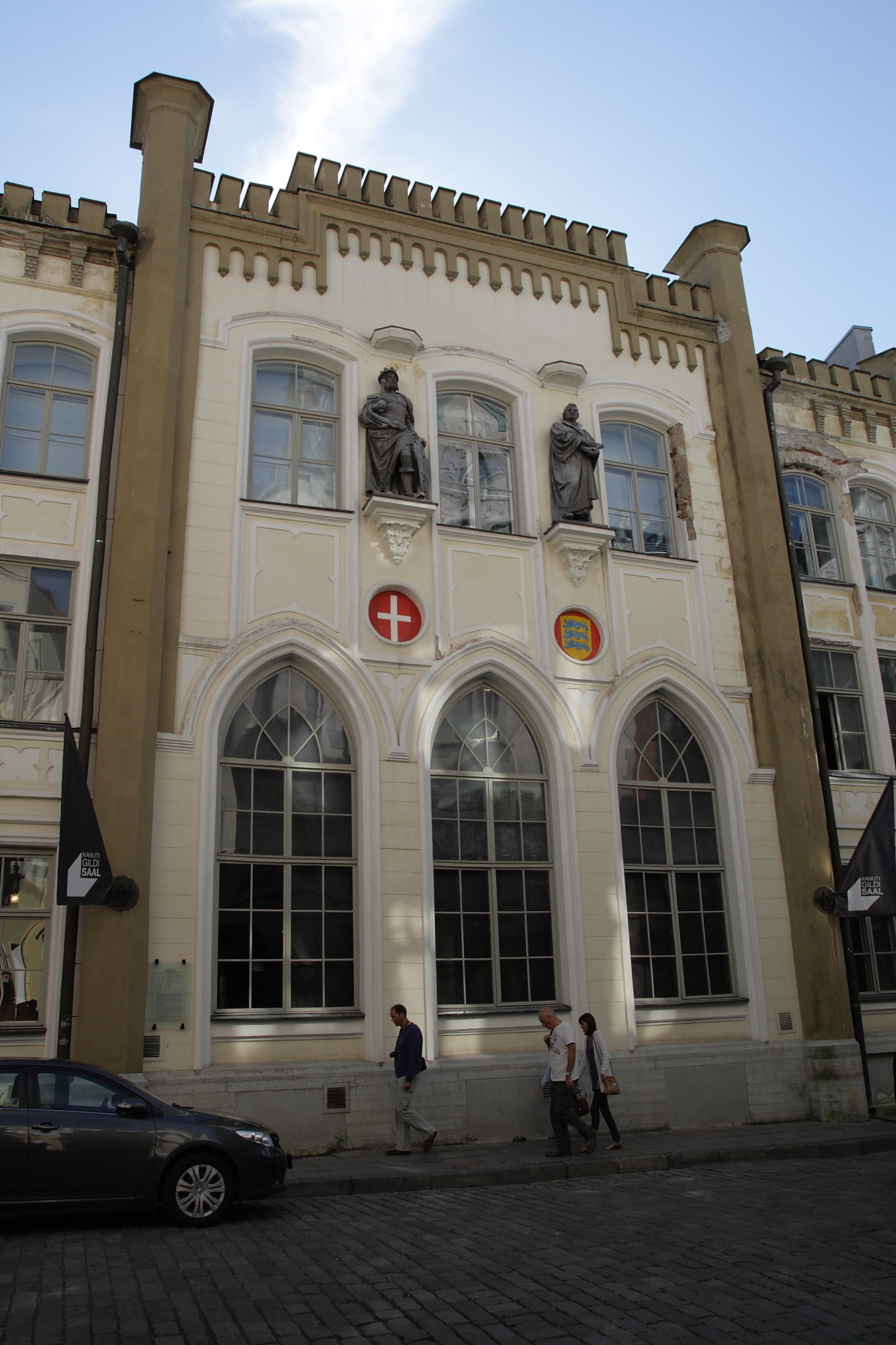
- House of Guilde de Saint-Canut
- Interactive map of the Canute Guild area

General information
- Location: Pikk 20, 10133 Tallinn, Estonia, Tallinn, Estonia
- Coordinates: 59°26′19″N 24°44′46″E
- Opened: 1326; 700 years ago
- Closed: 1920; 106 years ago

Canute Guild (Estonian: Kanuti gild; French: Guilde de Sainte-Canut) was a guild in Tallinn, Estonia. The guild was named after St Knud Lavard (1096−1131), son of Eric I of Denmark, Duke of Schleswig.

The guild was established probably in 13th century; it was mentioned first in 1326. At the beginning, the guild was composed of artisans and merchants. After the creation of the Great Guild (circa 14th century), the merchants relocated thence.

Most of the guild's members were Germans. For Estonians, becoming a member was restricted, especially between 1508 and 1698.

The guild closed in 1920, after around six centuries of service.
