= Mstislav I of Kiev =

Grand Prince of Kiev from 1125 to 1132

Saint Theodore
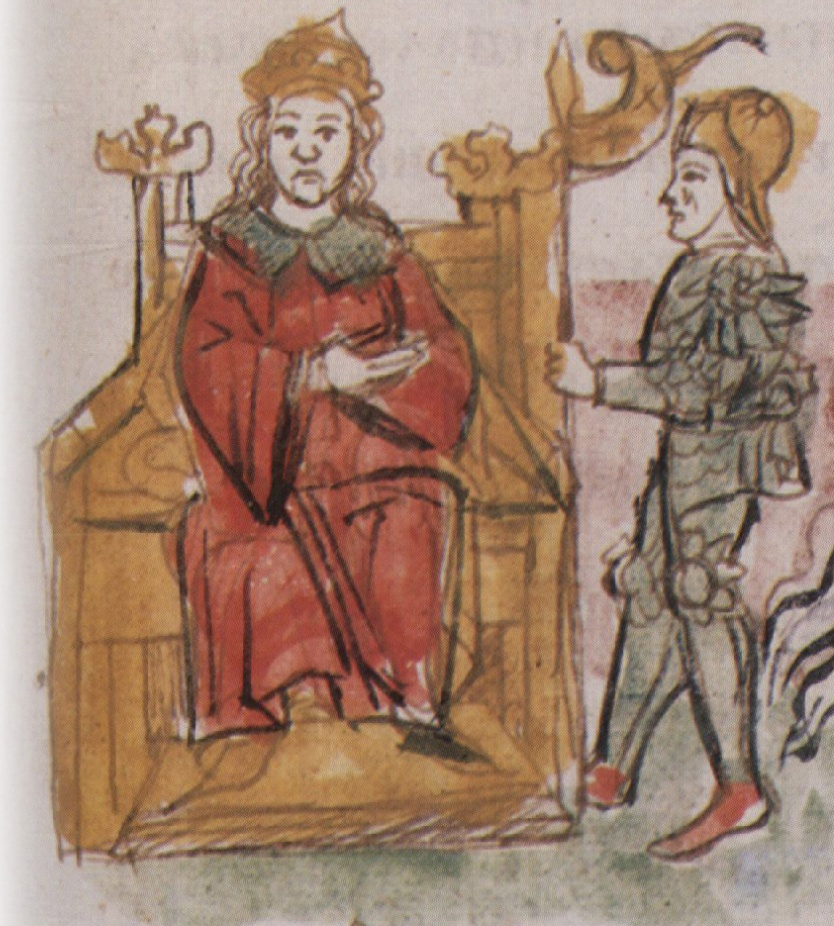
- Mstislav's enthronement in Novgorod depicted in the Radziwiłł Chronicle (15th century)

Right-believing
- Born: February 1076; Turov
- Died: 15 April 1132 (aged 55); Kiev
- Venerated in: Eastern Orthodox Church
- Canonized: before 13th century
- Feast: 15 April

Grand Prince of Kiev
- Reign: 1125–1132
- Predecessor: Vladimir II
- Successor: Yaropolk II

Prince of Rostov
- Reign: 1094–1095

Prince of Novgorod
- Reign: 1088–1117
- Spouse: Christina Ingesdotter of Sweden; Liubava Dmitrievna Zavidich
- Issue: Ingeborg of Kiev; Malmfred of Kiev; Dobrodeia of Kiev; Vsevolod of Pskov; Maria Mstislavna of Kiev; Iziaslav II of Kiev; Rostislav of Kiev; Sviatopolk of Pskov; Rogneda; Xenia; Vladimir III of Kiev; Euphrosyne of Kiev
- Dynasty: Rurik
- Father: Vladimir II Monomakh
- Mother: Gytha of Wessex
- Religion: Eastern Orthodox Christianity

Mstislav I Vladimirovich Monomakh (Old East Slavic: Мьстиславъ Володимѣровичъ Мономахъ, romanized: Mĭstislavŭ Volodiměrovičŭ Monomakhŭ; (Note: Russian: Мстислав Владимирович Великий; Ukrainian: Мстислав Володимирович Великий) Christian name: Theodore (Fedor); February 1076 – 14 April 1132), also known as Mstislav the Great, was Grand Prince of Kiev from 1125 until his death in 1132. After his death, the state began to quickly disintegrate into rival principalities.

He was the eldest son of Vladimir II Monomakh by Gytha of Wessex. He is figured prominently in the Norse Sagas under the name Harald, to allude to his grandfather, Harold II of England.

== Biography ==
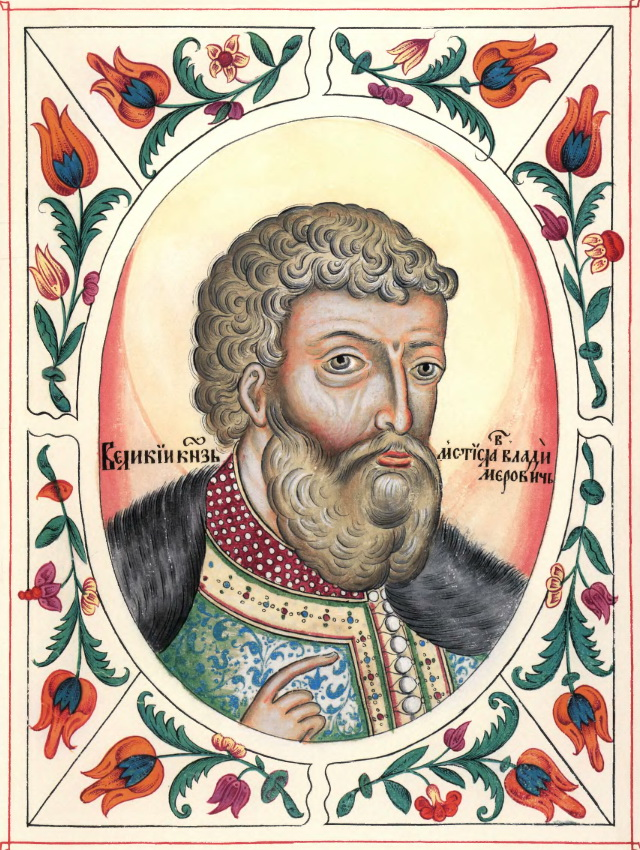
Portrait in the Tsarsky titulyarnik, 1672

Mstislav was born in Turov. As his father's future successor, he reigned in Novgorod from 1088 to 1093 and (after a brief stint at Rostov) from 1095 to 1117. Thereafter, he was Monomakh's co-ruler in Belgorod Kievsky, and inherited the Kievan throne after his death. He built numerous churches in Novgorod, of which St. Nicholas Cathedral (1113), and the cathedral of St Anthony Cloister (1117) survive to the present day. Later, he would also erect important churches in Kiev, notably his family sepulchre at Berestovo and the church of the Assumption of the Mother of God in Podol.

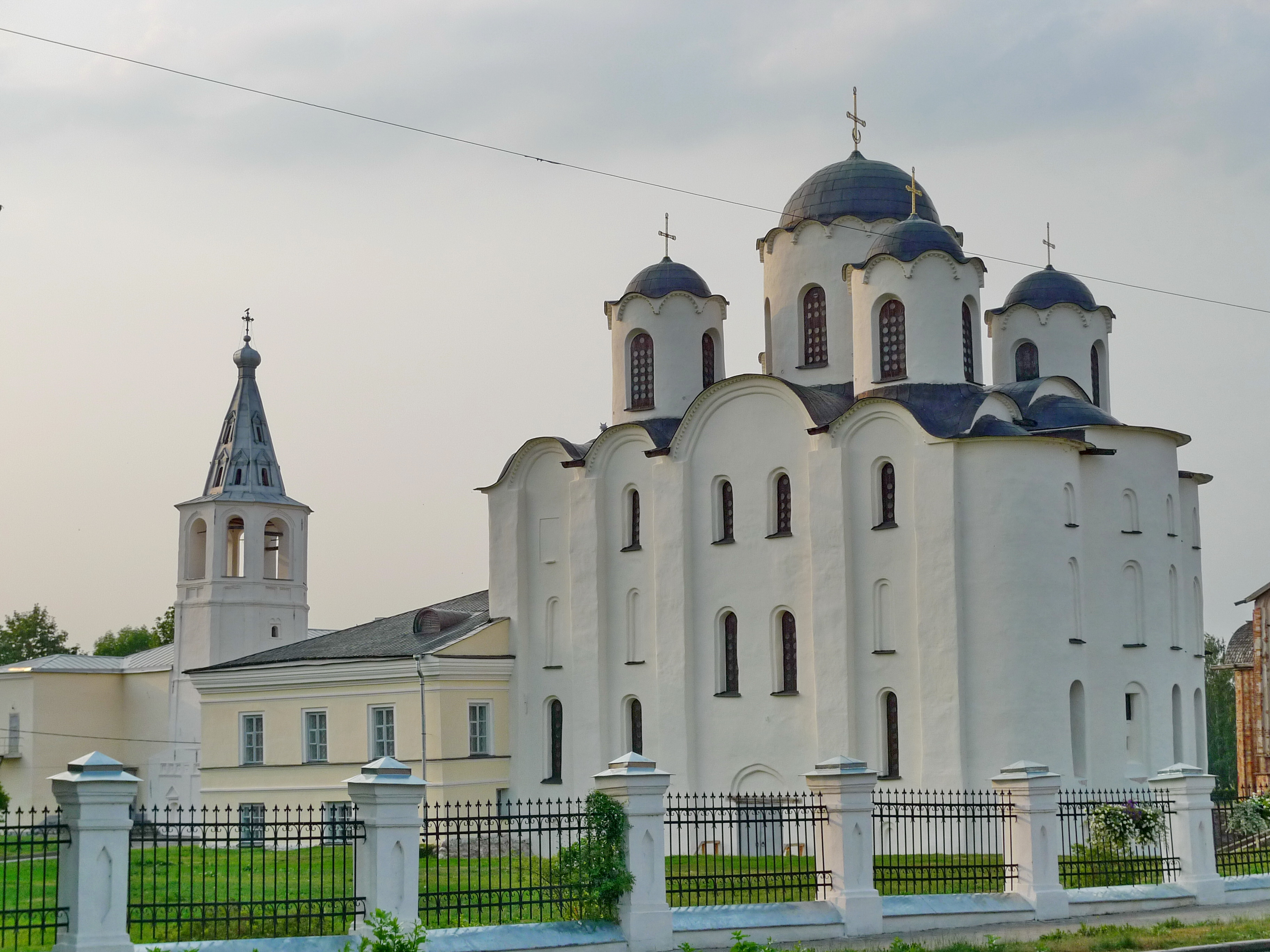
St. Nicholas Cathedral, built by Mstislav I of Kiev near his palace at Yaroslav's Court, Novgorod, contains 12th-century frescoes depicting members of his family.

Mstislav's life was spent in constant warfare with the Cumans (1093; 1107; 1111; 1129), Estonians (1111; 1113; 1116; 1130), Lithuanians (1131), and the princedom of Polotsk (1127; 1129). In 1096, he defeated his uncle Oleg of Chernigov on the Koloksha River, thereby laying foundation for the centuries of enmity between his and Oleg's descendants. Mstislav was the last ruler of a unified state, and upon his death, as the chronicler put it, "the land of Rus was torn apart". He died in Kiev, aged 55.

After his death, the state began to quickly disintegrate. At the time of Monomakhs's death, there had been only two main groups in the princely family, the Monomakhovichi and Olgovichi, but as the family proliferated, it broke up into a number of local branches and sub-branches.

He was canonized as a saint by the Russian Orthodox Church and is commemorated on 15 April in the Eastern Orthodox Church.

== Family ==
In 1095, Mstislav married Princess Christina Ingesdotter of Sweden, daughter of King Inge I of Sweden. They had:

1. Ingeborg of Kiev, married Canute Lavard of Jutland, and was mother to Valdemar I of Denmark
2. Malmfred of Kiev, married (1) Sigurd I of Norway; (2) Eric II of Denmark
3. Eupraxia, married Alexius Comnenus, son of John II Comnenus
4. Vsevolod of Novgorod and Pskov
5. Maria Mstislavna of Kiev, married Vsevolod II of Kiev
6. Iziaslav II of Kiev
7. Rostislav of Kiev
8. Sviatopolk of Pskov
9. Rogneda, married Iaroslav Sviatopolkovich
10. Xenia, married Briachislav of Izyaslavl

Christine died on 18 January 1122. Later that year Mstislav married again, to Liubava Dmitrievna Zavidich, the daughter of Dmitry Zavidich, a nobleman of Novgorod. Their children were:

1. Vladimir III Mstislavich (1132–1171)
2. Euphrosyne of Kiev, (c. 1130 – c. 1193) married King Géza II of Hungary in 1146.

== Sources ==
- Auty, Robert; Obolensky, Dimitri (1976). Companion to Russian Studies: Volume 1: An Introduction to Russian History. Cambridge University Press. ISBN 978-0-521-28038-9.
- Dimnik, Martin (1994). The dynasty of Chernigov. 1054-1146. Toronto: Pontifical Institute of Mediaeval Studies. ISBN 0888441169.
- Dvornik, F. (1947). "The Kiev State and Its Relations with Western Europe". Transactions of the Royal Historical Society. 29.
- Fennell, John (2014). The Crisis of Medieval Russia 1200-1304. Routledge. p. 5. ISBN 978-1-317-87314-3.
- Hamilton, George Heard (1983). The Art and Architecture of Russia. Yale University Press. ISBN 9780140560060.
- Line, Philip (2007). Kingship and State Formation in Sweden: 1130 - 1290. Brill.
- Solovʹev, Sergeĭ Mikhaĭlovich (1976). History of Russia. Academic International Press. ISBN 978-0-87569-238-8.

Mstislav I Vladimirovich the Great Rurik Born: 1 June 1076 Died: 14 April 1132
Regnal titles
Preceded by Sviatopolk Iziaslavich	Prince of Novgorod; 1088–1093; 1095-1117	Succeeded by Davyd Sviatoslavich
Preceded by Sviatopolk Iziaslavich	Prince of Rostov; 1093–1095	Succeeded by Davyd Sviatoslavich
Preceded by Vladimir II Monomakh	Grand Prince of Kiev; 1125–1132	Succeeded by Yaropolk II Vladimirovich
