= Estrid Bjørnsdotter =

Queen of Norway from 1170 to 1176

Estrid Bjornsdotter

Queen consort of Norway
- Tenure: 1170–1176
- Spouse: Tore Skinnfeld; Magnus V of Norway
- Issue: Sigurd Magnusson?
- Father: Björn Byrdasvend
- Mother: Rangrid Guttormsdotter

Estrid Bjørnsdotter also called Estrid Byrdasvend and Eldrid Bjarnesdatter (12th century) was a Norwegian Queen consort, spouse of King Magnus V of Norway.

Estrid Bjørnsdotter was the daughter of Björn Byrdasvend and Rangrid Guttormsdotter, who was a possible descendant of Tostig Godwinson, the brother of the last Anglo-Saxon King of England Harold Godwinson. She was the widow of Tore Skinnfeld. She later married King Magnus V in the year of 1170, and thereby became queen of Norway.

Preceded by Ragna Nikolasdatter	Queen Consort of Norway; 1170–1176	Succeeded by Margaret of Sweden
