= Magnus Sigurdsson =

King of Norway from 1130 to 1135

King of Norway
- Reign: 1130–1135
- Predecessor: Sigurd I
- Successor: Harald IV
- Co-ruler: Harald IV
- Reign: 1137–1139
- Predecessor: Harald IV
- Successor: Sigurd II and Inge I
- Co-ruler: Sigurd Slembe (?)
- Born: c. 1115
- Died: 12 November 1139; Holmengrå, Hvaler
- Spouse: Christine of Denmark
Names
- Magnus Sigurdsson
- House: Hardrada
- Father: Sigurd the Crusader
- Mother: Borghild Olafsdatter (concubine)

Magnus Sigurdsson (c. 1115 – 12 November 1139), also known as Magnus the Blind and Magnus IV, was King of Norway from 1130 to 1135 and again from 1137 to 1139. His period as king marked the beginning of the civil war era in Norway, which lasted until 1240.

== Biography ==
Magnus was the son of King Sigurd I of Norway and Borghild Olavsdotter. When King Sigurd died in 1130, Magnus became king of Norway together with his uncle Harald Gille. After four years of uneasy peace, Magnus began to openly prepare for war on Harald; the conflict between them was the start of the 110-year civil war in Norway. Harald had the most support in Viken, while Magnus had control over Trøndelag and Vestlandet

On August 9, 1134, he defeated Harald in the decisive Battle of Fyrileiv in Stångenäs herred in Båhuslen. Harald fled to Denmark.

Against the advice of his lendmen, as Harald's forces grew, Magnus disbanded his army and traveled to Bergen to spend the winter there. Harald then returned to Norway with a new army and the support of the Danish King Erik Emune.

=== Norwegian civil wars ===
Starting with turbulent reign of Magnus IV, who himself ascended as king in 1130 amidst Norway’s civil wars and met his end in 1139, the period from 1130 to 1240 witnessed several interlocked conflicts of varying scale and intensity. The background for these conflicts were the unclear Norwegian succession laws, social conditions and the struggle between church and king. There were then two main parties, firstly known by varying names or no names at all, but finally condensed into parties of Bagler and Birkebeiner. The rallying point regularly was a royal son, who was set up as the head figure of the party in question, to oppose the rule of king from the contesting party. (Note: Baglers and Birkebeiners did not exist before until about 30 years later, so this entry is not relevant to the subject matter, as it was a completely different war, in the same historical series of conflicts)

=== Battle of Bergen ===
The Battle of Bergen (1135) decided the conflict over the exclusive right to royal power in the kingdom between the co-kings Magnus Sigurdsson and Harald Gille. Meeting little opposition, Harald reached Bergen before Christmas 1134. Harald Gille did not want to fight at Christmas, which was a holy time, and waited until 7 January 1135. Harald entered the city with his forces, and Magnus' small army disbanded. Several escaped, and Magnus and several of his men tried to get away on the king's ship, but the whole of Vågen was closed with an iron chain, and they could not get off. Only a few men were left of Magnus' army, and several of his men were killed.

Magnus was captured, dethroned, and handed him over to Harald's slaves. Magnus was mutilated by gouging out his eyes, cutting off a foot and castrating him. After this he was known as Magnus the Blind (Magnus Sigurdsson den blinde).

Snorre quotes from a quadri, Haraldsdråpa, by skald Einar Skulason about the battle:

Vågen in Bergen
a week was closed.
Gone could army ships
from the city a danger.

=== After the Battle of Bergen ===
Magnus was put in Nidarholm Abbey on the island of Munkholmen in Trondheim Fjord, where he spent some time as a monk. He was maintained by the income from the Hernes farm on the Frosta peninsula.

Harald Gille was killed in 1136 by Sigurd Slembe, another royal pretender who had himself proclaimed king in 1135. To back his claim, Sigurd Slembe brought Magnus back from the abbey and made him co-king. They decided to split up their forces, and Magnus headed for eastern Norway, where he had most popular support. There, he was defeated at the Battle of Minne by the forces of King Inge I. He then fled to Götaland and subsequently to Denmark, where he tried to get support for his cause. An attempted invasion of Norway by King Erik Emune of Denmark failed miserably.

Magnus then rejoined Sigurd Slembe's men, but they continued to have little support in Norway. After some time spent more like bandits than kings, they met the forces of King Inge I and King Sigurd II in a final battle on November 12, 1139. Magnus fell during the naval Battle of Holmengrå south of Hvaler in the Oslofjord. The loyal guard Reidar Grjotgardsson lifted his king at the final battle, but a spear impaled them both. Magnus was buried in the Church of St. Hallvard in Oslo. There is a monument erected in memory of King Magnus the Blind at the Storedal farm in Skjeberg in Østfold county.

== Bibliography ==
- Snorre Sturlason, Norges kongesagaer. Oversatt av Anne Holtsmark. Gyldendal, Oslo 1979

Magnus the Blind House of Hardrada Cadet branch of the Fairhair dynasty Born: 1115 Died: 1139
Regnal titles
| Preceded by Sigurd I | King of Norway; 1130–1135 with Harald IV | Succeeded by Harald IV |
| Preceded by Harald IV | King of Norway; 1137–1139 with Sigurd II; Inge I | Succeeded by Sigurd II; Inge I |
