= Family tree of Swedish monarchs =

The following is a family tree of all the Kings of Sweden, from Eric the Victorious down to the present day.

== Family Tree ==
Eric the Victorious (945–995) r. 970–995
Olof Skötkonung (980–1022) r. 995–1022	Estrid of the Obotrites; 979–1035
Emund the Old r. 1050–1060	Anund Jacob (1008–1050) r. 1022–1050
Stenkil r. 1060–1066	Unknown name	Eric and Eric r. 1066–1067	Anund Gårdske r. 1070–1075	Håkan the Red r. 1075–1079
Halsten Stenkilsson (1050–1084) r. 1067–1070, 1079–1084	Inge the Elder (d. 1105) r. 1079–1084, 1087–1105	Helena	Blot-Sweyn r. 1084–1087
Philip Halstensson r. 1105–1118	Inge the Younger r. 1110–1125	Ragnvald Knaphövde r. 1125–1126	Niels, King of Denmark (1065–1134)	Margaret Fredkulla; 1080s–1130	Ragnvald Ingesson	Katarina Ingesdotter	Björn Haraldsen Ironside (d. 1134)
Ulvhild Håkansdotter (1095–1148)	Sverker I (1100–1156) r. c. 1130 – 1156	Richeza of Poland (1116–1156)	Magnus Nielsen (1106–1134) r. 1126 – c. 1132	Ingrid Ragnvaldsdotter (1105–1161)	Henrik Skadelår	Christina of Denmark (1125–1170)	Saint Erik r. 1155–1160
Karl Sverkersson (1130–1167) r. 1161–1167	Boleslaw r. 1167–1173	Sophia of Minsk (1140–1198)	Valdemar I of Denmark (1131–1182)	Magnus Henriksson r. 1160–1161	Knut Eriksson (1150–1195) r. 1167–1195
Sverker II (1163–1208) r. 1196–1208	Rikissa of Denmark (1190–1220)	Erik Knutsson (1180–1216) r. 1208–1216
Johan Sverkersson (1201–1222) r. 1216–1222	Birger Jarl (1200–1266)	Ingeborg Eriksdotter (1212–1254)	Erik Eriksson (1216–1250) r. 1222–1229, 1234–1250	Knut Långe r. 1229–1234
Magnus Ladulås (1240–1290) r. 1275–1290	Valdemar (1239–1302) r. 1250–1275
Duke Erik (1282–1318)	Birger (1280–1318) r. 1290–1318
Albert II, Duke of Mecklenburg (1319–1379)	Euphemia of Sweden (1317–1370)	Valdemar IV of Denmark (1320–1375)	Magnus Eriksson (1316–1374) r. 1319–1364
Albert (1338–1412) r. 1364–1389	Ingeborg of Mecklenburg c. 1345–1395	Henry III, Duke of Mecklenburg (1337–1383)	Ingeborg of Denmark (1347–1370)	Margaret I (1353–1412) r. 1389–1412	Haakon Magnusson (1340–1380) r. 1362–1364	Erik Magnusson (1339–1359) r. 1356–1359
Wartislaw VII, Duke of Pomerania (1363–1394)	Maria of Mecklenburg-Schwerin (1363–1408)	Gerhard VI, Count of Holstein-Rendsburg c. 1367–1404
John, Count Palatine of Neumarkt (1383–1443)	Catherine of Pomerania (1390–1426)	Erik of Pomerania (1382–1459) r. 1396–1439	Hedvig of Holstein (1398–1436)
Christopher (1416–1448) r. 1440–1448	Dorothea of Brandenburg (1430–1495)	Christian I (1426–1481) r. 1457–1464	Karl Knutsson (1409–1470) r. 1448–1457, 1464–1465
Hans (1455–1513) r. 1497–1501	Frederick I of Denmark (1471–1533)
Gustav I (1496–1560); Regent 1521–1523 r. 1523–1560	Christian II (1481–1559) r. 1520–1521	Christian III of Denmark; 1503–1559	Adolf, Duke of Holstein-Gottorp (1526–1586)
Erik XIV (1533–1577) r. 1560–1568	John III (1537–1592) r. 1568–1592	Charles IX (1550–1611); Regent 1599–1604 r. 1604–1611	John Adolf, Duke of Holstein-Gottorp (1575–1616)
Sigismund (1566–1632) r. 1592–1599	Gustav II Adolph (1594–1632) r. 1611–1632	Princess Catherine (1584–1638)	John Casimir, Count Palatine of Kleeburg; 1589–1652	Frederick III, Duke of Holstein-Gottorp (1597–1659)
Christina (1626–1689) r. 1632–1654	Charles X Gustav (1622–1660) r. 1654–1660	Christina Magdalena of the Palatinate-Zweibrücken (1616–1662)	Frederick VI, Margrave of Baden-Durlach (1617–1677)
Charles XI (1655–1697) r. 1660–1697	John Frederick, Margrave of Brandenburg-Ansbach; 1654–1686	Johanna Elisabeth of Baden-Durlach (1651–1680)	Frederick VII, Margrave of Baden-Durlach (1647–1709)	Christian Albert, Duke of Holstein-Gottorp (1641–1695)
Frederick I (1676–1751) r. 1720–1751	Ulrika Eleonora (1688–1741) r. 1718–1720	Charles XII (1682–1718) r. 1697–1718	Dorothea Friederike of Brandenburg-Ansbach (1676–1731)	Johann Reinhard III, Count of Hanau-Lichtenberg (1665–1736)	Margravine Albertina Frederica of Baden-Durlach (1682–1755)	Christian August of Holstein-Gottorp, Prince of Eutin (1673–1726)
Louis VIII, Landgrave of Hesse-Darmstadt (1691–1768)	Countess Charlotte of Hanau-Lichtenberg (1700–1726)	Adolf Frederick (1710–1771) r. 1751–1771
Prince George William of Hesse-Darmstadt (1722–1782)
Maximilian I Joseph of Bavaria (1756–1825)	Princess Augusta Wilhelmine of Hesse-Darmstadt (1765–1796)	Gustav III (1746–1792) r. 1771–1792	Charles XIII (1748–1818) r. 1809–1818
Charles XIV John (1763–1844); Elected Crown Prince by the Riksdag 1810 r. 1818–1844	Eugène de Beauharnais (1781–1824)	Princess Augusta of Bavaria (1788–1851)	Gustav IV Adolf (1778–1837) r. 1792 – 1809
Oscar I (1799–1859) r. 1844–1859	Josephine of Leuchtenberg (1807–1876)	Leopold, Grand Duke of Baden (1790–1852)	Princess Sophie (1801–1865)	Crown Prince Gustav (1799–1877)
Charles XV (1826–1872) r. 1859–1872	Prince Gustaf; Duke of Uppland (1827–1852)	Oscar II (1829–1907) r. 1872–1907	Frederick I, Grand Duke of Baden (1826–1907)
Frederick VIII of Denmark (1843–1912)	Princess Louise; Queen consort of Denmark (1851–1926)	Prince Carl Oscar; Duke of Södermanland (1852–1854)	Gustaf V (1858–1950) r. 1907–1950	Victoria of Baden (1862–1930)
Gustaf VI Adolf (1882–1973) r. 1950–1973
Prince Gustaf Adolf; Duke of Västerbotten (1906–1947)
Carl XVI Gustaf (b. 1946) r. 1973–present
Crown Princess Victoria; Duchess of Västergötland (b. 1977) (Crown Princess 1980–present)	Prince Carl Philip; Duke of Värmland (b. 1979) (Crown Prince 1979)
Princess Estelle; Duchess of Östergötland (b. 2012)
