= House of Stenkil =

Swedish royal dynasty

The House of Stenkil is a modern name for the royal dynasty that ruled over Sweden from around 1060 to the 1120s. It has received its name from its first king, Stenkil, who according to the Westrogothic Law's king list originated from Västergötland and who was probably married into the old royal dynasty that died out around 1060. Stenkil died c. 1066 and our knowledge of the following two decades is very uncertain and sparse. Immediately after his death, civil wars are said to have broken out between two claimants to the throne, both named Erik, one of whom may possibly have been Stenkil's son. Sometimes Håkan the Red is also identified as Stenkil's son. What is certain is that Stenkil was the father of kings Halsten and Inge the Elder. Halsten was in turn the father of kings Philip and Inge the Younger. When the latter died, the Stenkil dynasty died out in the male line.

It is not unlikely that all kings during the 12th century were in one way or another related to the Stenkil dynasty. The connections that are known went through Inge the Elder's children (three daughters and one son named Margaret Fredkulla, Katarina, Christina, and Ragnvald). Margareta's son Magnus Nilsson laid claim to the Swedish throne in the 1120s and succeeded in being elected king by the Geats. Katarina became mother-in-law to Erik the Holy, who was the ancestor of the House of Erik. Ragnvald became maternal grandfather to the Danish prince Magnus Henriksson, who laid claim to Sweden's throne around 1160 and killed both Sverker the Elder and Erik the Holy. No close connection between the Stenkil dynasty and the House of Sverker is known, but Christina Ingesdotter became great-grandmother to Karl Sverkersson's wife.

== Parentage of Stenkil ==
The Hervarar saga (13th century) describes Stenkil as the son of Ragnvald the Old and Astrid Njalsdotter, the daughter of Njal Finnsson from Hålogaland in Norway and a cognatic descendant of Harald Fairhair. Later historians have identified the father of Stenkil as Ragnvald Ulfsson who was the earl of Ladoga and the grandson of the legendary Viking Skoglar Toste, but this presumed family-connection is not supported by any other sources and must therefore be regarded as very uncertain. The Icelandic sagas mention a wife and two sons of Ragnvald Ulfsson but none are identified with Stenkil and his mother Astrid. The contemporary chronicler Adam of Bremen says Stenkil was the nephew (nepos) or stepson (privignus) of the former King Emund the Old, while the Hervarar saga asserts that he was related to the previous dynasty by marriage to Emund's daughter.

== Kings of the Stenkil Dynasty ==
Portrait	Name	Reign	Succession	Marriage(s)	Life details
	Stenkil; Steinkell Ragnvaldsson	c. 1060 – 1066 (c. 6 years)	Possibly son-in-law of Emund (Note: Stenkil is traditionally held to have married "Ingamoder", a daughter of Emund the Old, but sources are too scanty to confidently establish whether this took place. He was also connected to the Munsö dynasty through his father Ragnvald Ulfsson being the nephew of Sigrid the Haughty, mother of Olof Skötkonung.)	"Ingamoder" (?) (at least 2 children)	Died c. 1066
	Eric and Eric; Erik och Erik (historicity disputed)	c. 1066 (?) (briefly)	Recorded in only one source (Note: Eric and Eric are recorded only by Adam of Bremen and are not included in any of the known medieval king lists on Swedish rulers, neither native Swedish lists nor Icelandic sources. Liljegren (2004) highlights their dubious history by describing them as "the most anonymous royal figures in Sweden's history" and further states that the period immediately after Stenkil appears to have lacked any real king, with "magnates [standing against] magnates".) as two pretenders who fought each other after Stenkil's death.	Nothing recorded	Older tradition describes one of the Erics as a son of Stenkil ("Eric Stenkilsson"), though these assumptions cannot be substantiated by the historical record.
	Halsten; Halsten Stenkilsson	c. 1066 – 1068 (c. 2 years)	Son of Stenkil	Unknown queen (at least 2 children)	Few life details known. Deposed c. 1068. Possibly later returned to rule as co-ruler with his (likely younger) brother Inge I.
	Inge "the Elder"; Inge den äldre	c. 1078 – 1112 (c. 34 years)	Son of Stenkil. Seized power, either from Anund or Håkan.	Helena (4 children)	Died c. 1112 Ended the period of anarchy begun after Stenkil's death. Maybe deposed c. 1081–1083 before regaining the throne.
	Philip; Filip Halstensson	c. 1100 – 1118 (c. 18 years)	Son of Halsten. Appears to have begun his reign as a co-ruler with Inge the Elder.	Ingegerd of Norway (childless)	Died 1118
	Inge "the Younger"; Inge (den yngre) Halstensson	c. 1118 – 1125/1130 (c. 7–12 years)	Son of Halsten. Possibly initially co-ruler with Philip.	Ulvhild Håkansdotter (childless)	Died c. 1130 Likely the last male-line member of Stenkil's dynasty.
	Ragnvald "Knaphövde"	1120s/1130s (?) (briefly?)	No known connection to previous kings. Recorded in Västgötalagen as the successor of Inge II and predecessor of Sverker I.	Nothing recorded	Few life details known

Cognatic offshoots:

Portrait	Name	Reign	Succession	Marriage(s)	Life details
	Magnus I "the Strong"; Magnus (den starke) Nilsson (status disputed)	c. 1125 – 1130 or c. 1130 – 1134 (c. 4–5 years)	Grandson of Inge the Elder. Attested only as a pretender in the Gesta Danorum; perhaps never recognized as king.	Richeza of Poland (2 children)	Died in 1134 Elected king but failed to establish his power; killed in 1134 at the Battle of Fotevik.
	Magnus II; Magnus Henriksson	18 May 1160 – 1161 (1 year)	Great-grandson of Inge I. Seized power after murdering Eric IX. (Note: The regnal list published by the royal court of Sweden includes him as a member of Stenkil dynasty; some tend to call him as the "last" monarch of the House of Stenkil which however is a genealogically debatable concept. He was the son of a daughter of Inge the Elder's son Ragnvald.)	Bridget Haraldsdotter (childless)	Died in 1161 Killed in battle against Charles VII.

== Family tree ==
House of Stenkil Family tree

Emund the Old
Stenkil	Emundsdotter
Halsten	Inge the Elder	Helena
Philip	Inge the Younger	Christina	Ragnvald possibly Ragnvald Knaphövde	Margareta Fredkulla	Katarina
Ingrid Ragnvaldsdotter	Magnus the Strong
Magnus Henriksson

== Bibliography ==
- Bolin, Sture (1953a). "Erik och Erik". Svenskt biografiskt lexikon (in Swedish).
- Bolin, Sture (1953b). "Konung Filip". Svenskt biografiskt lexikon (in Swedish).
- Bolin, Sture (1953c). "Inge d.y." Svenskt biografiskt lexikon (in Swedish).
- Bolin, Sture (1953d). "Ragnvald". Svenskt biografiskt lexikon (in Swedish).
- Bolin, Sture (1953j). "Magnus Henriksson". Svenskt biografiskt lexikon (in Swedish).
- Liljegren, Bengt (2004). Rulers of Sweden (in Swedish). Stockholm: Historiska Media. ISBN 9789185057634.
- Lindkvist, Thomas (2003). "Kings and provinces in Sweden". In Helle, Knut (ed.). The Cambridge History of Scandinavia: Volume I: Prehistory to 1520. Cambridge: Cambridge University Press. pp. 221–234. ISBN 0-521-472997.
- Nyberg, Tore (2018). Monasticism in North-Western Europe, 800–1200. Routledge. ISBN 978-1-315-19454-7.
- Sävborg, Daniel (2015). "Kungalängder och historieskrivning: Fornsvenska och fornisländska källor om Sveriges historia". Historisk Tidskrift (in Swedish). 135 (2): 201–235. ISSN 0345-469X.
- Venning, Timothy (2023). A Compendium of Medieval World Sovereigns. Taylor & Francis. ISBN 9781000866339.
- Williamson, David (1988). Debrett's Kings and Queens of Europe. London: Webb & Bower. ISBN 0-86350-194-X.

*Royal House* House of Stenkil
Preceded by House of Munsö	Ruling House of the Kingdom of Sweden; 1060–1125	Succeeded by House of Sverker
