= List of monarchs of Sweden =

His Majesty the King of Sweden
- Sveriges konung
- Greater coat of arms of Sweden

Incumbent
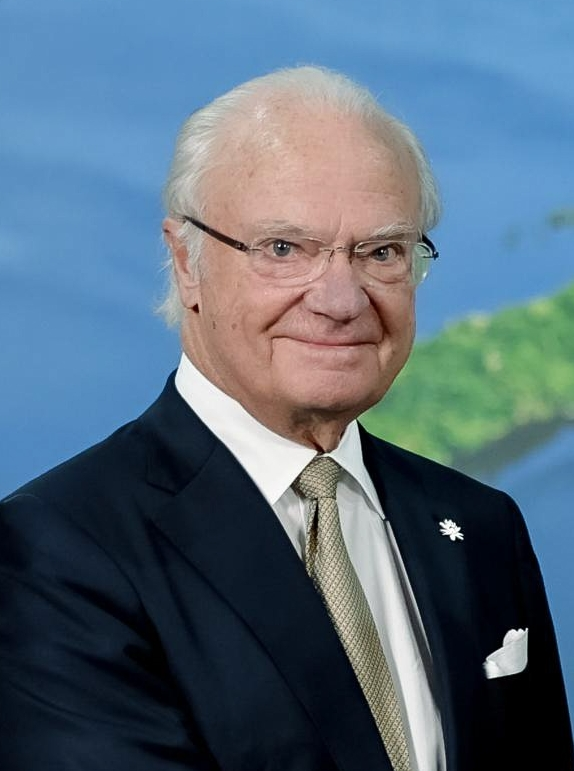
- Carl XVI Gustaf since 15 September 1973

Details
- Style: His Majesty
- Heir apparent: Victoria
- Formed: Before c. 970; 1056 years ago
- Residences: Stockholm Palace; Drottningholm Palace
- Appointer: Elective monarchy (until 1544; 482 years ago); Hereditary monarchy (since 1544)
- Website: www.kungahuset.se

This list records the monarchs of Sweden, from the late Viking Age to the present day. Sweden has continuously been a monarchy since the country's consolidation in the Viking Age and early Middle Ages, for over a thousand years. The incumbent Swedish royal family is the House of Bernadotte, established on the throne in 1818.

== History ==
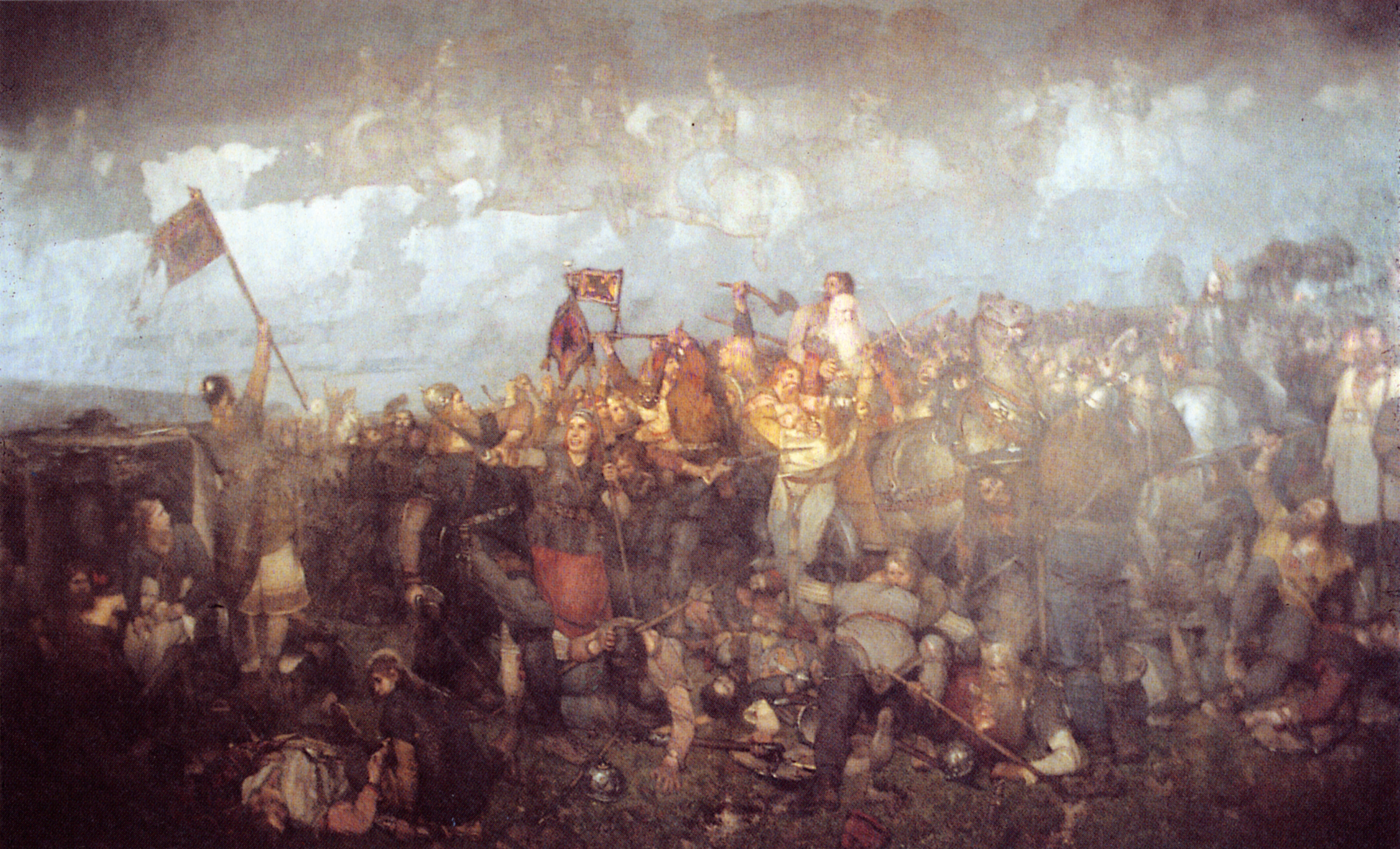
Painting representing the Battle of Bråvalla, a legendary battle which supposedly took place in the 8th century, fought partly between the Svear and Götar

There were organized political structures in Sweden before the kingdom was unified; based on archaeological evidence, early tribal societies are believed to have transitioned into organized chiefdoms in the first few centuries AD. In the period AD 500–800, Scandinavian societies began adopting cultural elements from the newly established Germanic kingdoms in Europe, transitioning further into petty kingdoms.

Foreign sources and later native sources describe the later medieval kingdom as being composed of two main regions: Svealand (particularly around Lake Mälaren) and Götaland. Sources from as early as the Roman author Tacitus (c. 56–126) mention two main peoples or tribes in modern Sweden: the Svear (Swedes) and Götar (Geats); the Svear are mentioned in more foreign sources than the Götar, credited with military activities at sea. The securely attested Swedish rulers in the Viking Age, predecessors of the later line of Swedish kings, ruled from the religious and political center of Old Uppsala; though its history before the Viking Age is poorly attested, it is probable that Old Uppsala had been a political and religious center since the Migration Period.

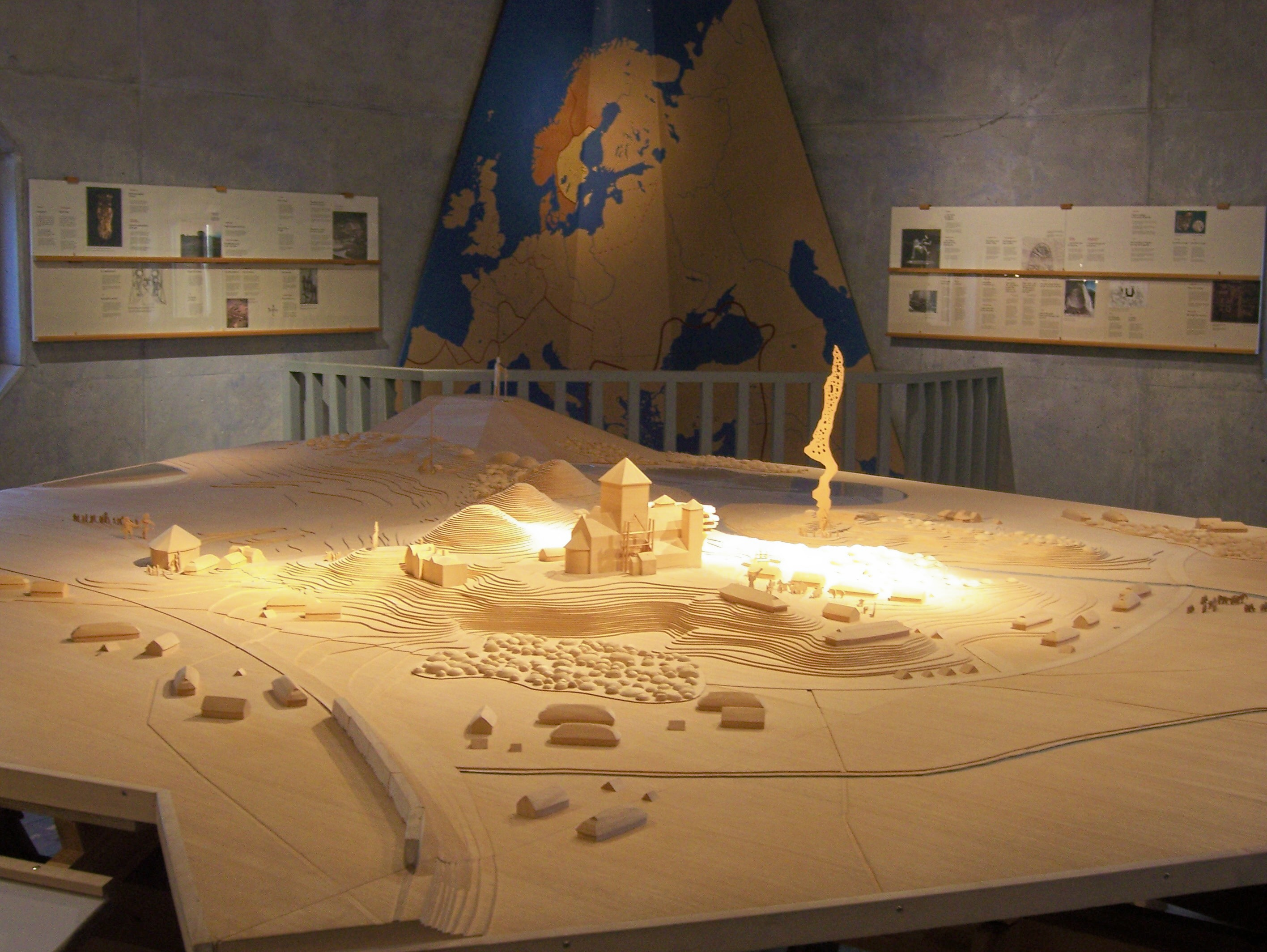
Reconstruction of Old Uppsala, the center of the protohistoric Swedish petty kingdom which gave rise to the medieval Swedish kingdom

The earliest historically attested Swedish rulers are 9th-century petty kings from the Vita Ansgarii, an account written c. 870 by Rimbert partly concerning Saint Ansgar's visit to Svealand. Some kings of Old Uppsala are also mentioned in later Icelandic texts and sagas. The line of legendary Swedish kings from Icelandic tradition, called sagokungar in Swedish, are not generally treated as historical figures, though some may be based on actual chieftains or petty kings. Some later king-lists deliberately extended the sequence of kings for nationalistic purposes, such as Johannes Magnus's Historia de omnibus Gothorum Sueonumque regibus (1554); supposed ancient kings mentioned in such sources are clearly fictional.

The petty kingdoms eventually gave rise to more complex political structures and what is today considered the beginning of the Swedish kingdom developed over the course of the Viking Age and the subsequent Middle Ages. For a consecutive list from then, the first Swedish king of whom anything definite is known is the 10th-century Eric the Victorious, though the information reported about him in different sources is scarce. Eric's son Olof Skötkonung was the first king to be baptized in Sweden and is credited with founding a Christian kingdom. The early and then medieval Swedish kingdom was an elective monarchy, with kings being elected from particularly prominent families; this practice did however often result in de facto dynastic succession and the formation of royal dynasties, such as those of Eric (intermittently c. 1157–1250) and Bjälbo (1250–1364) as well as infighting between rival families.

From 1389 to 1523, Sweden was often united with Denmark and Norway under the kings of the Kalmar Union. Gustav I led Sweden out of the union in 1523. In 1544 Gustav formally abandoned the previous elective monarchy in favor of hereditary succession. Initially adopting the medieval "King of Swedes and Geats", he later adopted the lengthier title rex Svecorum Gothorum Vandalorumque ("king of the Swedes, Geats and Wends"). The last monarch to be titled as king of the Swedes, Geats and Wends was Gustaf VI Adolf (r. 1950–1973) since his successor, the present king Carl XVI Gustaf, upon his accession adopted the shortened title "King of Sweden".

In 1980, the rule of succession was changed from agnatic to absolute primogeniture, to the benefit of Princess Victoria (born 1977), the current heir apparent.

== Monarchs and regents of Sweden ==
=== House of Munsö (970–1060) ===
Munsö dynasty

Portrait	Name	Reign	Succession	Marriage(s)	Life details
	Eric (VII) (Note: Swedish monarchs in the Middle Ages and before did not use regnal numbers. In the 16th century, kings Eric XIV and Charles IX assumed ahistorical and exaggerated regnal numbers based on the fictitious Swedish history Historia de omnibus Gothorum Sueonumque regibus, which invented several kings of both names. Later kings enumerated themselves after them, and the exaggerated regnal numbers have also been retroactively applied to the earlier kings named Eric and Charles. The numbering used for earlier kings in this list follows the count in Historia de omnibus Gothorum Sueonumque regibus for consistency, which for instance means counting Eric Årsäll but not "Eric and Eric".) "the Victorious"; Erik Segersäll	c. 970 (Note: Eric's accession is traditionally dated to 970, but the date is highly uncertain. Modern scholars often maintain that he died c. 995 but omit the year of his accession.) – c. 995 (c. 25 years)	First king about whom anything definite is known (Note: Sources on Eric's parentage are contradictory. The 13th-century Icelandic saga Hervarar saga ok Heiðreks describes him as the son of Björn Eriksson, but Saxo Grammaticus instead names Olaf Eriksson as his father.)	Sigrid the Haughty (?) (2 children)	c. 945 – c. 995 (aged approx. 50) Attributed various wives and children in different sources
	Olof "Skötkonung" (Note: The by-name "Skötkonung" was a later invention, not attested before the 13th century. Its meaning is obscure and disputed but should probably be understood as skattkonung ("tax-king"), perhaps indicating that Olof paid tribute to another king, possibly the Danish king Sweyn Forkbeard. Alternatively, it might be interpretable as "treasure king", deriving from Olof being the first Swedish king to mint coins.)	c. 995 – c. 1022 (c. 27 years)	Son of Eric the Victorious	Estrid of the Obotrites (2 children)	c. 980 – c. 1022 (aged approx. 42)
	Anund Jacob; Anund Jakob	c. 1022 – 1050 (c. 28 years)	Son of Olof	Gunnhildr Sveinsdóttir (childless?)	c. 1008 – 1050 (aged approx. 42)
	Emund "the Old"; Emund den gamle	c. 1050 – 1060 (10 years)	Illegitimate son of Olof	Astrid Njalsdotter (?) (2 children)	Died 1060 Last king of the House of Munsö

=== House of Stenkil (1060–1125/1130) ===
Stenkil dynasty
Munsö dynasty

Portrait	Name	Reign	Succession	Marriage(s)	Life details
	Stenkil; Stenkil Ragnvaldsson	c. 1060 – 1066 (c. 6 years)	Possibly son-in-law of Emund (Note: Stenkil is traditionally held to have married "Ingamoder", a daughter of Emund the Old, but sources are too scanty to confidently establish whether this took place. He was also connected to the Munsö dynasty through his father Ragnvald Ulfsson being the nephew of Sigrid the Haughty, mother of Olof Skötkonung.)	"Ingamoder" (?) (at least 2 children)	Died c. 1066
	Eric and Eric; Erik och Erik (historicity disputed)	c. 1066 (?) (briefly)	Recorded in only one source (Note: Eric and Eric are recorded only by Adam of Bremen and are not included in any of the known medieval king lists on Swedish rulers, neither native Swedish lists nor Icelandic sources. Liljegren (2004) highlights their dubious history by describing them as "the most anonymous royal figures in Sweden's history" and further states that the period immediately after Stenkil appears to have lacked any real king, with "magnates [standing against] magnates".) as two pretenders who fought each other after Stenkil's death.	Nothing recorded	Nothing known (Note: Older tradition describes one of the Erics as a son of Stenkil ("Eric Stenkilsson") and the other as the pagan son of a daughter of Eric the Victorious ("Eric the Heathen"), though these assumptions cannot be substantiated by the historical record.)
	Halsten; Halsten Stenkilsson	c. 1066 – 1068 (c. 2 years)	Son of Stenkil	Unknown queen (at least 2 children)	Few life details known. Deposed c. 1068. Possibly later returned to rule as co-ruler with his (likely younger) brother Inge I.
	Anund "from Russia"; Anund Gårdske (historicity disputed)	c. 1068 – 1076 (?) (c. 8 years)	Recorded in only one source (Note: Anund Gårdske is recorded only by Adam of Bremen and is not included in any of the known medieval king lists on Swedish rulers, neither native Swedish lists nor Icelandic sources.) as elected king after Halsten's deposition	Nothing recorded	Few life details known; said to have come from Kievan Rus'. Deposed c. 1076.
	Håkan "the Red"; Håkan Röde	1070s (?)	Possibly great-grandson of Eric the Victorious	Nothing recorded	Few life details known. Different sources place Håkan either as the predecessor of Stenkil or Inge.
	Inge "the Elder"; Inge den äldre	c. 1078 – 1112 (c. 34 years)	Son of Stenkil. Seized power, either from Anund or Håkan.	Helena (4 children)	Died c. 1112 Ended the period of anarchy begun after Stenkil's death. Maybe deposed c. 1081–1083 before regaining the throne.
	Sweyn ("Blot-Sweyn"); Blot-Sven (historicity disputed)	c. 1081 – 1083 (c. 2 years)	Possibly son-in-law of Stenkil. Said to have usurped the throne.	Nothing recorded	Few life details known. Historicity disputed on account of poor source material. Either deposed or succeeded by his son.
	Eric (VIII) "Årsäll"; Erik Årsäll (historicity disputed)	c. 1083 (?) (briefly)	Possibly son of Sweyn, who some sources record him as succeeding	Nothing recorded	Few life details known. Historicity disputed on account of poor and contradictory sources. Deposed by Inge if historical.
	Philip; Filip Halstensson	c. 1100 – 1118 (c. 18 years)	Son of Halsten. Appears to have begun his reign as a co-ruler with Inge the Elder.	Ingegerd of Norway (childless)	Died 1118
	Inge "the Younger"; Inge (den yngre) Halstensson	c. 1118 – 1125/1130 (c. 7–12 years)	Son of Halsten. Possibly initially co-ruler with Philip.	Ulvhild Håkansdotter (childless)	Died c. 1130 Likely the last male-line member of Stenkil's dynasty.
	Ragnvald "Knaphövde"	1120s/1130s (?) (briefly?)	No known connection to previous kings. Recorded in Västgötalagen as the successor of Inge II and predecessor of Sverker I.	Nothing recorded	Few life details known

=== Houses of Sverker and Erik (1125/1130–1250) ===
Estridsen dynasty
Sverker dynasty
Erik dynasty
Bjälbo dynasty

Portrait	Name	Reign	Succession	Marriage(s)	Life details
	Magnus I "the Strong"; Magnus (den starke) Nilsson (status disputed)	c. 1125 – 1130 or c. 1130 – 1134 (c. 4–5 years)	Grandson of Inge the Elder. Attested only as a pretender in the Gesta Danorum; perhaps never recognized as king.	Richeza of Poland (2 children)	Died in 1134 Elected king but failed to establish his power; killed in 1134 at the Battle of Fotevik.
Non-contemporary depiction	Sverker I "the Elder"; Sverker den äldre	c. 1130 – 25 December 1156 (c. 26 years)	Either no previous royal connection or grandson of Sweyn. Elected in opposition to Magnus I.	Ulvhild Håkansdotter (at least 4 children); Richeza of Poland (1 child?)	Died 25 December 1156 Assassinated, allegedly by the pretender Magnus II.
	Eric (IX) "the Holy"; Erik (den helige) Jedvardsson	c. 1157 – 18 May 1160 (c. 3 years)	Cousin of Sverker I	Christina of Denmark (4 children)	c. 1120 – 18 May 1160 (aged approx. 40) Attempted to christianize Finland. Murdered by the pretender Magnus II and later canonized, becoming Sweden's patron saint.
	Magnus II; Magnus Henriksson	18 May 1160 – 1161 (1 year)	Great-grandson of Inge I. Seized power after murdering Eric IX.	Bridget Haraldsdotter (childless)	Died in 1161 Killed in battle against Charles VII.
	Charles (VII); Karl Sverkersson	c. 1157 – 12 April 1167 (c. 10 years; ruled all of Sweden from 1161 onwards)	Son of Sverker I. Initially ruled in Västergötland in opposition to Eric IX; later overthrew Magnus II.	Christina Hvide (at least 1 child)	1130 – 12 April 1167 (aged 37) Murdered by Canute I, who succeeded him as king.
	Canute I Knut Eriksson	12 April 1167 – 1196 (29 years)	Son of Eric IX. Seized power after murdering Charles VII.	Cecilia Johansdotter (name disputed) (5 children)	Before 1150 – 1196 (older than 46)
	Kol (status disputed)	1170s (several years)	Sons (?) of Sverker I. Ruled together in Östergötland, in opposition to Canute I.	Nothing recorded	Few life details known
	Boleslaw; Burislev (status disputed)	1170s (several years)	Sons (?) of Sverker I. Ruled together in Östergötland, in opposition to Canute I.	Nothing recorded	Few life details known
	Sverker II "the Younger"; Sverker (den yngre) Karlsson	1196 – 1208 (12 years)	Son of Charles VII	Benedicta Hvide (at least 1 child)	c. 1164 – 17 July 1210 (aged c. 46) Deposed after the Battle of Lena. Killed at the Battle of Gestilren while trying to retake the throne.
	Sverker II "the Younger"; Sverker (den yngre) Karlsson	1196 – 1208 (12 years)	Son of Charles VII	Ingegerd Birgersdotter (at least 1 child)	c. 1164 – 17 July 1210 (aged c. 46) Deposed after the Battle of Lena. Killed at the Battle of Gestilren while trying to retake the throne.
	Eric (X) "the Survivor"; Erik Knutsson	1208 – 10 April 1216 (8 years)	Son of Canute I. Seized power after defeating Sverker II in battle.	Rikissa of Denmark (5 children)	1180 – 10 April 1216 (aged c. 36)
	John I Johan Sverkersson	10 April 1216 – 10 March 1222 (5 years and 11 months)	Son of Sverker II	Unmarried and childless	1201 – 10 March 1222 (aged c. 21) Died of illness as the last male-line member of Sverker's dynasty.
	Eric (XI) "the Lisp and Lame"; Erik Eriksson	March 1222 – 1229 (7 years) (first reign)	Son of Eric X	Catherine Sunesdotter (childless)	1216 – 2 February 1250 (aged c. 34) Largely overshadowed by prominent statesmen. Deposed and in exile 1229–1234.
	Canute II "the Tall"; Knut Holmgersson	1229 – 1234 (5 years)	Relative of the House of Eric. Elected king after the deposition of Eric XI.	Unknown queen (at least 2 children)	Died 1234
	Eric (XI) "the Lisp and Lame"; Erik Eriksson	1234 – 2 February 1250 (16 years) (second reign)	Returned and regained power after Canute II's death	Catherine Sunesdotter (childless)	(see entry for previous reign)

=== House of Bjälbo (1250–1364) ===
Bjälbo dynasty
Estridsen dynasty
Wittelsbach dynasty

Portrait	Name	Arms	Reign	Succession	Marriage(s)	Life details
	Valdemar; Valdemar Birgersson		1250 – 22 July 1275 (25 years)	Grandson of Eric X and son of the prominent statesman Birger Jarl	Sophia of Denmark (6 children)	1239 – 26 December 1302 (aged c. 63) Deposed after losing the Battle of Hova (1275). Continued to try to regain parts of the kingdom before being imprisoned in 1288.
	Magnus III "Barnlock"; Magnus (Ladulås) Birgersson		22 July 1275 – 18 December 1290 (15 years, 4 months and 26 days)	Grandson of Eric X and son of the prominent statesman Birger Jarl. Seized power after defeating Valdemar in battle.	Helvig of Holstein (5 children)	Died 18 December 1290
	Birger; Birger Magnusson		18 December 1290 – March/April 1318 (28 years and 5/6 months)	Son of Magnus III	Martha of Denmark (4 children)	1280 – 31 May 1321 (aged c. 41) Deposed and forced into exile by supporters of his brother Eric in 1318.
Regency of Duchess Ingeborg (March/April 1318 – 8 July 1319)
	Magnus IV; Magnus Eriksson		8 July 1319 – 15 February 1364 (44 years, 7 months and 7 days)	Grandson of Magnus III	Blanche of Namur (5 children)	c. 1316 – 1 December 1374 (aged c. 58) Also king of Norway (1319–1355). Deposed in favor of Albert and imprisoned until 1371; thereafter lived in exile in Norway.
	Eric (XII); Erik Magnusson		17 October 1356 – 20 June 1359 (2 years, 8 months and 3 days)	Son of Magnus IV. Initially ruled in opposition to his father; became co-ruler following reconciliation in 1359.	Beatrice of Bavaria (childless)	In or before 1339 – 20 June 1359 (aged at least 20)
	Håkan; Håkan Magnusson		15 February 1362 – 15 February 1364 (2 years)	Son of Magnus IV, co-ruler with his father	Margaret of Denmark (ruling queen 1389–1412) (1 child)	1340 – 11 September 1380 (aged c. 40) Also king of Norway (1343–1380). Deposed in favor of Albert, tried to reclaim Sweden until his defeat at the Siege of Stockholm in 1371.

=== House of Mecklenburg (1364–1389) ===
Portrait	Name	Arms	Reign	Succession	Marriage(s)	Life details
	Albert of Mecklenburg; Albrekt av Mecklenburg		15 February 1364 – 24 February 1389 (25 years and 9 days)	Great-grandson of Magnus III of Sweden	Richardis of Schwerin (2 children); Agnes of Brunswick-Lüneburg (1 child)	c. 1340 – 1 April 1412 (aged c. 72) Also Duke of Mecklenburg (1384–1412). Defeated by Margaret at the Battle of Åsle and then deposed.

=== Monarchs and regents during the Kalmar Union (1389–1523) ===
Estridsen dynasty
Wittelsbach dynasty
Oldenburg dynasty
Bjälbo dynasty
Vasa dynasty

Portrait	Name	Arms	Reign	Succession	Marriage(s)	Life details
	Margaret; Margareta Valdemarsdotter		24 February 1389 – 28 October 1412 (23 years, 8 months and 26 days)	Queen of Denmark and Norway; widow of Håkan Magnusson. Also a descendant of Eric X of Sweden. Defeated Albert with support from the Swedish nobility.	Håkan Magnusson (king 1362–1364) (1 child)	March 1353 – 28 October 1412 (aged 59) Also queen of Denmark and Norway as ruler of the Kalmar Union. Did not remarry after Håkan's death. Died suddenly of plague in 1412.
	Eric (XIII) of Pomerania; Erik av Pommern		23 July 1396 – 24 September 1439 (43 years, 2 months and 1 day)	Grand-nephew, designated heir, and initially co-ruler of Margaret. Also a descendant of Magnus III of Sweden. (Note: Eric of Pomerania was the son of Maria of Mecklenburg-Schwerin, a granddaughter of Euphemia of Sweden, who in turn was a granddaughter of Magnus III.)	Philippa of England (childless); Cecilia (childless)	1381/1382 – 3 May 1459 (aged 76–78) Also king of Denmark and Norway as ruler of the Kalmar Union. Deposed in Sweden twice (1434–1435 and 1436); regained power until deposed in all three kingdoms in 1439.
Regency of Charles Knutsson Bonde (later King Charles VIII; October 1438 – Autumn 1440)
	Christopher of Bavaria; Kristofer av Bayern		Autumn 1441 – 6 January 1448 (6 years and a few months)	Nephew of Eric XIII	Dorothea of Brandenburg (childless)	26 February 1416 – 6 January 1448 (aged 31) Also king of Denmark and Norway as ruler of the Kalmar Union
Regency of Bengt Jönsson Oxenstierna and Nils Jönsson Oxenstierna (January – 20 June 1448)
	Charles (VIII); Karl Knutsson Bonde		20 June 1448 – 24 February 1457 (8 years, 8 months and 4 days) (first reign)	Swedish nobleman, elected king in Sweden after Christopher's death in opposition to the union monarchs	Birgitta Turesdotter (2 children); Catherine Karlsdotter (8 children); Christina Abrahamsdotter (2 children)	Died 15 May 1470 Also king of Norway (1449–1450). Deposed twice (1457–1464 and 1465–1467), both times due to the influence of Archbishop Jöns Bengtsson Oxenstierna.
First regency of Jöns Bengtsson Oxenstierna and Erik Axelsson Tott (March – 23 June 1457)
	Christian I Kristian I		23 June 1457 – 23 June 1464 (7 years)	Husband of Dorothea of Brandenburg, widow of Christopher. Also a descendant of Magnus III of Sweden. Accepted as king in Sweden after the deposition of Charles VIII.	Dorothea of Brandenburg (5 children)	February 1426 – 21 May 1481 (aged 55) Also king of Denmark and Norway as ruler of the Kalmar Union. Deposed in Sweden in 1464.
	Charles (VIII); Karl Knutsson Bonde		9 August 1464 – 30 January 1465 (5 months and 21 days) (second reign)	Returned to power after the deposition of Christian I	(see entry for previous reign)	(see entry for previous reign)
Regency of Kettil Karlsson Vasa (26 December 1464 – 11 August 1465)
Second regency of Jöns Bengtsson Oxenstierna (11 August 1465 – 18 October 1466)
Second regency of Erik Axelsson Tott (18 October 1466 – 12 November 1467)
	Charles (VIII); Karl Knutsson Bonde		12 November 1467 – 15 May 1470 (2 years, 6 months and 3 days) (third reign)	Returned to power with the support of regent Erik Axelsson Tott	(see entry for previous reign)	(see entry for previous reign)
First regency of Sten Sture the Elder (16 May 1470 – 6 October 1497)
	John II; Johan II / Hans		6 October 1497 – 1 August 1501 (3 years, 9 months and 26 days)	Son of Christian I. Accepted as king in Sweden after already having reigned in Denmark and Norway for twenty years.	Christina of Saxony (5 children)	8 July 1455 – 20 February 1513 (aged 57) Also king of Denmark and Norway as ruler of the Kalmar Union. Deposed in Sweden in favor of Sten Sture the Elder's return as regent.
Second regency of Sten Sture the Elder (12 November 1501 – 14 December 1503)
Regency of Svante Nilsson (21 January 1504 – 31 December 1511/2 January 1512)
Regency of Eric Trolle (January – 23 July 1512)
Regency of Sten Sture the Younger (23 July 1512 – 3 February 1520)
	Christian II "the Tyrant"; Kristian II		1 November 1520 – 23 August 1521 (9 months and 22 days)	Son of John II. Accepted as king in Sweden after conquering the country from regent Sten Sture the Younger.	Isabella of Austria (6 children)	2 July 1481 – 25 January 1559 (aged 77) Also king of Denmark and Norway as ruler of the Kalmar Union. Deposed following the Stockholm Bloodbath. Later also deposed in Denmark and Norway.
Regency of Gustav Vasa (later King Gustav I; 23 August 1521 – 6 June 1523)

=== House of Vasa (1523–1654) ===
Vasa dynasty
Wittelsbach dynasty
Oldenburg dynasty

Portrait	Name	Arms	Reign (Note: Sweden changed from the Julian calendar to the Gregorian calendar (the two calendars differ by 11 days) in 1753. This list consistently uses the dates used at the time.)	Succession	Marriage(s)	Life details	Cypher
	Gustav I Gustav Vasa	(Note: Gustav I introduced a crown above the arms, based on its use in the arms of regent Sten Sture the Younger.)	6 June 1523 – 29 September 1560 (37 years, 3 months and 23 days)	Previously regent, elected king after the Swedish War of Liberation (Note: Though the Swedish monarchy was not hereditary before his reign, Gustav I was also distantly related to medieval Swedish royalty since he was a matrilineal descendant of Birger Jarl, the father of kings Valdemar and Magnus III. Some genealogists claim that he was also a descendant of kings Eric IX and Sverker II.)	Catherine of Saxe-Lauenburg (1 child); Margaret Leijonhufvud (10 children); Catherine Stenbock (childless)	12 May 1496 – 29 September 1560 (aged 64)	— (Note: Royal cyphers, also known as monograms, began being used by monarchs throughout Europe in the 16th century. The first Swedish king known to have used a monogram is Eric XIV. The monograms used by Eric XIV and his successor John III were simple, consisting only of their initials and "R" (rex), but monograms grew more elaborate and distinct over time.)
	Eric XIV; Erik XIV	(Note: Gustav I introduced a crown above the arms, based on its use in the arms of regent Sten Sture the Younger.)	29 September 1560 – 26 January 1569 (8 years, 3 months and 28 days)	Son of Gustav I	Karin Månsdotter (5 children)	13 December 1533 – 26 February 1577 (aged 43) Deposed and later poisoned, perhaps by his brother John III.	
	John III; Johan III	(Note: Heraldic supporters were added to the royal arms in the time of John III. They also appear on the grave monument of Gustav I but this monument was constructed in John III's reign.)	26 January 1569 – 17 November 1592 (23 years, 9 months and 22 days)	Son of Gustav I	Catherine Jagiellon (3 children); Gunilla Bielke (1 child)	20 December 1537 – 17 November 1592 (aged 54)	
	Sigismund	(Note: Heraldic supporters were added to the royal arms in the time of John III. They also appear on the grave monument of Gustav I but this monument was constructed in John III's reign.)	17 November 1592 – 24 July 1599 (6 years, 8 months and 7 days)	Son of John III	Anne of Austria (5 children); Constance of Austria (7 children)	20 June 1566 – 19 April 1632 (aged 65) Deposed after the war against Sigismund. Also king of Poland 1587–1632.	
Regency of Duke Charles (later King Charles IX; 24 July 1599 – 22 March 1604)
	Charles IX; Karl IX		22 March 1604 – 30 October 1611 (7 years, 7 months and 8 days)	Son of Gustav I, proclaimed king after serving as regent for five years	Maria of the Palatinate (6 children)	4 October 1550 – 30 October 1611 (aged 61)	— (Note: No monogram attested.)
	Charles IX; Karl IX		22 March 1604 – 30 October 1611 (7 years, 7 months and 8 days)	Son of Gustav I, proclaimed king after serving as regent for five years	Christina of Holstein-Gottorp (4 children)	4 October 1550 – 30 October 1611 (aged 61)	—
	Gustav II Adolf (Gustavus Adolphus)		30 October 1611 – 6 November 1632 (21 years and 7 days)	Son of Charles IX	Maria Eleonora of Brandenburg (2 children)	9 December 1594 – 6 November 1632 (aged 37) Killed at the Battle of Lützen in 1632	
	Christina; Kristina		6 November 1632 – 6 June 1654 (21 years and 7 months)	Daughter of Gustav II Adolf	Unmarried and childless	7 December 1626 – 9 April 1689 (aged 62) Abdicated and retired to Rome.	

=== House of Palatinate-Zweibrücken (1654–1720) ===
Wittelsbach dynasty
Oldenburg dynasty

Portrait	Name	Arms	Reign	Succession	Marriage(s)	Life details	Cypher
	Charles X Gustav; Karl X Gustav		6 June 1654 – 13 February 1660 (5 years, 8 months and 7 days)	Son of Catherine of Sweden, a daughter of Charles IX	Hedwig Eleonora of Holstein-Gottorp (1 child)	8 November 1622 – 13 February 1660 (aged 37)	
	Charles XI; Karl XI		13 February 1660 – 5 April 1697 (37 years, 1 month and 23 days)	Son of Charles X Gustav	Ulrika Eleonora of Denmark (7 children)	24 November 1655 – 5 April 1697 (aged 41)	
	Charles XII; Karl XII		5 April 1697 – 30 November 1718 (21 years, 7 months and 25 days)	Son of Charles XI	Unmarried and childless	17 June 1682 – 30 November 1718 (aged 36) Killed in battle against Denmark–Norway during the siege of Fredriksten in 1718.	
Regency of Princess Ulrika Eleonora (later Queen Ulrika Eleonora; 30 November 1718 – 23 January 1719)
	Ulrika Eleonora		23 January 1719 – 24 March 1720 (1 year, 2 months and 1 day)	Daughter of Charles XI, elected as successor of her childless brother	Frederick of Hesse-Cassel (king 1720–1751) (childless)	23 January 1688 – 24 November 1741 (aged 53) Abdicated in favor of her husband in 1720; thereafter consort until her death.	

=== House of Hesse (1720–1751) ===
Wittelsbach dynasty

Portrait	Name	Arms	Reign	Succession	Marriage(s)	Life details	Cypher
	Frederick I Fredrik I		24 March 1720 – 25 March 1751 (31 years and 1 day)	Husband and designated successor of Ulrika Eleonora	Luise Dorothea of Prussia (childless)	18 April 1676 – 25 March 1751 (aged 74)	
	Frederick I Fredrik I		24 March 1720 – 25 March 1751 (31 years and 1 day)	Husband and designated successor of Ulrika Eleonora	Ulrika Eleonora (ruling queen 1719–1720) (childless)	18 April 1676 – 25 March 1751 (aged 74)	

=== House of Holstein-Gottorp (1751–1818) ===
Oldenburg dynasty

Portrait	Name	Arms	Reign	Succession	Marriage(s)	Life details	Cypher
	Adolf Frederick; Adolf Fredrik		25 March 1751 – 12 February 1771 (19 years, 10 months and 7 days)	Great-great-great-grandson of Charles IX; (Note: Adolf Frederick's mother Albertina Frederica was a great-granddaughter of Catherine of Sweden, a daughter of Charles IX.) elected as heir to the throne in 1743	Louisa Ulrika of Prussia (4 children)	3 May 1710 – 12 February 1771 (aged 60) Originally Prince-Bishop of Lübeck (1727–1750).	
	Gustav III	(Note: The addition of a mantle and pavilion to the arms dates to the middle of the 18th century.)	12 February 1771 – 29 March 1792 (21 years, 1 month and 17 days)	Son of Adolf Frederick	Sophia Magdalena of Denmark (2 children)	13 January 1746 – 29 March 1792 (aged 46) Assassinated in 1792.	
	Gustav IV Adolf		29 March 1792 – 10 May 1809 (17 years, 1 month and 11 days)	Son of Gustav III	Frederica of Baden (5 children)	1 November 1778 – 7 February 1837 (aged 58) Deposed after defeat in the Finnish War; died in exile in Switzerland. (Note: The so-called Gustavians worked unsuccessfully in the decades that followed Gustav IV Adolf's deposition to restore his line to the throne; his son Gustav, Prince of Vasa (1799–1877), maintained his claim to the Swedish throne and protested the coronations of Oscar I and Charles XV. Gustav's daughter Carola of Vasa (1833–1902), who died childless, was the last member of the Swedish branch of the House of Holstein-Gottorp. The modern Swedish royal family are Gustav IV Adolf's seniormost living descendants through the marriage between his great-granddaughter Victoria of Baden and Gustaf V.)	
Regency of Duke Charles (later King Charles XIII; 10 May – 6 June 1809)
	Charles XIII; Karl XIII		6 June 1809 – 5 February 1818 (8 years, 7 months and 30 days)	Son of Adolf Frederick, elected king by the Riksdag of the Estates after a brief tenure as regent	Hedvig Elisabeth Charlotte of Holstein-Gottorp (2 children, died in infancy)	26 September 1748 – 5 February 1818 (aged 69) Also became king of Norway in 1814	

=== House of Bernadotte (1818–present) ===
Bernadotte dynasty

Portrait	Name	Arms	Reign	Succession	Marriage(s)	Life details	Cypher
	Charles XIV John; Karl XIV Johan		5 February 1818 – 8 March 1844 (26 years, 1 month and 3 days)	Elected in 1810 as heir to the childless Charles XIII by the Riksdag of the Estates and then adopted by Charles XIII (Note: Although Charles XIV John was adopted by Charles XIII and the Bernadotte monarchs have since the accession of Gustaf VI Adolf in 1950 also been the senior genealogical descendants of the Holstein-Gottorp kings, the accession of Charles XIV John marked the first new dynastic line since the accession of Gustav I nearly 300 years prior.)	Désirée Clary (1 child)	26 January 1763 – 8 March 1844 (aged 81) As Jean-Baptiste Jules Bernadotte a French general, then Marshal of the Empire and Prince of Pontecorvo (1806–1810).	
	Oscar I		8 March 1844 – 8 July 1859 (15 years and 4 months)	Son of Charles XIV John	Josephine of Leuchtenberg (5 children)	4 July 1799 – 8 July 1859 (aged 60)	
	Charles XV; Karl XV		8 July 1859 – 18 September 1872 (13 years, 2 months and 10 days)	Son of Oscar I	Louise of the Netherlands (2 children)	3 May 1826 – 18 September 1872 (aged 46) First monarch of the House of Bernadotte to be born in Sweden.	
	Oscar II		18 September 1872 – 8 December 1907 (35 years, 2 months and 20 days)	Son of Oscar I	Sophia of Nassau (4 children)	21 January 1829 – 8 December 1907 (aged 78) Last Swedish king to also be king of Norway (until 1905).	
	Gustaf V		8 December 1907 – 29 October 1950 (42 years, 10 months and 21 days)	Son of Oscar II	Victoria of Baden (3 children)	16 June 1858 – 29 October 1950 (aged 92) The marriage to Victoria of Baden, a great-granddaughter of Gustaf IV Adolf, genealogically united the House of Bernadotte with the former royal line.	
	Gustaf VI Adolf		29 October 1950 – 15 September 1973 (22 years, 10 months and 17 days)	Son of Gustaf V (Note: In the female line also great-great-grandson of Gustav IV Adolf through Victoria of Baden, granddaughter of Gustav IV Adolf's daughter Sophie Vilhelmina.)	Margaret of Connaught (5 children); Louise Mountbatten (1 stillborn child)	11 November 1882 – 15 September 1973 (aged 90)	
	Carl XVI Gustaf		15 September 1973 – present (53 years, 2 months and 7 days)	Grandson of Gustaf VI Adolf	Silvia Sommerlath (3 children)	Born 30 April 1946 (age 80) The longest reigning monarch in Swedish history	

== See also ==
- Family tree of Swedish monarchs
- Succession to the Swedish throne
- List of Swedish royal consorts
- Coronation of the Swedish monarch
- Regalia of Sweden
- Style of the Swedish sovereign
- Royal mottos of Swedish monarchs
- Orders of chivalry of Sweden
- King in Council (Sweden)
- Council of State (Sweden)
- Privy Council of Sweden
- Lists of office-holders
