= King of the Goths =

Title previously used by Swedish and Danish monarchs

The title of King of the Goths (Swedish: Götes konung; Danish: Goternes konge; Latin: gothorum rex) was for many centuries borne by both the kings of Sweden and the kings of Denmark.

In the Swedish case, the reference is to Götaland (land of the Geats); in the Danish case, to the island of Gotland (land of the Gutes).

== Migration period ==
Jordanes' Getica has a number of legendary kings of the Goths predating the 4th century: Berig (the leader of the original Goths during their migration from Scandza to Oium), and Filimer son of Gadaric ("about the fifth since Berig"). A Gothic leader named Cniva is recorded for the Battle of Abritus of 250.

Attila the Hun styled himself "Attila, Descendant of the Great Nimrod. Nurtured in Engaddi. By the grace of God, King of the Huns, the Goths, the Danes, and the Medes. The Dread of the World".

== Swedish title ==
A papal letter from about 1100 is directed to two Swedish kings—Inge the Elder and Halsten or Håkan Röde (only the initials are given)—as Kings of the Visigoths, which has been interpreted as meaning that they only ruled over Västergötland, and had lost control over the rest of the country.

In a papal letter dated 5 September 1164, King Karl Sverkersson (c. 1130–67; reigned 1161–1167) was addressed as rex Sweorum et Gothorum.

The first Swedish king to regularly use the title was King Magnus Ladulås, particularly after he had in c. 1278 had his final win over his deposed brother Valdemar who had hitherto held lands of Västergötland. First Sveriges och Götes Konung up to later decades of Gustav Vasa, then Sveriges, Götes och Vendes Konung, was used in official documentation. Between 1814 and 1905 Sveriges, Norges, Götes och Vendes Konung was used, adding Norway. Sveriges, Götes och Vendes Konung was used again from 1905 up to the accession of Carl XVI Gustaf in 1973, who was the first monarch officially proclaimed Sveriges Konung ("King of Sweden") and nothing else.

== Danish title ==
Coat of arms representing the Danish monarchs' title as 'King of the Goths'. Today it is a common symbol of Jutland.

The first Danish king to use the title was Valdemar IV (reigned 1340 to 1375), who adopted it in 1362 after conquering Gotland the previous year. The Danish kings continued to use the title over the next six hundred years until 1972, when Queen Margrethe II succeeded. She abandoned the use of all her predecessors' titles except her title as 'Denmark's Queen', which is the royal style today.

First documented 1449, the arms of the Danish monarchs contained until 1972 a subcoat representing the title King of the Goths: on gold, a blue heraldic leopard above nine red heraldic hearts. Originally derived from the arms of the dukes of Halland which again was derived from the Danish arms. This symbol is consequently unrelated to Gotland's arms featuring the Agnus Dei, although the latter symbol was also formerly represented in the arms of Denmark.

== Sources ==
- Rozn, Val (2004). "Denmark". The Titles of European Rulers. Archived from the original on 21 October 2009.
- Rozn, Val (2004). "Sweden". The Titles of European Rulers. Archived from the original on 22 October 2009.
