= Stenkilsson =

Stenkilsson is a surname. Notable people with the surname include:

- Eric Stenkilsson, contender for the Swedish kingship 1066–67
- Halsten Stenkilsson, became king of Sweden after his father Stenkil's death in 1066
- Inge the Elder, Inge Stenkilsson (died c. 1100), King of Sweden
