= Anund (disambiguation) =

Anund, also known as Bröt-Anund, was a semi-legendary Swedish king who reigned in the mid-seventh century.

Anund may also refer to:

- Anund Uppsale, legendary Swedish king
- Anund Jacob of Sweden (died c. 1050), King of Sweden from 1022
- Anund from Russia, Swedish king around 1070
- Anund, Swedish prince around 1056, son of King Emund the Old
