= Astrid of Sweden (disambiguation) =

Astrid of Sweden (1905–1935) was the queen consort of Leopold III, King of the Belgians, and granddaughter of Oscar II of Sweden.

Astrid of Sweden may also refer to:

- Astrid Olofsdotter (d. 1035), queen consort of Olaf II, King of Norway, and eldest daughter of Olaf the Swede, King of Sweden
- Astrid Njalsdotter (d. c. 1060), possible queen consort of Emund the Old, King of Sweden

== See also ==
- Princess Astrid (disambiguation)
