= Astrid Njalsdotter =

Norwegian noblewoman

Astrid Njalsdotter (or Ástríðr Njálsdóttir) of Skjalgaätten was a Norwegian noblewoman who married Ragnvald the Old and became the ancestress of the Swedish Stenkil dynasty (c. 1060 – c. 1125). She is sometimes assumed to have been a Swedish queen, though the evidence is inconclusive.

== Dynastic ancestress ==
The only source available for Astrid is Hervarar saga ok Heiðreks, which says that she was the daughter of Njal Finnsson from Halogaland. From other Norse sources it appears that Njal Finnsson was the son of Gunhild Halvdansdotter of the Skjalga family, a cognatic descendant of Harald Fairhair, the first king of Norway and an alleged scion of the Yngling dynasty. According to the saga, she gave birth to Stenkil (d. 1066) who became a Jarl in Sweden and later inherited the kingdom in c. 1060. Since her grandsons, the Swedish kings Halsten and Inge the Elder, may have been born around 1050–1060, her marriage probably took place in the 1020s or 1030s. Nothing is known about the time when she died.

Her husband Ragnvald the Old is otherwise unknown. In older historiography it was common to identify him with Ragnvald Ulfsson, a Swedish or Geatic Jarl who served under King Olof Skötkonung in the early 11th century. According to the Norse sagas, Ragnvald Ulfsson was forced to flee Sweden after a dispute with the king, and was eventually established as Jarl of Staraya Ladoga. However, this Ragnvald was married to the Norwegian princess Ingeborg Tryggvasdotter and the father of Ulf and Eilif, and is nowhere associated with Stenkil. A second marriage of Ragnvald to Astrid is therefore mere guesswork.

== Possible queenship ==
The German ecclesiastic historian Adam of Bremen writes that Stenkil was either the stepson (privignus) or nephew (nepos) of the previous Swedish ruler Emund the Old (c. 1050-c. 1060). On the basis of this, it has sometimes been assumed that Astrid Njalsdotter was first married to Ragnvald and then with Emund, whose spouse is otherwise unknown. This would help explain the smoothness of the dynastic succession in c. 1060, when the Viking Age family of rulers died out in the male line. Nevertheless, Hervarar saga ok Heiðreks says that Stenkil inherited the throne through his wife, who was the daughter of Emund. Modern historians therefore tend to doubt this hypothesis.

== Literature ==
- Astrid Nialsdotter (in Swedish)
- Personakt för Astrid Nialsdotter (in Swedish)
- http://www.progressus.se/mormor_morfar/tree/PS08/PS08_314.HTML%5B‍%5D (in Swedish)
- Elgenstierna, Gustaf (1925–1936), Den introducerade svenska adelns ättartavlor, Vol. I-IX (in Swedish).
- Ohlmarks, Åke (1973), Alla Sveriges drottningar (All the queens of Sweden; in Swedish). Stockholm: Gebers.

Astrid Njalsdotter Died: c. 1060
Swedish royalty
Preceded by Gunhild	(possibly) Queen consort of Sweden c. 1050–c. 1060	Succeeded by Unknown; Next known consort: Gyla
