= Emund the Old =

King of Sweden c.1050–1060

King of Sweden
- Reign: c. 1050 – c. 1060
- Predecessor: Anund Jakob
- Successor: Stenkil
- Died: c. 1060
- Spouse: Astrid Njalsdotter (?)
- Issue: Anund; Ingamoder, Queen of Sweden
- House: Munsö
- Father: Olof Skötkonung
- Mother: Edla

Emund the Old (Old Norse: Eymundr gamli; Old Swedish: Æmunðær gamlæ, Æmunðær gammal, Æmunðær slemæ; Swedish: Emund den gamle; died c. 1060) was King of Sweden from c. 1050 to c. 1060. His short reign was characterised by disputes with the Archbishopric of Bremen over church policies, and a historically debated delimitation of the Swedish-Danish border.

== Way to the throne ==
Emund was the son of Olof Skötkonung, the first Christian ruler of Sweden. His mother was a co-wife, Edla, daughter of a Slavic chief from the southern coast of the Baltic Sea. He had two uterine sisters called Astrid and Holmfrid. His half-siblings, born by Olof's legitimate Queen Estrid of the Obotrites, were Anund Jacob and Ingegerd. According to the 13th-century historian Snorri Sturluson, Estrid was ill-tempered and treated her stepchildren poorly. King Olof later sent Emund to be raised with his mother's Slavic family. While staying there he failed to hold on to the Christian religion.

Olof was succeeded by his other son Anund Jacob, who however did not have any known sons of his own. Snorri relates that Emund was ruling in Sigtuna, an important center in the Swedish realm, by 1035. However, other sources show that Anund Jacob was still alive then; the names Anund and Emund might have been mixed up. The German ecclesiastical chronicler Adam of Bremen, in his Gesta Hammaburgensis Ecclesiae Pontificum (Deeds of Bishops of the Hamburg Church), says that Anund Jacob died in or shortly after 1049 and was succeeded by Emund; there is nothing to suggest that the succession was irregular.

== Conflict with Bremen ==
Our only near-contemporary source for Emund's reign is Adam of Bremen, who paints a very negative picture of the new ruler. This is mainly due to the self-willed attitude of Emund vis-à-vis the Archdiocese of Bremen. Adam relates that Emund was baptised but cared very little for the Christian faith. He also gives Emund the cognomen pessimus (worst), which is later reflected by the short chronicle of the Westrogothic law (c. 1240) which likewise knows the king as Slemme, the bad. The Westrogothic law states that Emund was a disagreeable man when wanting to pursue a goal.

The dispute with Bremen was triggered by Emund's insistence on maintaining a bishop called Osmundus. Originally a protégé of the Norwegian-based missionary Sigfrid, Osmundus had been raised at a school in Bremen but failed to be ordained bishop by the Pope. Eventually he was ordained by the Polish archbishop of Gniezno and proceeded to Sweden where he won the confidence of King Emund. In the mid-1050s the Archbishop of Bremen sent envoys to Sweden, headed by Adalvard the Elder who was intended as the new bishop. The delegation was highly offended when encountering Osmundus who sported the habits of an archbishop and "seduced the still recently converted wild peoples through incorrect education in our faith". On Osmundus' insistence, Emund turned the envoys away from an assembly. However, the Swedish magnate Stenkil, a relation of the king, escorted the delegation on its way back.

== Time of calamities ==
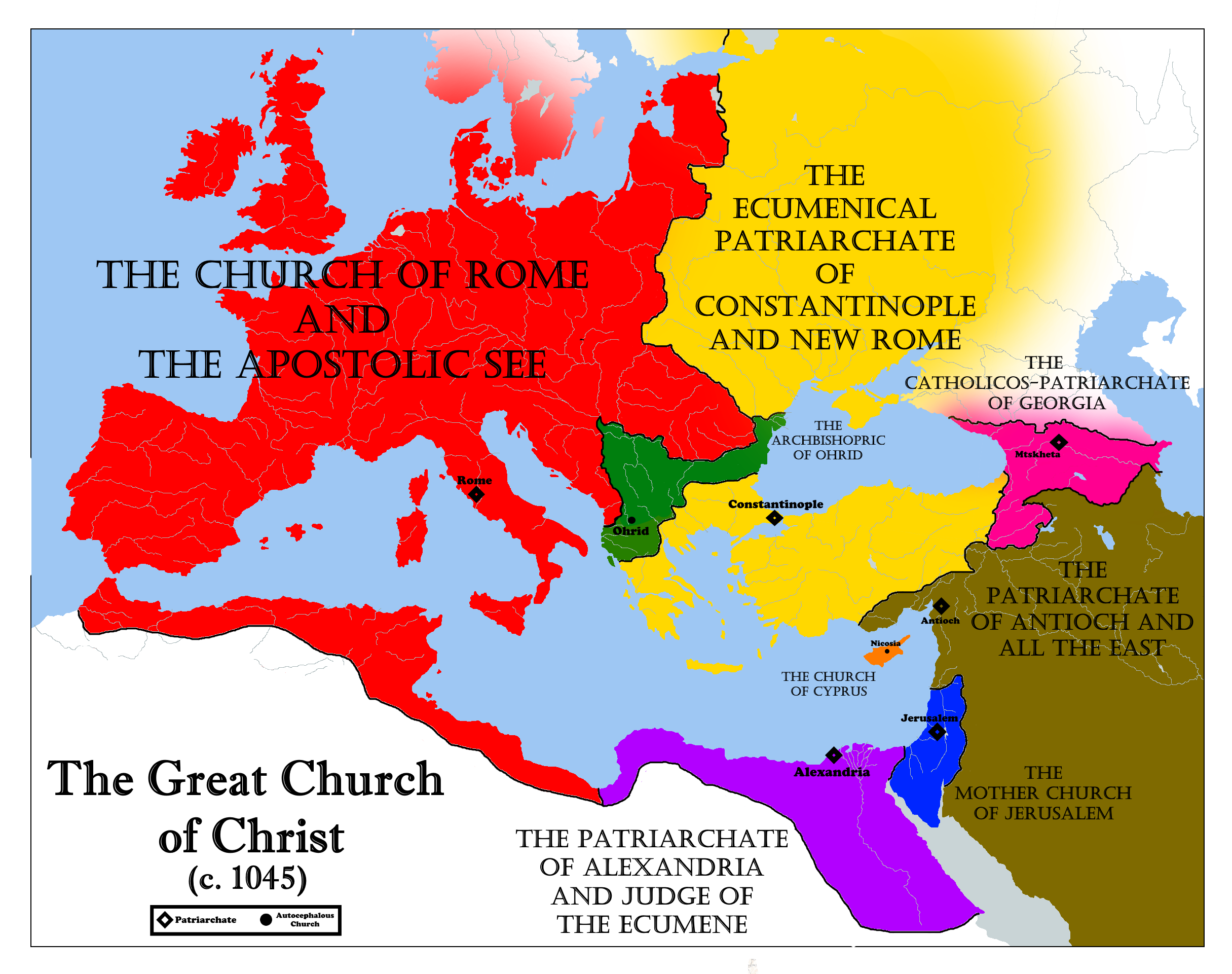
Map of the Great Church of Christ during King Emund's time

Some time after the schism, King Emund dispatched his son Anund with an army "in order to expand the realm". The Viking expedition crossed the sea and came, according to Adam, to Terra Feminarum, the Land of Women. Adam places this somewhere in Scythia. Modern scholars have assumed that the term alludes to Kvenland which was probably situated to the east of the Gulf of Bothnia in present-day Finland (Kven could have been mixed up with the Nordic word kvinna, woman). "The women", says Adam, "immediately mixed poison in the springwater, and in that way brought death to the king himself and his army." The passage implies that Anund bore the title of king together with his father.

The military disaster was paired with a severe drought and failed harvests. This crop failure can be dated to 1056 from other sources. Allegedly, the calamities caused the Swedes to turn to the Archbishop of Bremen and ask to receive Adalvard back as Bremen-appointed bishop. Adalvard duly arrived to Sweden where he devoted his efforts to the conversion of Värmland towards the border of Norway. Osmundus appears to have submitted to Adalvard in the end, but left Sweden for England some time before 1066. It has been assumed on very loose grounds that he was the same person as Åsmund Kåresson, a prominent carver of runic inscriptions in Uppland. One of the latter's inscriptions includes the passage "Åsmund Kåresson carved runes right. Then sat Emund". There has been much speculation that this refers to Emund sitting on the throne.

== Delimitation of the border ==
Little is known about the relationship between Sweden and its Nordic neighbours in King Emund's time. He may have continued his brother Anund Jacob's support for the Danish king Sweyn Estridsen against Harald Hardrada of Norway. A memorandum about an early delimitation of the Swedish-Danish border has been preserved in a large number of medieval Swedish manuscripts. The text states that "Emund Slemme was the King in Uppsala, and Sweyn Forkbeard in Denmark. They placed boundary-marks between Sweden [Sueriki] and Denmark. Now is enumerated Ragnvalde of Tiundaland, Botvid of Hälsingland, Bote of Fjärdhundraland, Grimalde of Östergötland, Tole and Tote and Tokke of Jutland, Gunkil of Sjaelland, Dan of Scania, Grimulf of Grimeton in Halland. They placed six stones between the two kingdoms. The first stone stands in Snutruase, the second in Danabäck, the third one is Kinna sten, the fourth in Uraksnaes, the fifth Vita sten, the sixth is Brömse sten between Blekinge and Möre." The memorandum is followed by a story about a meeting between the three Nordic kings on Danaholmen where the Danish king held the bridle of the Swedish king's horse, while the Norwegian king held his stirrups, thus seemingly acknowledging the precedence of the Uppsala king.

In older historiography it was usually assumed that the province of Blekinge was transferred from Sweden to Denmark at this occasion. A late 9th-century source alleges that Blekinge belonged to the Swedes at that time, while medieval sources make clear that it belonged to Denmark. Modern scholarship has questioned this, since there is even doubt if Blekinge was considered Danish in the 1060s. Moreover, the veracity of the memorandum has been put into doubt by Peter Sawyer on various grounds. Emund the Old and Sweyn Forkbeard were not contemporaries (though the king at the time was another Sweyn, Sweyn Estridsen [1047–1074]), and some particularities might fit High medieval conditions better. According to Sawyer the memorandum may have been authored by Danish people in the first half of the 13th century, in order to prove the early origins of the Danish claims to Halland and Blekinge. Some other historians have nevertheless defended the genuine character of the text and dated it to c. 1050.

== Family and succession ==
Emund's wife is not explicitly mentioned in the sources. Through a combination of information from the Hervarar saga and Adam of Bremen, it has sometimes been assumed that he was married to Astrid Njalsdotter of Skjalgaätten (d. 1060). Astrid was the daughter of Norwegian nobleman Nial Finnsson (d. 1011), son of Gunhild Halvdansdotter of the Skjalga family in Hålogaland, Norway. Emund sired two known children with his consort: Anund who died before his father, and a daughter, whose name is not known but who was the Queen Consort of King Stenkil of Sweden and the mother of two more Swedish kings, Inge I and Halsten.

The cognomen "Gamle" is known from Adam of Bremen, although he mistakes it as a proper name and mentions in one episode a "King Gamle" when it is in fact Emund. The name means "old" and could signify that he was old when he became king or that he was the older brother to his predecessor Anund Jakob. Emund was the last king of the ancient royal house of the Swedes (sometimes known in modern history writing as the House of Munsö). He is known to have been alive as late as the summer of 1060, and probably died shortly after. Adam of Bremen relates in his work that Emund was succeeded by his "nephew or stepson", in fact probably son-in law, Stenkil. With him began a new dynasty that would last until the 1120s.

The Hervarar saga (13th century) says that Emund was king only a short time:

Eymundr hét annarr sonr Óláfs sænska, er konungdóm tók eptir bróður sinn. Um hans daga heldu Svíar illa kristnina. Eymundr var litla hríð konungr.

Olaf the Swede had another son called Eymund, who came to the throne after his brother. In his day the Swedes neglected the Christian religion, but he was King for only a short time.

== Other sources ==
- Sawyer, Peter (1997), The Oxford Illustrated History of the Vikings. Oxford: Oxford University Press.
- Ohlmarks, Åke (1973), Alla Sveriges drottningar. Stockholm: Gebers.

Emund the Old House of Munsö Born: 995 Died: 1060
Regnal titles
Preceded by Anund Jacob	King of Sweden; 1050–1060	Succeeded by Stenkil
