= Stora Levene =

- Location within Västra Götaland Location within Sweden
- Coordinates: 58°20′N 12°55′E
- Country: Sweden
- Province: Västergötland
- County: Västra Götaland County
- Municipality: Vara Municipality

Area
  - Total: 1.01 km^{2} (0.39 sq mi)

Population (31 December 2010)
  - Total: 761
  - Density: 756/km^{2} (1,960/sq mi)
- Time zone: UTC+1 (CET)
  - Summer (DST): UTC+2 (CEST)
- Climate: Cfb

Stora Levene (Swedish pronunciation: [ˈstǔːra ˈlêːvɛnɛ]) is a locality situated in Vara Municipality, Västra Götaland County, Sweden with 761 inhabitants in 2010.

According to a regnal list appended to the Westrogothic law, two Swedish kings in the 11th century, Håkan the Red and Stenkil, came from Levene. The church, in the church village on the outskirts of the modern village, is from the 13th century, and holds the grave of the 17th century landshövding Johan Henriksson Reuter. During a renovation in 1927, a runestone was found built into the church wall. Known as Levenestenen ('the Levene stone'), it is Sweden's tallest runestone.
