= Swedish–Norwegian War (1099–1101) =

Swedish Norwegian War
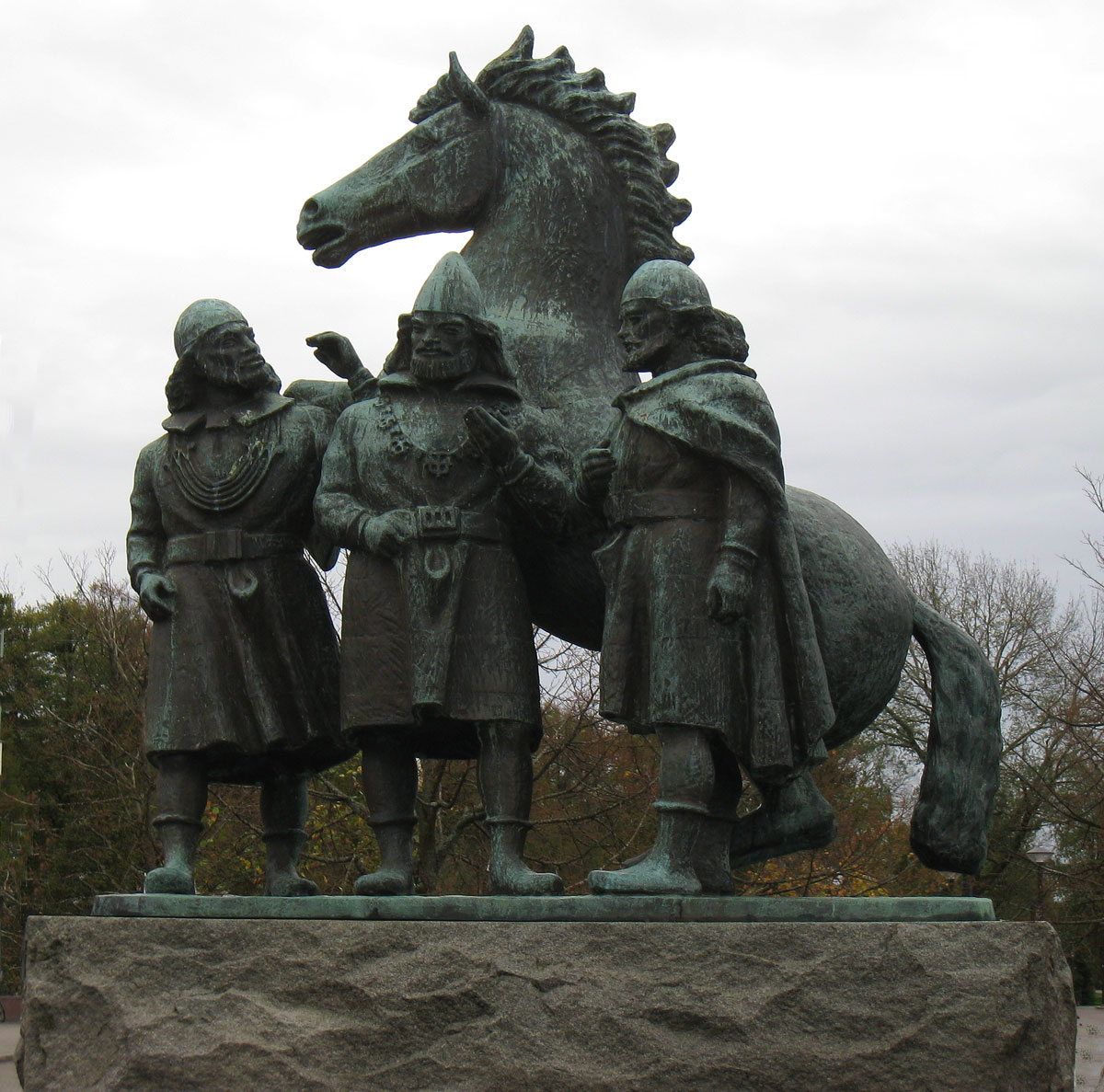
- Statue depicting the Danish, Norwegian, and Swedish kings at Kungahälla in 1101.
Date	1099–1101
Location	Dalsland, Sweden
Result	Inconclusive
Territorial changes	Dalsland falls under Norwegian rule as a dowry

Belligerents
Sweden; Geats	Kingdom of Norway

Commanders and leaders
Inge the Elder	Magnus Barefoot

Strength
3,600	300–360

The Swedish–Norwegian War (1099–1101), otherwise known as Inge the Elder's war against Magnus Barefoot, was a war between Sweden and Norway. It regarded the Norwegian claim to all lands west of the Göta River. Inge managed to successfully repel the Norwegian invasions, and peace was later signed at Kungälv in 1101.

== Background ==
According to the Heimskringla, at the end of the 8th century, Harald Fairhair conquered all land west of the Göta river and Lake Vänern, including Värmland. The time when these lands became Swedish is uncertain, however, it most likely happened prior to 1000. These old writings are what Magnus Barefoot used to justify his campaigns into Dalsland. Additionally, both Inge and Magnus believed that the people west of the Vänern should recognize them as their overlords.

== War ==
=== First campaign (1099) ===
The first campaign by Magnus seems to have been met with no resistance, and Magnus was able to force the Dalslanders to recognize him as their king and they recognized his right to the land. He also managed to establish a castle on the Kållandsö with a garrison of 360 before heading back to Norway for the winter. However, not much was achieved. Inge saw Magnus' campaigning and quickly responded by sending a large army (probably 3,600) to Kållandsö, which, after a siege, was captured, Inge also took the weapons of the besieged, and each received a beating before being returned. After which the Dalslanders again pledged their loyalty to Inge and recognized him as their king.

=== Second campaign (1101) ===
Despite the setbacks, Magnus set out on a new campaign in 1101, and began plundering up the Göta river. However, before he reached Lake Vänern, two battles took place in Fuxerna. In the first battle, the Norwegians were victorious, with the Swedes suffering heavy casualties and Inge being forced to flee. However, in the second, the Geat army won, and Magnus was forced to flee for his life. A large number of Norwegians died during the battles, either from the fighting itself or the Norwegian retreat, and Magnus managed to save his life by switching jackets with one of his troops, who rode in another direction.

== Peace ==
In 1101, the three kings of Scandinavia met in Kungahälla to conduct peace talks. Through the mediation of the Danish king, Sweden and Norway managed to make peace. The terms of the treaty were that the current borders were to apply, and Magnus had to marry Inge's daughter Margareta. Since she had received Dalsland as a dowry, the land came under Norwegian rule.
