= Stenkil =

King of Sweden c.1060–1066

King of Sweden
- Reign: c. 1060–1066
- Predecessor: Emund the Old
- Successor: Eric and Eric
- Born: Västergötland, Sweden
- Died: 1066; Svitjod, Sweden
- Spouse: Daughter of Emund the Old
- Issue: Halsten Stenkilsson; Håkan the Red (?); Inge the Elder; Eric Stenkilson?
- House: Stenkil
- Father: Ragnvald the Old
- Religion: Chalcedonian Christianity

Stenkil (Old Norse: Steinkell; died 1066) was a King of Sweden who ruled c. 1060 until 1066. He succeeded Emund the Old and became the first king from the House of Stenkil. He is praised as a devout Christian, but with an accommodating stance towards the old Pagan religion. His brief reign saw an armed conflict with Norway.

== Family background ==
The Hervarar saga (13th century) describes Stenkil as the son of Ragnvald the Old and Astrid Njalsdotter, the daughter of Njal Finnsson from Hålogaland in Norway and a cognatic descendant of Harald Fairhair. Later historians have identified the father of Stenkil as Ragnvald Ulfsson who was the earl of Ladoga and the grandson of the legendary Viking Skoglar Toste, but this presumed family-connection is not supported by any other sources and must therefore be regarded as very uncertain. The Icelandic sagas mention a wife and two sons of Ragnvald Ulfsson but none are identified with Stenkil and his mother Astrid. The contemporary chronicler Adam of Bremen says Stenkil was the nephew (nepos) or stepson (privignus) of the former King Emund the Old, while the Hervarar saga asserts that he was related to the previous dynasty by marriage to Emund's daughter.

Stenkil was probably from Västergötland rather than Uppland or the Mälaren area. The short chronicle appended to the Westrogothic law (c. 1240) clearly states that he spent time in Levene in Västergötland where he was long remembered as the king who "loved West Geats before all his other subjects", and he was lauded as a great archer whose hit marks were long shown with admiration. The tradition that Stenkil was beloved by the Geats appears to be supported by Snorri Sturluson's Heimskringla. In a speech by Thorvid, the lawspeaker (lagman) of Västergötland before a battle with Harald Hardrada (see below), the lawspeaker expresses the Geats' (Gautland people) loyalty to Stenkil:

The lagman of the Gautland people, Thorvid, sat upon a horse, and the bridle was fastened to a stake that stood in the mire. He broke out with these words: "God knows we have many brave and handsome fellows here, and we shall let King Steinkel hear that we stood by the good earl bravely. I am sure of one thing: we shall behave gallantly against these Northmen, if they attack us; but if our young people give way, and should not stand to it, let us not run farther than to that stream; but if they should give way farther, which I am sure they will not do, let it not be farther than to that hill."

The statement of the Hervarar saga that Stenkil was originally Jarl in Svíþjóð (in the first hand, the provinces around Lake Mälaren) nevertheless calls for some caution. Historian Peter Sawyer argues that the traditions associating Stenkil with Västergötland may not be reliable, but rather express a later need to advocate Västergötland as the hub of the Swedish kingdom. His active advocacy for a bishopric in Sigtuna may speak for a strong association with the Mälaren Valley.

== Support for the Bremen mission ==
Stenkil appears in history around 1056, during the reign of Emund the Old. At that time he provided support and protection for a delegation from the Archdiocese of Bremen which had been turned away by King Emund and his bishop Osmundus. Later on, a reconciliation between the king and Bremen took place, and Sweden received Adalvard the Elder as its new bishop. Emund died shortly after, in about 1060. As his son and heir Anund was already dead, Stenkil succeeded to the throne without any known commotion. Adam characterises Stenkil as God-fearing and pious. A much less flattering image of the new king is provided by the Icelandic manuscript Morkinskinna (c. 1220), which says: "King Stenkil was a portly man and heavy on his feet. He was much given to drinking parties and not much involved in the business at hand ... he himself liked to be left in peace."

The king duly supported the Christianization of Sweden and cooperated with bishops from the Archbishopric of Hamburg-Bremen. With the help of Stenkil's emissaries, Adalvard the Younger created the Sigtuna bishopric, one day's journey from the old cult center of Uppsala. According to a historically much-debated passage in Adam's chronicle, Uppsala was the site of a renowned pagan temple where sacrifices of humans and animals were performed every ninth year. After having formally converted the population around Sigtuna, Adalvard the Younger suggested to Bishop Egino in Scania that they should proceed to raze or burn down the temple. This, they hoped, would have the effect of pushing the population into conversion. However, Stenkil apprehended that the people in the area resented the aim of the bishops, and managed to talk them out of the project. As he argued, the bishops would be executed and he himself deposed since he had allowed miscreants into the land. Moreover, those already Christian would surely revert to paganism. The fears were probably justified. According to the Hervarar saga, Stenkil's son Inge the Elder was deposed and exiled for wanting to cancel the pagan sacrifices at the temple. As it was, Adalvard and Egino reluctantly had to follow Stenkil's advice. Instead, they traversed the lands of the Geats which were apparently less resistant to the new faith, and broke any pagan idols they found, making thousands of converts in the process.

== The war with Harald Hardrada ==
The later Norse sagas relate that a brief but serious conflict flared up with the Norwegian king Harald Hardrada in 1064–65. One of Harald's foremost men Håkon Jarl, was married to the king's niece Ragnhild and followed Harald on his military expeditions against the Danish ruler Sweyn Estridsen. According to Snorri Sturluson's Heimskringla the Norwegians were victorious at the Battle of Nissan in 1062, but Håkon Jarl secretly allowed the defeated Sweyn to escape alive. When this was later reported to Harald Hardrada, the enraged king gave orders to kill Håkon, who however managed to escape to Sweden. The escapee stayed with King Stenkil who made him Jarl of Värmland. According to another saga, Morkinskinna, Håkon Jarl left Norway for Denmark where he was created Jarl of Halland. Meanwhile, Harald Hardrada concluded peace with Sweyn Estridsen in 1064 and then started to harry in Stenkil's realm in Götaland. The worried Stenkil arranged a meeting with King Sweyn and asked for his support. Sweyn replied that he could not break the recent peace treaty, but advised Stenkil to appoint the valiant Håkon Jarl as sub-ruler of Västergötland, from where he could confront King Harald. This was arranged, and Håkon assembled men from Denmark as well as from the two Geatic provinces. He spoke to his troops at an assembly, where he self-assuredly said: "Even though I have a lesser title than King Stenkil, it may be that I will be of no less assistance, for he is used to an easy life, while I am accostumed to battles and hard conditions".

According to all the saga versions, Harald Hardrada reacted to Håkon Jarl's Swedish position by assembling a fleet and invading Stenkil's kingdom in the cold of the winter. At the entrance of the Göta älv, he took the lighter boats and brought them upriver, to Lake Vänern. The ships then rowed eastwards, to the place where he heard that Håkon's troops had assembled. With Håkon was the law-speaker (lagman) of the Geats, Thorvid. However, the Geats were lightly clothed, "as is always the case with the Geats", while Harald's troops were more numerous and better equipped. The Geatic law-speaker lost his head and took to his heels before the battle had begun. In the fight that followed, Håkon's troops were defeated with losses. Nevertheless, Harald did not push his advantage further, but returned to the lake shore with his men. The end of the expedition was inauspicious. Part of Harald's troops were led into a trap, ambushed and massacred by Håkon's men. As the Norwegians sailed down the Göta älv, some more were killed by Geatic archers. In the following year 1066 Harald Hardrada undertook his ill-fated invasion of England, which left the striking power of the Norwegian kingdom crippled. Håkon Jarl ended his life as a magnate in Denmark. It is not clear how much of the internally differing saga accounts can be regarded trustable, but a preserved scaldic verse by Þjóðólfr Arnórsson confirms the outlines:

Ǫld es, sús jarli skyldi · ógnteitum lið veita,
— sterkr olli því stillir — · Steinkels gefin helju.
En, þvít illa reynðisk · aflsvǫ́n þaðan hǫ́num,
fyrir lét Hǫ́kon hǫrfa, · hvat segr, hinns þat fegrir.

Steinkell’s men have been handed over to death’s realm, those who should have given support to the battle-joyous jarl; the mighty ruler [Haraldr] caused that. But, because the expectation of support from there turned out badly for him, Hákon effected a retreat, whatever anyone says who puts a gloss on it.

Morkinskinna indicates that the relations between Stenkil and Sweyn Estridsen were amicable. It is likely that the Swedish ruler had an interest in supporting Sweyn against the attempts of Harald Hardrada to subjugate Denmark between 1047 and 1062. Historian Aksel E. Christensen has concluded that the Norwegian-Danish peace treaty of 1064 was a success for the Swedish policy to prevent one king from ruling the kingdoms to the north and the south of Skagerrak. Strangely, the Knytlinga Saga tells that "King Sweyn also had a dispute with the Swedish King Stenkil, who went with his army against King Sweyn, although he did not appropriate any of his territories".

== Death and burial ==
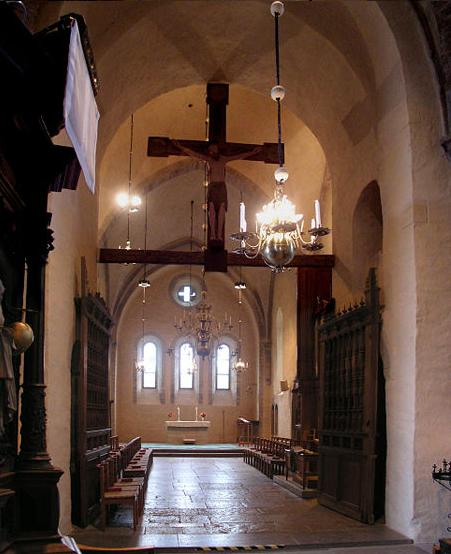
Windows created by Stenkil's dynasty in Vreta Abbey.

Adam of Bremen, Snorri Sturluson and the Hervarar saga all state that Stenkil died at the time of the Battle of Hastings in England (1066). His death triggered a violent civil war, perhaps caused by rising tension between Christianity and adherents of the pagan religion. According to a legend Stenkil was buried in the "royal hill" near Levene in Västergötland. His two sons Halsten and Inge the Elder would both become kings of Sweden. In a letter to Halsten and Inge from c. 1081, Pope Gregory VII apparently praised Stenkil, since he expressed hope that they might compete with their "predecessor" in honourable lives and deeds.

The Hervarar saga has a great deal to tell about Stenkil:

Steinkell hét ríkr maðr í Svíaríki ok kynstórr; móðir hans hét Ástríðr, dóttir Njáls Finnssonar ins skjálga af Hálogalandi, en faðir hans var Rögnvaldr inn gamli. Steinkell var fyrst jarl í Svíþjóð, en eptir dauða Eymundar konungs tóku Svíar hann til konungs. Þá gekk konungdómr ór langfeðgaætt í Svíþjóð inna fornu konunga. Steinkell var mikill höfðingi. Hann átti dóttur Eymundar konungs. Hann varð sóttdauðr í Svíþjóð nær því, er Haraldr konungr fell á Englandi. Ingi hét sonr Steinkels, er Svíar tóku til konungs næst eptir Hákon.

There was a great man of noble family in Sweden called Steinkel. His mother's name was Astrith, the daughter of Njal the son of Fin the Squinter, from Halogaland; and his father was Rögnvald the Old. Steinkel was an Earl in Sweden at first, and then after the death of Emund the Old, the Swedes elected him their King. Then the throne passed out of the line of the ancient kings of Sweden. Steinkel was a mighty prince. He married the daughter of King Eymund. He died in his bed in Sweden about the time that King Harold fell in England. Steinkel had a son called Ingi, who became King of Sweden after Haakon.

== Family ==
Stenkil was married to a daughter of Emund the Old, and had at least two children:

- Halsten, King of Sweden, or parts of Sweden, died after 1081
- Inge I, King of Sweden, died around 1110

It has been speculated that one of the two pretenders called Eric (around 1066–67) was his son, although there is nothing to support this assumption. A later king, Håkan the Red (1070s), is associated with Stenkil's abode Levene in Västergötland and might have been a close kinsman.

== Notes and references ==
Stenkil House of Stenkil Born: 1030 Died: 1066
Regnal titles
Preceded by Emund the Old	King of Sweden c. 1060–1066	Succeeded by Eric and Eric
