= Princess Astrid =

Princess Astrid may refer to:

== People ==
- Astrid Njalsdotter (11th century)
- Astrid Olofsdotter of Sweden (died 1035)
- Astrid of Sweden (1905–1935)
- Princess Astrid of Norway (1932–2026)
- Archduchess Marie-Astrid of Austria (born 1954)
- Princess Astrid of Liechtenstein (born 1968)
- Princess Astrid of Belgium (born 1962)
- Princess Marie-Astrid of Liechtenstein (born 1987)

== Other ==
- Princess Astrid Coast, coast in Antarctica
- Princess Astrid Music Award, Norwegian music prize
