= Blot-Sweyn =

Swedish king of disputed historicity

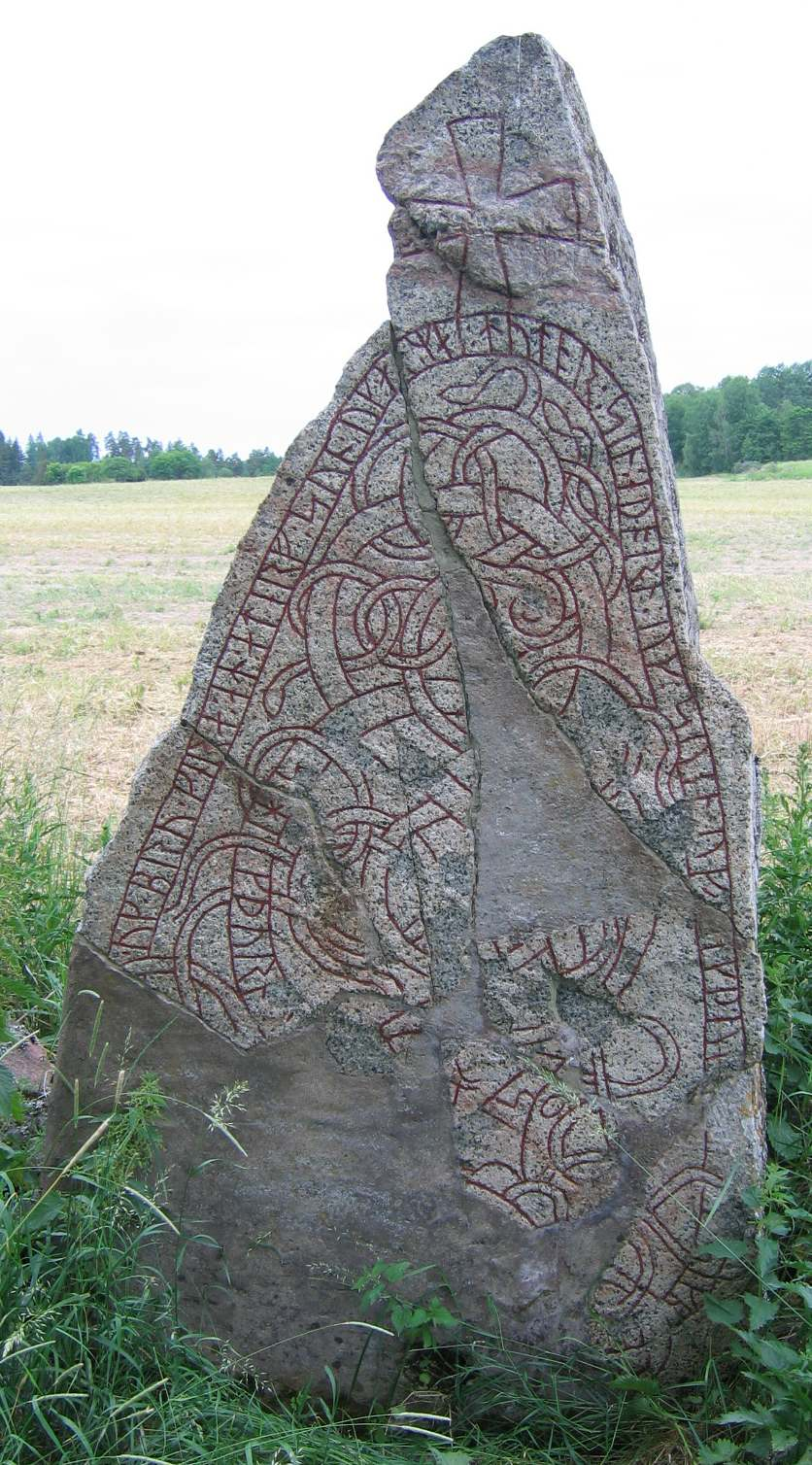
The Norsta Runestone (U 861) on the drive of Wik Castle outside Uppsala was probably made by Sweyn and his family, as it mentions two people called Sweyn and Mær (mentioned in the accusative form Møy). It is the only existing mention of a woman named Mær ("maiden") besides the mention of Sweyn's sister Mær in Hervarar saga, and it is contemporary with Sweyn.

Blot-Sweyn (Swedish: Blot-Sven) was a Swedish king c. 1080, of disputed historicity, who was said to have replaced his Christian brother-in-law Inge as King of Sweden, when Inge had refused to administer the blót (pagan sacrifices) at the Temple at Uppsala. There is no mention of Sweyn in the regnal list of the Westrogothic law, which suggests that his rule did not reach Västergötland. According to Swedish historian Adolf Schück he was probably the same person as Håkan the Red and was called the Blót Swain (a swain who was willing to perform the blót) as an epithet rather than a personal name.

== Becoming king ==
The earliest source that deals with Blot-Sweyn's coming to power is the Icelandic legendary saga Hervarar saga:

King Ingi married a woman called Mær who had a brother called Svein. King Ingi liked Svein better than any other man, and Svein became thereby the greatest man in Sweden.

However, Inge did not permit the people to follow the old ways, unlike his father Stenkil. The Swedes reacted strongly and asked Inge to either comply with the old traditions or abdicate. When Inge proclaimed that he would not abandon Christianity, the people pelted him with stones and chased him away. This was the opportunity for Sweyn to assume power, and the account provided by Hervarar saga concerning his inauguration contains a rare description of the ancient Indo-European ritual of horse sacrifice:

Svein, the King's brother-in-law, remained behind in the assembly, and offered the Swedes to do sacrifices on their behalf if they would give him the Kingdom. They all agreed to accept Svein's offer, and he was then recognized as King over all Sweden. A horse was then brought to the assembly and hewn in pieces and cut up for eating, and the sacred tree was smeared with blood. Then all the Swedes abandoned Christianity, and sacrifices started again. They drove King Ingi away; and he went into Vestergötland.

== Legend of Saint Eskil ==
The later Legend of Saint Eskil tells that Inge was chased away from the kingdom. They then elected an idolator for king by the name Sweyn, an unworthy man and with reason called Blood-Sweyn. He had this name because he made the people drink blood from bulls that had been sacrificed to the gods, and he ate the sacrificial meat. The people assembled around their king in Strängnäs, where they butchered oxen and sheep, and gave offerings to their gods. They had a great banquet in honour of the king and their gods. The English bishop Eskil then appeared and tried to convert the pagans to Christianity. They would not listen, however. Eskil prayed, and God sent thunder, hail, snow and rain destroying the sacrificial altar and beasts of sacrifice. Not a single drop fell on the bishop. The pagans were not impressed and furiously, they attacked Eskil. A diviner named Spåbodde hit him on the head with a stone, while another man crushed his head with an axe. Some chieftains dragged the dying martyr to the king saying that Eskil had used magic arts to control the weather. As soon as the unrightful king had sentenced Eskil to death, he was taken to the valley where the monastery later was founded, and he was stoned to death.

This legend is, however, only known from the late 13th century. An account by Aelnoth of Canterbury (c. 1122) relates that an Eskillinus was killed by pagan Swedes and Geats at an unspecified time. Since he is not mentioned by the clerical historian Adam of Bremen (c. 1075), he may have flourished in the late 11th century. According to another opinion, Eskil's death is more probably dated in c. 1016, several generations before Blot-Sweyn.

== Death ==
According to Hervarar saga, the rule of Sweyn was not to last. Before long, the Christian Inge decided to kill the pagan Sweyn:

Svein the Sacrificer was King of Sweden for three years. King Ingi set off with his retinue and some of his followers, though it was but a small force. He then rode eastwards by Småland and into Östergötland and then into Sweden. He rode both day and night, and came upon Svein suddenly in the early morning. They caught him in his house and set it on fire and burned the band of men who were within. There was a baron called Thjof who was burnt inside. He had been previously in the retinue of Svein the Sacrificer. Svein himself left the house, but was slain immediately.

A similar account appears in the Orkneyinga saga, but in this text, Sweyn remains inside and is burnt to death:

Christianity was then young in Sweden; there were then many men who went about with witchcraft, and thought by that to become wise and knowing of many things which had not yet come to pass. King Ingi was a thorough Christian man, and all wizards were loathsome to him. He took great pains to root out those evil ways which had long gone hand in hand with heathendom, but the rulers of the land and the great freeholders took it ill that their bad customs were found fault with. So it came about that the freemen chose them another king, Sweyn, the brother of the queen, who still held to his sacrifices to idols, and was called Sacrifice-Sweyn. Before him king Ingi was forced to fly the land into West-Gothland; but the end of their dealings was, that king Ingi took the house over Sweyn's head and burnt him inside it. After that he took all the land under him. Then he still went on rooting out many bad ways.

== Succession ==
It is possible that Inge was not immediately accepted by the stubbornly pagan Swedes of Uppland. The 13th-century historian Snorri Sturlusson wrote in the Heimskringla that Blót-Sweyn had a pagan successor who continued the sacrifices:

At that time there were many people all around in the Swedish dominions who were heathens, and many were bad Christians; for there were some of the kings who renounced Christianity, and continued heathen sacrifices, as Blotsvein, and afterwards Eirik Arsale, had done.

This "Eirik Arsale" (Erik Årsäll) is mentioned in other sources as being the son of Blot-Sweyn, but today is not considered a historical person by most historians.

== Notes ==
Blot-Sven Died: c. 1087
Regnal titles
Preceded by Inge the Elder	King of Sweden c. 1084–c. 1087	Succeeded by Inge the Elder
