= Håkan the Red =

King of Sweden

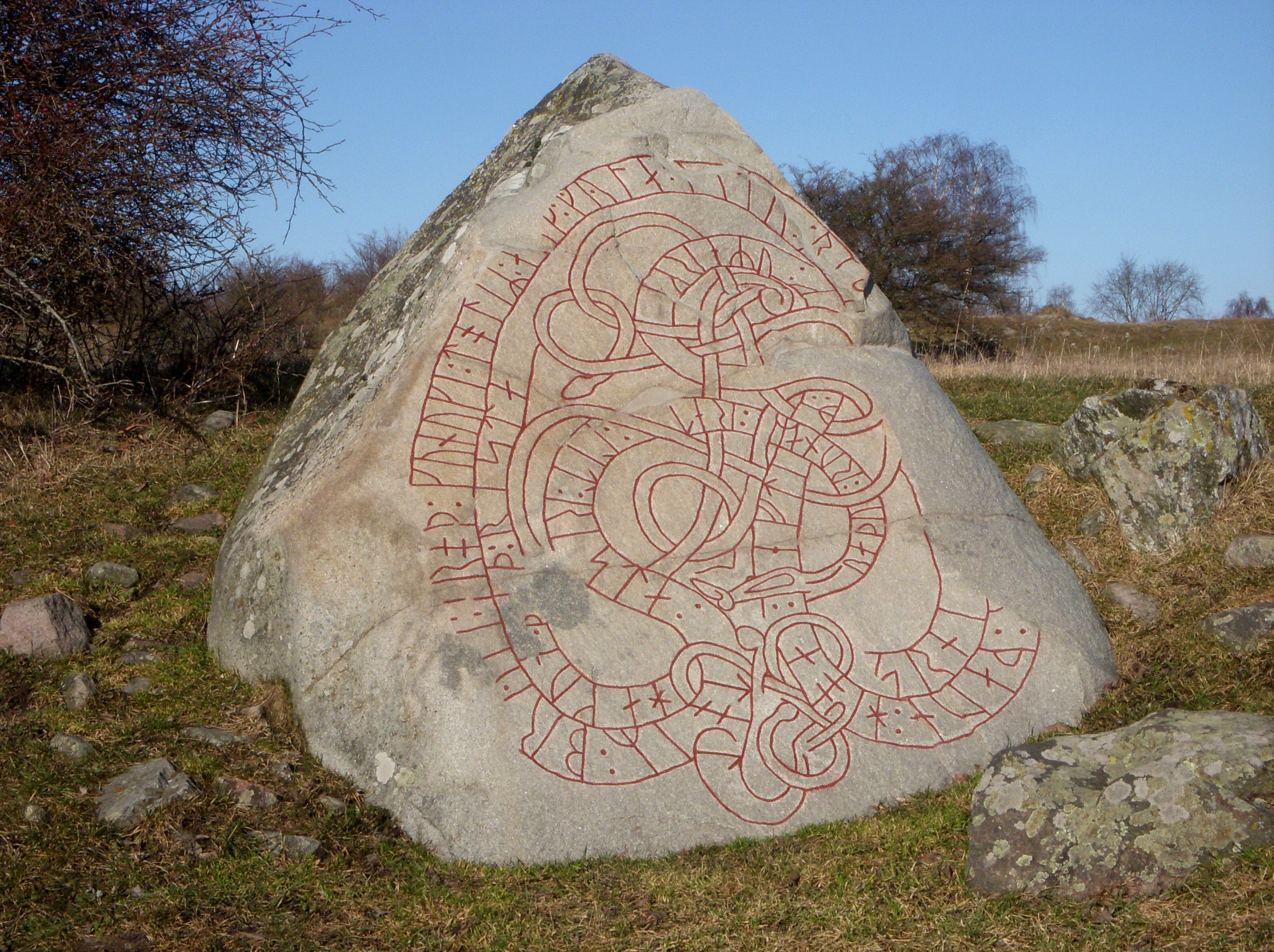
Runestone U 11 on Adelsö island in Lake Mälaren, probably carved at Håkan the Red's request.

Håkan the Red (Swedish: Håkan Röde) was a King of Sweden, reigning for about half a decade in the second half of the 11th century. There is little information on him, and it is mostly contradictory. Nothing is known about his reign.

Swedish historian Adolf Schück has asserted that, rather than Blot-Sweyn being an individual king, there are indications that that may have been an epithet for King Håkan.

His cognomen the Red comes from the regnal list of the Westrogothic law, written in early 13th century. The same source claims that he was born in Levene, in Västergötland.

== Succession sequence ==
Despite contradiction in the sources, Håkan's position as a successor of Stenkil in the line of Swedish kings is generally accepted as correct. Perhaps he reigned from c. 1066/1070 in some areas of Sweden (succeeding Stenkil or Halsten Stenkilsson), and from c. 1075 in Uppland as well (succeeding Anund Gårdske). The regnal line in Nationalencyklopedin omits Anund Gårdske and presents Håkan as successor of Halsten Stenkilsson. Nationalencyclopedin also suggests that he may have ruled jointly with Inge the Elder in the 1080s. A papal letter from Gregory VII is addressed to Inge together with either Håkan or Halsten Stenkilsson as kings of the västgötar, ordering them to collect tithe and send priests to Rome to educate themselves.

According to Encyclopædia Britannica, "[a]t the end of the Viking Age [approximately 1050], Sweden remained a loose federation of provinces. The old family of kings died out in 1060; after the death of the last of these kings' son-in-law, Stenkil, in 1066, a civil war broke out. Around 1080 Stenkil's sons, Ingi and Halsten, ruled, [...]." If "civil war" is an appropriate characterisation of the period from 1066 to 1080, the rulers of that epoch would be in the grey area between "king" and "warlord". Describing this period for Sweden as a whole in a linear translatio imperii kind of regnal succession, can then only be achieved at least partially based on speculative historical reconstruction, which appears to have happened in diverging directions from the early 13th century on, at the latest.

=== Adam of Bremen ===
A scholion in Adam of Bremen's History of the Archbishops of Hamburg-Bremen (written 1070s–early 1080s) says that Håkan was elected king after Stenkil's son Halsten had been deposed, and after Anund Gårdske also had been rejected. At his enthronement he was obliged to "take the mother of young Olof in marriage". It is not clear from Adam's text which Olof is meant, but it has been suggested that he might be King Olav Kyrre of Norway, whose mother Tora Torbergsdatter was a cognatic descendant of the Norwegian branch of the Yngling dynasty. While this remains unproven, the marriage was probably a politically well-planned act to gain support for Håkan's rule. Historian Sture Bolin has argued that the passage about Olof's mother in fact refers to Tora Torbergsdotter marrying the Danish King Sweyn Estridsen, and has nothing to do with Håkan. However, while Adam of Bremen mentions a Tora at Sweyn's court, he characterises her as his concubine rather than wife.

=== Regnal list of the Westrogothic law ===
According to the regnal list of the Westrogothic law, Håkan the Red would have ruled 13 years, as Stenkil's predecessor. He was born in Levene in Viste Hundred in Västergötland, and was buried there after his demise. The Levene estate is also associated with King Stenkil, suggesting that Håkan might have sprung from the same kin group. Another Swedish king list from the 13th century has the sequence Stenkil - Halsten - Näskonung - Blot-Sweyn - Håkan the Red (Haquinus rufus) - Inge the Elder.

=== Sagas ===
In Magnus Barefoot's Saga, a part of Snorri Sturluson's Heimskringla (1225), he is given as the successor of Stenkil (who died in 1066):

Steinkel, the Swedish king, died about the same time as the two Haralds fell, and the king who came after him in Svithjod was called Håkan. Afterwards Inge, a son of Steinkel,

was king, [...]

Similarly, in Hervarar saga (13th century):

Steinkel had a son called Ingi, who became King of Sweden after Håkan.

== Runestone ==
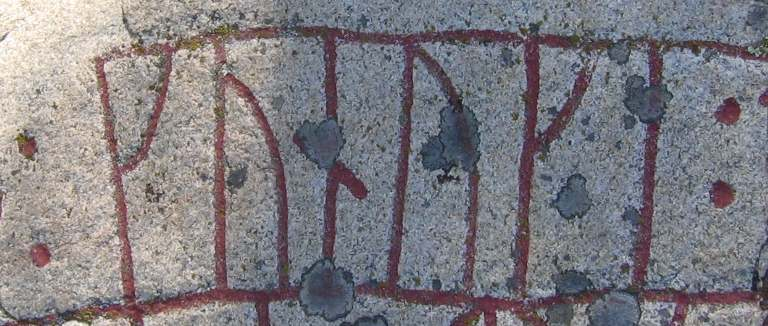
Detail from U 11 showing the word kunungi or "king."

Presumably it was Håkan the Red who ordered the carving of a runestone found in Hovgården (Adelsö island in Lake Mälaren, Uppland, Sweden). The Rundata catalog number of this runestone is U 11.

== Notes and references ==
Håkan Röde House of Stenkil Died: c. 1079
Regnal titles
Preceded by Halsten as King of Sweden	(possibly) King of Gothenland c. 1066/70–c. 1075	Succeeded by Himself as King of whole Sweden
Preceded by Himself as King of Gothenland	King of Sweden c. 1075–c. 1079	Succeeded by Inge the Elder & Halsten
Preceded by Anund Gårdske	King of Sweden c. 1075–c. 1079	Succeeded by Inge the Elder & Halsten
