= Inge the Elder =

King of Sweden c. 1080–1110

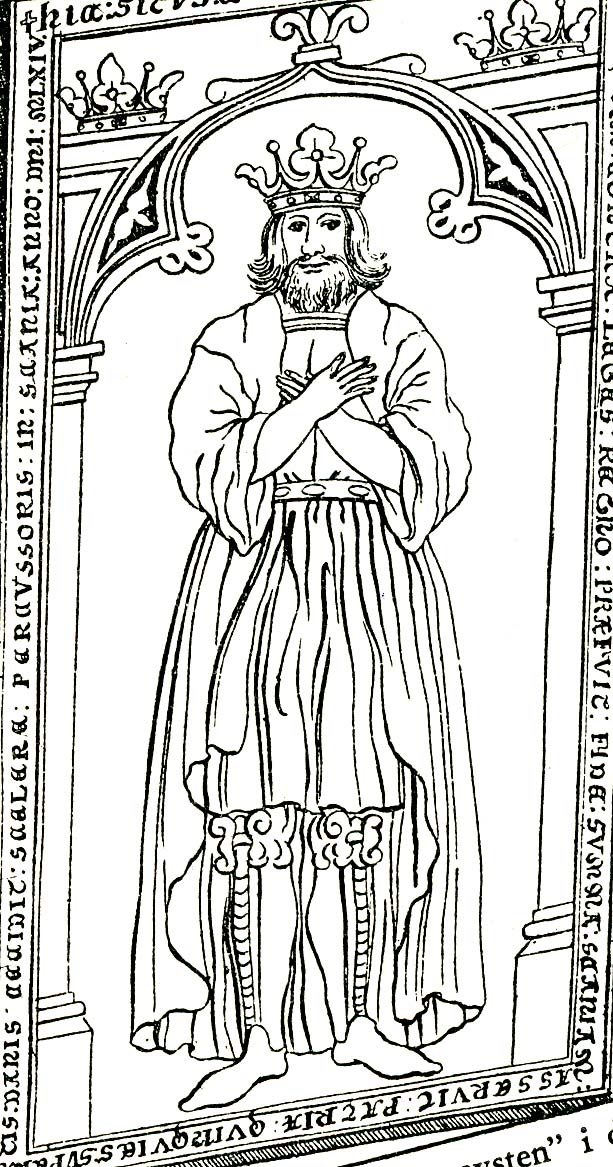
- image of his 16th century cenotaph

King of Sweden
- Reign: c. 1080 – c. 1110
- Predecessor: Håkan the Red
- Successor: Philip
- Born: c. 1040
- Died: c. 1110 (aged 69–70)
- Burial: Hånger then moved to Varnhem Abbey
- Spouse: Helena
- Issue: Christina, Grand Duchess of Kiev; Ragnvald Ingesson; Margaret, Queen of Norway and Denmark; Katarina Ingesdotter
- House: Stenkil
- Father: Stenkil
- Mother: Ingamoder Emundsdotter

Inge the Elder (Swedish: Inge Stenkilsson; Old Norse: Ingi Steinkelsson; died c. 1105–1110) was a king of Sweden. In English literature he has also been called Ingold. While scant sources do not allow a full picture of his term of kingship, he is known to have led a turbulent but at length successful reign of more than two decades. He stands out as a devout Christian who founded the first abbey in Sweden and acted harshly against pagan practices. The kingdom was still an unstable realm based on alliances of noblemen, and Inge's main power base was in Västergötland and Östergötland; one of the earliest chronicles that mention his reign knows him as rex gautorum, king of the Geats.

== Biography ==
Inge was the son of the former King Stenkil and a Swedish princess. Inge shared the rule of the kingdom with his probably elder brother Halsten Stenkilsson, but little is known with certainty of Inge's reign. According to the contemporary chronicler Adam of Bremen and the writer of his scholion, the former king Stenkil had died and two kings named Eric had ruled and been killed. Then an Anund Gårdske was summoned from Kievan Rus', but rejected due to his refusal to administer the blóts at the Temple at Uppsala. A hypothesis suggests that Anund and Inge were the same person, as several sources mention Inge as a fervent Christian. All that can be said is that a Håkan the Red ruled in c. 1075 (when Adam concluded his chronicle) and that Inge was enthroned under unknown circumstances shortly before 1080.

In a letter to Inge from Pope Gregory VII, from 1080, he is called "king of the Swedes", but in a later letter probably dated to 1081, to Inge and another king "A" (either his brother Halsten or Håkan the Red), they are called kings of the West Geats. Whether this difference reflects a change in territory is not certain since the two letters concern the spreading of Christianity in Sweden and the paying of tithe to the Pope.

=== Rise of Blot-Sweyn and the expulsion of Inge ===
In perhaps the early 1080s, Inge was forced to abdicate by the Swedes over his disrespect for old traditions and his refusal to administer the pagan custom of the blót. Blot-Sweyn (Swain the Sacrifier) was thus elected king. The Hervarar saga describes the rise of Sweyn, the abdication and how Inge was exiled in Västergötland:

Steinkel had a son called Ingi, who became King of Sweden after Haakon. Ingi was King of Sweden for a long time, and was popular and a good Christian. He tried to put an end to heathen sacrifices in Sweden and commanded all the people to accept Christianity; yet the Swedes held to their ancient faith. King Ingi married a woman called Mær who had a brother called Svein. King Ingi liked Svein better than any other man, and Svein became thereby the greatest man in Sweden. The Swedes considered that King Ingi was violating the ancient law of the land when he took exception to many things which Steinkel his father had permitted, and at an assembly held between the Swedes and King Ingi, they offered him two alternatives, either to follow the old order, or else to abdicate. Then King Ingi spoke up and said that he would not abandon the true faith; whereupon the Swedes raised a shout and pelted him with stones, and drove him from the assembly. [...] They drove King Ingi away; and he went into Vestergötland. Svein the Sacrificer was King of Sweden for three years.

However, Inge returned after three winters to kill Blot-Sweyn and reclaim the throne:

King Ingi set off with his retinue and some of his followers, though it was but a small force. He then rode eastwards by Småland and into Östergötland and then into Sweden. He rode both day and night, and came upon Svein suddenly in the early morning. They caught him in his house and set it on fire and burned the band of men who were within. There was a baron called Thjof who was burnt inside. He had been previously in the retinue of Svein the Sacrificer. Svein himself left the house, but was slain immediately. Thus Ingi once more received the Kingdom of Sweden; and he reestablished Christianity and ruled the Kingdom till the end of his life, when he died in his bed.

A similar story also appears in the Orkneyinga saga, but in this account, Sweyn stays indoors and is burnt to death:

Christianity was then young in Sweden; there were then many men who went about with witchcraft, and thought by that to become wise and knowing of many things which had not yet come to pass. King Ingi was a thorough Christian man, and all wizards were loathsome to him. He took great pains to root out those evil ways which had long gone hand in hand with heathendom, but the rulers of the land and the great freeholders took it ill that their bad customs were found fault with. So it came about that the freemen chose them another king, Sweyn, the queen’s brother, who still held to his sacrifices to idols, and was called Sacrifice-Sweyn. Before him king Ingi was forced to fly the land into West-Gothland; but the end of their dealings was, that king Ingi took the house over Sweyn’s head and burnt him inside it. After that he took all the land under him. Then he still went on rooting out many bad ways.

In Västergötland, Inge lived, according to later tradition, at Bjurum near present-day Falköping. An Icelandic skald named Markús Skeggjason was one of his court poets, according to Skáldatal. Markús was later the lawspeaker of Iceland from 1084. It has been suggested that the details about Inge and Blot-Sweyn in the Norse literature are derived from him. In that case Blot-Sweyn's short reign would fall in the early years of the 1080s.

According to the Westrogothic law, Inge ruled Sweden with virility and he never broke the laws that had been accepted in the districts.

=== Later years ===
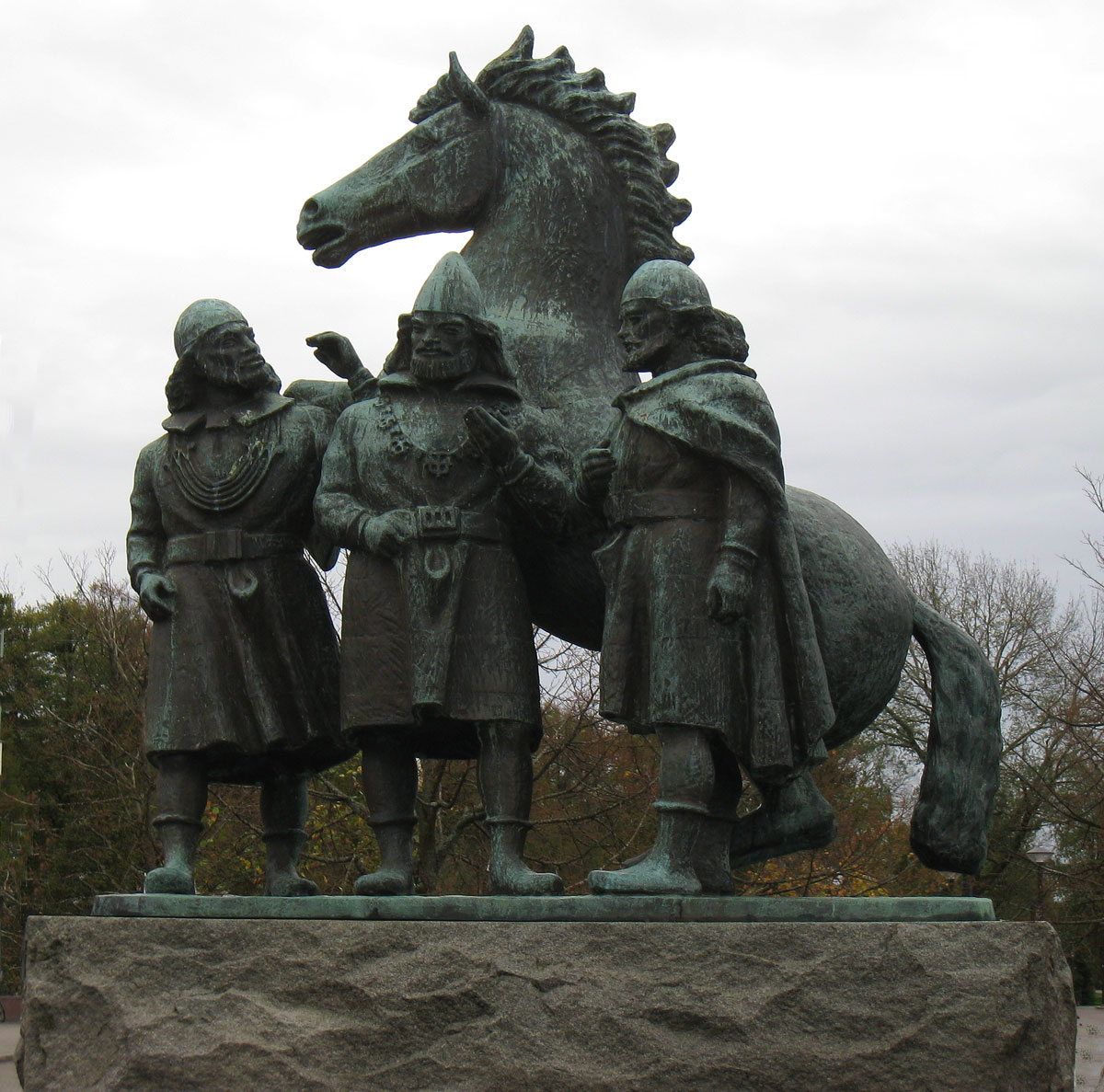
Modern statue depicting the meeting of the three kings in 1101 at Kungahälla

Around 1100, Inge and Queen Helena founded Vreta Abbey near present-day Linköping in Östergötland. The abbey housed Sweden's first nunnery and is one of the oldest in Scandinavia. The abbey belonged to the Benedictine order and was founded on the orders of Pope Paschal II. As a step in the preparation of a Nordic archbishopric in Lund in Denmark, a list of Swedish sees and provinces was drawn up in c. 1100 which gives an idea about Inge's realm. The sees (Nomina ciuitatum in suethia) are given as Scara, Lionga, Kaupinga, Tuna, Strigin, Sigituna, and Arosa. Of these, Scara and Sigituna are easily identified as Skara and Sigtuna; these are also mentioned by Adam of Bremen as seats for bishops. Lionga and Strigin are probably Linköping and Strängnäs, while the others are harder to identify. These might have been places with a substantial Christian population, rather than stable administrative units. Meanwhile, the provinces or "islands" (Nomina insularum, de regno sueuorum) are Gothica australis (Östergötland), Gothica occidentalis (Västergötland), Guasmannia (Västmanland), Sundermannia (Södermanland), Nerh (Närke), Tindia (Tiundaland), Fedundria (Fjädrundaland), Atanht (Attundaland), Guthlandia (Gotland), Guarandia (Värend), Findia (Finland or Finnveden), Hestia (Estonia), Helsingia (Helsingland), Guarmelande (Värmland), and Teuste (Tjust). The inclusion of Estonia, and possibly Finland, may point to missionary influences or ambitions, rather than indicating that these areas belonged to Inge's kingdom. It is, nevertheless, known that Inge married one of his daughters to a Prince of Novgorod, pointing at an active dynastic policy directed to the east.

About this time Inge and the Norwegian king Magnus Barefoot were at war, since Magnus coveted the province Dalsland. A Norwegian fortification was built at Kållandsö in Lake Vänern. However, Inge marched a strong army over the ice in the winter, and forced the garrison to surrender. Some time later Magnus invaded western Sweden with fresh troops, but was attacked by Inge at Fuxarne. The Geats drove the Norwegian army from the field and Magnus barely escaped with his life. However, in 1101 the war came to an end with a peace agreement concluded at Kungahälla together with king Eric Evergood of Denmark. Eric had spent time in exile in Sweden before his enthronement, and therefore probably had good relations with the House of Stenkil. At this meeting Inge gave his daughter Margareta as wife to king Magnus, with Dalsland as dowry. In Snorri's Magnus Barefoot's Saga, a part of the Heimskringla, there is a description of the appearance of Inge:

King Inge was the largest and stoutest, and, from his age, of the most dignified appearance. King Magnus appeared the most gallant and brisk, and King Eric the most handsome. But they were all handsome men; stout, gallant, and ready in speech.

=== Death ===
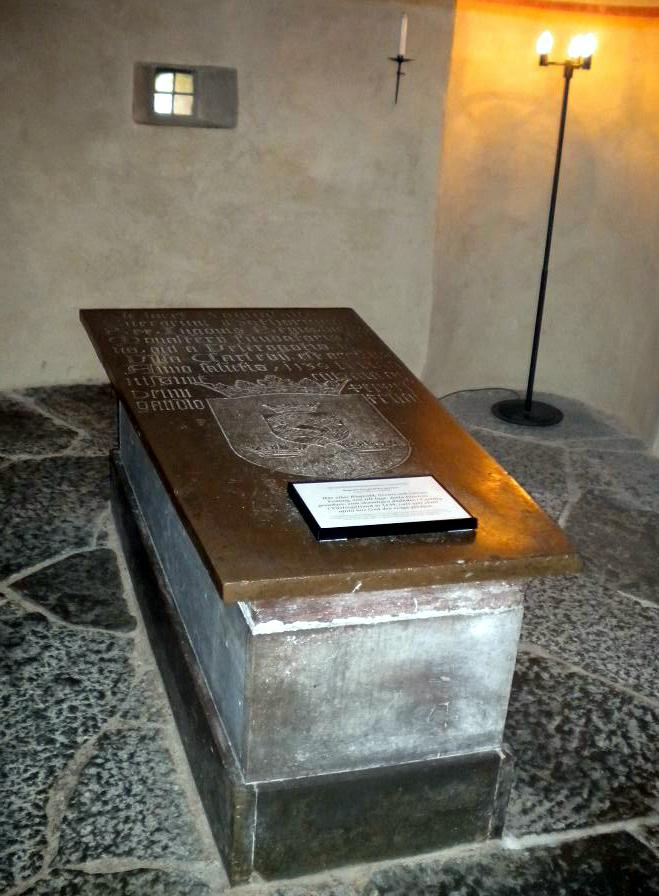
Family grave at Vreta Abbey

The Hervarar saga tells that Inge died of old age and that he ruled until his death. The exact date of his death is not known, but his successor Philip (d. 1118) is said to have ruled "briefly". Since the province of Jämtland went over to the Norwegian king in 1111, it might mean that the forceful Inge was dead by the time, and that his weak successors were unable to maintain his realm. He may therefore have died around 1110. According to later local tradition, Inge was originally buried in a small church at Bjurum, but his remains were later moved to another location. There is also a gravestone for him in a deserted churchyard at Hånger and a special cenotaph among other royal grave chapels at Varnhem Abbey. Inge's actual grave is most likely a set of remains found in Vreta Abbey in a section of the abbey church that was erected by Inge's son Ragnvald. All skeletons that are likely to be that of Inge are very tall, about two meters in length, suggesting that Snorri's description was accurate.

== Family ==
King Inge was married to Helena. Together with Helena, Inge founded the monastery of Vreta. Inge's son, Ragnvald, died before he could succeed his father on the throne. Inge was succeeded by his two nephews, Philip and Inge the Younger, who were the sons of his elder brother King Halsten Stenkilsson.

King Inge and Queen Helena were the parents of four children:

- Christina, married Prince Mstislav I of Novgorod, later Grand Duke of Kiev.
- Ragnvald, father of Ingrid Ragnvaldsdotter. It has been suggested by historian Sven Tunberg that this Ragnvald is identical with Ragnvald Knaphövde.
- Margaret Fredkulla, married King Magnus Barefoot of Norway, and later King Niels of Denmark
- Katarina, married Danish Prince Björn Ironside Haraldsson

== See also ==
- Hervarar saga ok Heiðreks

== Sources ==
- Lagerqvist, Lars O. Sverige och dess regenter under 1.000 år(Stockholm: Albert Bonniers Förlag AB., 1982)
- Soloviev, Sergei The History of Russia from the Most Ancient Times (1959–1966)
- William, Abbot of Ebelholt, "Genealogia regum Danorum" (1195), in Scriptores minores historiae Danicae medii aevi (Copenhagen: Gad, 1917–18).

Inge the Elder House of Stenkil Died: c. 1105/10
Regnal titles
| Preceded by Håkan the Red | King of Sweden c. 1079 – c. 1084 with Halsten Stenkilsson | Succeeded by Blot-Sweyn |
| Preceded by Håkan the Red | King of Sweden c. 1079 – c. 1084 with Halsten Stenkilsson | Succeeded by Himself as King of Gothenland |
| Preceded by Himself as King of Sweden | King of Gothenland c. 1084 – c. 1087 | Succeeded by Himself as King of Sweden |
| Preceded by Blot-Sweyn | King of Sweden c. 1087 – c. 1105/10 | Succeeded by Philip |
| Preceded by Himself as King of Gothenland | King of Sweden c. 1087 – c. 1105/10 | Succeeded by Philip |
