= Hånger =

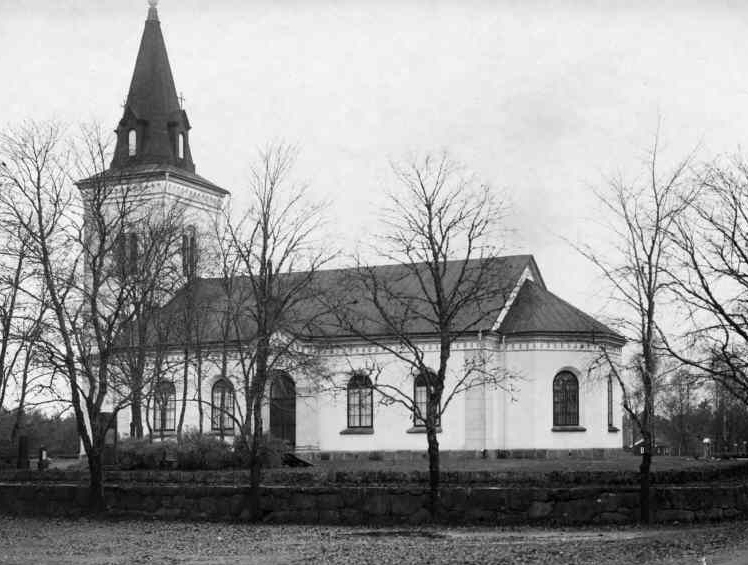

- Location within Jönköping Location within Sweden
- Coordinates: 57°05′N 13°58′E
- Country: Sweden
- Province: Småland
- County: Jönköping County
- Municipality: Värnamo Municipality

Area
  - Total: 0.36 km^{2} (0.14 sq mi)

Population (31 December 2010)
  - Total: 301
  - Density: 846/km^{2} (2,190/sq mi)
- Time zone: UTC+1 (CET)
  - Summer (DST): UTC+2 (CEST)

Hånger is a locality situated in Värnamo Municipality, Jönköping County, Sweden with around 301 inhabitants in 2010.
