= Anund from Russia =

King of Sweden (c. 1070)

Anund from Russia (Swedish: Anund Gårdske) was King of Sweden around 1070 according to Adam of Bremen's Gesta Hammaburgensis ecclesiae pontificum. According to this source, Anund came from Kievan Rus', presumably from Aldeigjuborg. Gårdske means that he came from Gardariki which was one of the Scandinavian names for Kievan Rus'.

As a Christian he refused to carry out the public sacrifice to the Norse gods, presumably at the Temple at Uppsala, and was consequently deposed. He "left the Thing in joy, for having been found worthy to suffer disgrace for the name of Jesus". This happened shortly before the completion of Adam of Bremen's chronicle in the mid-1070s.

A hypothesis suggests that Anund and Inge the Elder were the same person, as several sources mention Inge as a fervent Christian, and the Hervarar saga describes how Inge also was rejected for refusing to administer the blóts and that he was exiled in Västergötland.

== Notes and references ==
Anund from Russia Born: unknown Died: unknown
Regnal titles
Preceded by Halsten	King of Sweden around 1070	Succeeded by Håkan the Red
