= Halsten Stenkilsson =

King of Sweden c.1067–1070

King of Sweden
- Reign: c. 1067–c. 1070
- Predecessor: Eric and Eric
- Successor: Håkan the Red (as King of Gothenland); Anund Gårdske (as King of Svealand)

King of Sweden with Inge the Elder
- Reign: c. 1079–after 1081
- Predecessor: Håkan the Red
- Successor: Inge the Elder (as King of Gothenland); Blot-Sweyn (as King of Svealand)
- Born: c. 1050
- Died: unknown, after 1081
- Issue: Philip of Sweden; Inge the Younger
- House: Stenkil
- Father: Stenkil
- Mother: Ingamoder Emundsdotter

Halsten Stenkilsson (English exonym: Alstan; Old Icelandic: Hallstein) was King of Sweden from c. 1067 to 1070. The son of King Stenkil and a Swedish princess, he became king some time after his father's death (1066), and he may have ruled together with his brother Inge the Elder. The date of his death is not known.

== Brief kingship ==
Little is known of his time as king. In a scholia in the work of Adam of Bremen, he is reported to have been elected king after the violent death of two pretenders, but took over a highly volatile situation. While he was clearly a Christian like his father and brother, his influence may have been limited, since Adam relates that Christianity was so disturbed that the bishops appointed by the Archdiocese of Bremen did not even dare to travel to Sweden. He was deposed after a short while, in the late 1060s or early 1070s, and replaced by a princeling from Gardariki, Anund.

== Possible later reign ==
That he later on ruled together with his brother Inge has some support from a papal letter from 1081, by Pope Gregory VII, which refers to two kings with the initials A and I, and where they are called kings of Västergötland (rege wisigothorum). However, the king "A" could also be Håkan the Red. His co-rulership with his brother Inge is also mentioned in the Hervarar saga. In the regnal list of the Westrogothic law, he is said to have been courteous and cheerful, and whenever a case was submitted to him, he judged fairly, and this was why Sweden mourned his death. He was the father of the co-rulers Philip and Inge the Younger.

The Hervarar saga, which is one of the few sources about the kings of this time, has the following to tell:

Hallsteinn hét sonr Steinkels konungs, bróðir Inga konungs, er konungr var með Inga konungi, bróður sínum. Synir Hallsteins váru þeir Philippus ok Ingi, er konungdóm tóku í Svíþjóð eptir Inga konung gamla.

King Steinkel had, besides Ingi, another son Hallstein who reigned along with his brother. Hallstein's sons were Philip and Ingi, and they succeeded to the Kingdom of Sweden after King Ingi the elder.

== Notes and references ==
Halsten House of Stenkil Born: c. 1050 Died: after 1081
Regnal titles
Preceded by Eric and Eric	King of Sweden c. 1067–c. 1070	Succeeded by Håkan the Red as King of Gothenland
Preceded by Eric and Eric	King of Sweden c. 1067–c. 1070	Succeeded by Anund Gårdske as King of Svealand
Preceded by Håkan the Red	King of Sweden c. 1079–after 1081 with Inge the Elder	Succeeded by Inge the Elder as King of Gothenland
Preceded by Håkan the Red	King of Sweden c. 1079–after 1081 with Inge the Elder	Succeeded by Blot-Sweyn as King of Svealand
