= Ingamoder =

Coordinates: 58°16′3.13″N 13°51′1.31″E

- Queen consort of Sweden
- Born: c. 1025
- Spouse: Stenkil
- Issue: Inge the Elder; Halsten Stenkilsson; Sweyn Stenkilsson; Eric
- House: Munsö
- Father: Emund the Old

Ingamoder is a Swedish name invented in modern times for the daughter of King Emund the Old who was married to King Stenkil of Sweden and whose given name is not known. It translates to English as "Mother of Inge" (that is of King Inge the Elder).

== Biography ==
The woman was born about 1025 to King Emund. She married Stenkil, who would later inherit her father's title. According to a few more or less reliable sources King Stenkil had four sons, of which the first two can be considered known to history:

- Inge the Elder, King of Sweden
- Halsten Stenkilsson, King of Sweden
- Sweyn Stenkilsson
- Eric

== Purported identity as Ingemo ==
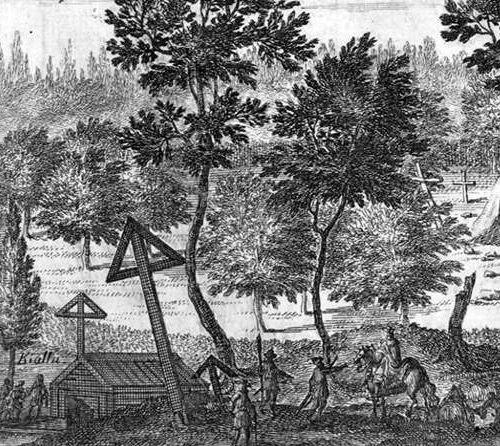
Ingemo's Well and sacred grove in 1705 according to Suecia Antiqua et Hodierna

Ingemo was a local Swedish saint in Västergötland, however, she was not officially sanctioned and recognized by the Church. She is known only from customs at the Ingemo Well in Sweden. Ingemo Well (Swedish: Ingemo källa), located between Skövde and Tidaholm, is a natural well where Ingemo was venerated according to legend, and which may originally have been a Pagan era holy site well. The well is walled with stone, its dimensions are 1,2 × 0,6 meter. It is covered with a limestone slab. The well was the goal of pilgrimages, where people offered coins for health into the 19th century. The earliest accounts of the customs at the well date from the late 17th century.

Modern genealogical speculation made her the mother of Inge but Ingemo cannot be reliably sourced as the same person as Ingamoder.

== Other sources ==
- Ohlmarks, Åke Alla Sveriges drottningar (AWE/Geber: 1976) Swedish
- Ohlmarks, Åke Alla Sveriges prinsessor (AWE/Geber: 1979) Swedish
