= Eric and Eric =

11th century Swedish monarchical contenders

Contenders for being king of Sweden
- Reign: c. 1066–1067
- Predecessor: Stenkil
- Successor: Halsten
- Died: c. 1067

Eric and Eric, according to Adam of Bremen, were two contenders for the kingship of Sweden around 1066–67, after the death of King Stenkil. They waged war on each other, with disastrous consequences: "[I]n this war all the Swedish magnates are said to have fallen. The two kings also perished then. When the entire royal clan was thus entirely extinct, conditions in the kingdom were changed and Christianity was disturbed to a high degree. The bishops that the Archbishop [of Bremen] had anointed for this land stayed back home due to fear of persecutions. Only the bishop in Scania took care of the churches of the Geats, and the Swedish Jarl Gnif strengthened his people in the Christian faith."

Nothing more is known about the two Erics, though some modern historians speculated that one of them was a Christian son of Stenkil, and the other a pagan; accordingly, they are sometimes assigned the invented names of Eric Stenkilsson and Eric the Heathen. No basis for those names can be substantiated from their own times and they are as such not considered historical. Despite only being mentioned by Adam of Bremen, and omitted in other sources on the period, it is likely that Eric and Eric themselves were historical figures as Adam of Bremen is unlikely to have invented figures so close to his own time of writing (the 1070s).

After Eric and Eric were dead, Halsten, son of King Stenkil, ascended to the throne.

Eric and Eric Died: c. 1067
Regnal titles
Preceded by Stenkil	Succeeded by Halsten
