= Västgötalagen =

Oldest (13th-c.) Swedish provincial law

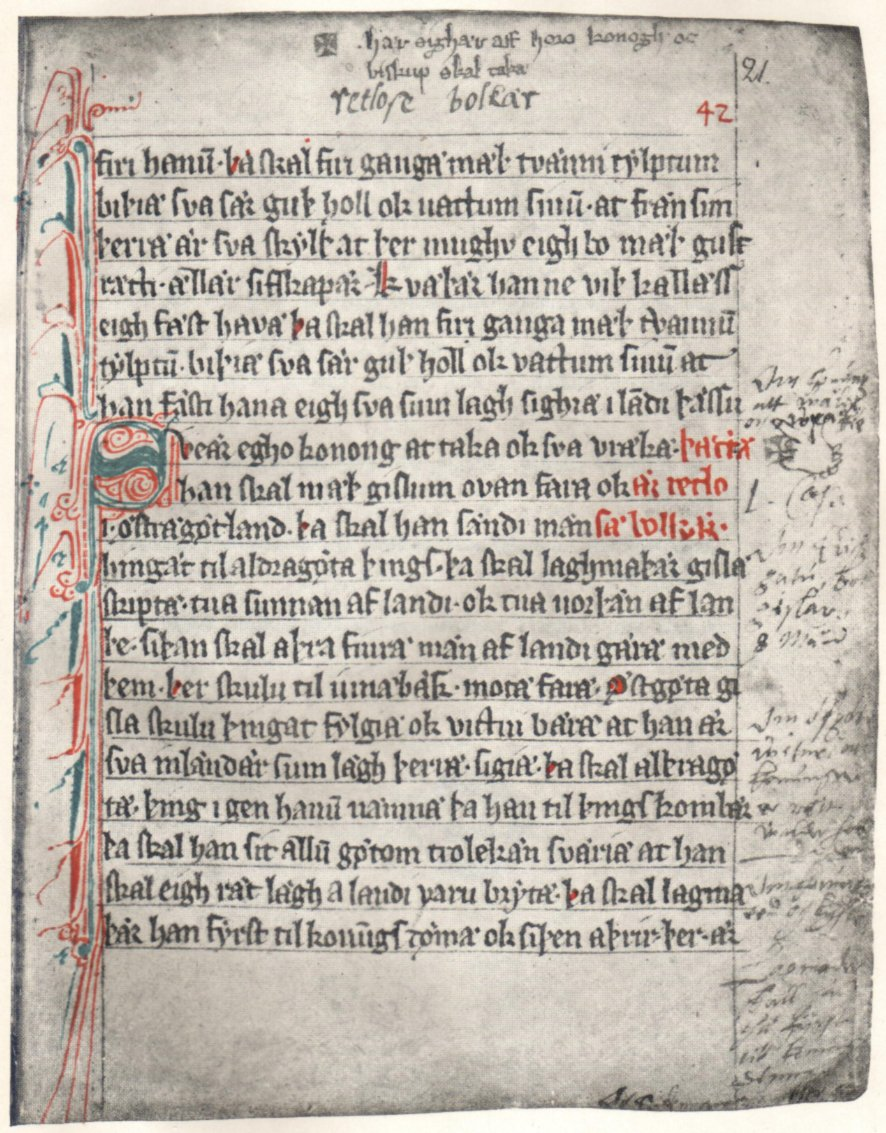
A page of the late 13th century law Äldre Västgötalagen.

Västgötalagen (Swedish pronunciation: [ˈvɛ̂ɧːœtaˌlɑːɡɛn] or [ˈvɛ̂sːtjøːta-]) or the Västgöta (Westrogothic) law is the oldest Swedish text written in Latin script and the oldest of all Swedish provincial laws. (Note: The Scanian law is older, but Scania was not incorporated into Sweden until late 17th century, and it is thus counted as a Danish law.) It was compiled in the early 13th century, probably at least partly at the instigation of Eskil Magnusson and was the code of law used in the provinces of Västergötland and Dalsland and in Mo härad during the latter half of that century. The earliest complete text is dated 1281. Small fragments of an older text have been dated 1250.

This legal code exists in two versions, Äldre Västgötalagen and Yngre Västgötalagen (the Elder and Younger Westrogothic law, respectively). A first printing in modern times was published by Hans Samuel Collin and Carl Johan Schlyter in 1827 (which made the text the subject of the earliest known stemma), and a new edition by Gösta Holm in 1976.

The oldest manuscript of Äldre Västgötalagen contains other material added by a priest called Laurentius in Vedum around 1325. This material is of varying nature, including notes on the border between Sweden and Denmark and lists of bishops in Skara, lawspeakers in Västergötland and Swedish kings. The latter begins with Olof Skötkonung and ends with Johan Sverkersson.

In these years, Swedish men left to enlist in the Byzantine Varangian Guard in such numbers that Västgötalagen declared no one could inherit while staying in "Greece"—the then Scandinavian term for the Byzantine Empire—to stop the emigration, especially as two other European courts simultaneously also recruited Scandinavians: Kievan Rus' c. 980–1060 and London 1018–1066 (the Þingalið).

== The Older Västgöta Law ==
The Older Västgöta Law, as other medieval Swedish laws was divided into balkar and then flockar. Below are the titles as indicated by rubrics in the Codex Holmiensis B 59; in one case, the rubric is clearly miswritten.

- Kirkiu bolkær - About the Church
- Af mandrapi - About Manslaughter
- Af særæmalum - About Wounds
- Af vaþæ sarum - About Accidental Wounds
- Bardaghæ bolkær - About Fights
- "Arþær bolkær" - About Non-Compensable Crimes
- Arfþær bolkær - About Inheritance
- Giptar bolkær - About Matrimony
- Retlösæ bolkær - About Lawlessness
- Iordþær bolkær - About Land
- Huru myulnu skal gæræ - How a Mill Shall Be Built
- Þiuuæ bolkær - About Thieves
- Fornæmix sakir - Cases of Illegal Appropriation
- Fornæmix bolkær - The Book of Illegal Appropriation
- Lecara rætar - Jester's rights

After this follows other headings in the manuscript, some of which are related to laws and some that are of the interests of an antiquarian.

== See also ==
- Geats
- Medieval Scandinavian law
- Stones of Mora
- Varangians
- Varangian Guard
