= Adam of Bremen =

11th-century German historian and chronicler

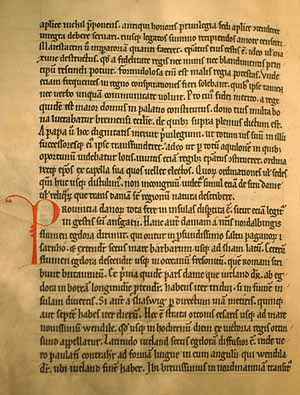
A facsimile of Adam of Bremen's magnum opus.

Adam of Bremen (Latin: Adamus Bremensis; German: Adam von Bremen; before 1050 – 12 October 1081/1085) was a German medieval chronicler. He lived and worked in the second half of the eleventh century. Adam is most famous for his chronicle Gesta Hammaburgensis ecclesiae pontificum (Deeds of Bishops of the Hamburg Church). He was "one of the foremost historians and early ethnographers of the medieval period".

In his chronicle, he included a chapter mentioning the Norse outpost of Vinland, and was thus the first European to write about the New World.

== Life ==
Little is known of his life other than hints from his own chronicles. He is believed to have come from Meissen, then its own margravate. The dates of his birth and death are uncertain, but he was probably born before 1050 and died on 12 October of an unknown year (possibly 1081, at the latest 1085). From his chronicles, it is apparent that he was familiar with a number of authors. The honorary name of Magister Adam shows that he had passed through all the stages of a higher education. It is probable that he was taught at the Magdeburger Domschule.

In 1066 or 1067, he was invited by Archbishop Adalbert von Hamburg-Bremen to join the Church of Bremen. Adam was accepted among the capitulars of Bremen, and by 1069 he appeared as director of the Bremen Cathedral's school. Soon thereafter he began to write the history of Bremen/Hamburg and of the northern lands in his Gesta.

His position and the missionary activity of the church of Bremen allowed him to gather information on the history and the geography of Northern Germany. A stay at the court of Sweyn II of Denmark gave him the opportunity to find information about the history and geography of Denmark and the other Scandinavian countries. Among other things he wrote about in Scandinavia were the sailing passages across Øresund such as today's Helsingør–Helsingborg ferry route.

== Sources ==
- Schmeidler, Bernhard, ed. (1917). Adam von Bremen: Hamburgische Kirchengeschichte. Hannover & Leipzig: Hahnsche Buchhandlung.
- Trillmich, Werner, ed. (1961). "Magistri Adam Bremensis, Gesta Hammaburgensis ecclesiae Pontificum: Adam von Bremen, Bischofsgeschichte der Hamburger Kirche". Quellen des 9. und 11. Jahrhunderts zur Geschichte der hamburgischen Kirche und des Reiches. Darmstadt: Wissenschaftliche Buchgesellschaft. pp. 135–503.
- Tschan, Francis J., ed. (1959). Adam of Bremen: History of the Archbishops of Hamburg-Bremen. New York: Columbia University Press.
