= Brynolf Algotsson =

Swedish Catholic

Blessed Brynolf Algotsson
- Bishop of Skara
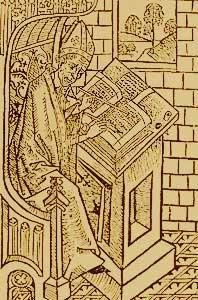
- Church: Roman Catholic Church
- Diocese: Skara
- See: Skara
- Appointed: 1278
- Installed: 1279
- Term ended: 6 February 1317
- Predecessor: Erik
- Successor: Peder Larsson

Orders
- Ordination: c. 1277
- Consecration: c. 1278

Personal details
- Born: Brynolf Algotsson c. 1240-1248 Västergötland, Sweden
- Died: 6 February 1317 (aged 68–77) Skara, Sweden
- Buried: Skara Cathedral
- Education: University of Paris

Sainthood
- Feast day: 6 February; 16 August
- Venerated in: Roman Catholic Church
- Beatified: 16 March 1492 (cultus confirmation); Saint Peter's Basilica, Papal States by Pope Alexander VI
- Attributes: Episcopal attire
- Patronage: Skara; Västergötland

Brynolf Algotsson (Italian: Brinolfo; c. 1240-1248 – 6 February 1317) was a Swedish Catholic prelate and theologian who served as the Bishop of Skara from 1278 until his death. He was descended from nobles and studied for almost two decades in Paris at the college there before returning to his homeland as a dean and canon prior to his episcopal nomination. He was diligent in his work in reforming the education of schools and the overall reorganization of his episcopal see. He was forced into a brief exile (with his father and some brothers imprisoned or killed in that time) but was able to continue his work upon his return.

Upon his death he was known to be hailed as a saint with dozens of miracles reported both during and after his life with some reported at the site of his tomb in the diocesan cathedral. There were several processes and commissions set up to collect testimonies and documents to support his cause for canonization with an appeal made to the Council of Constance to declare him as such; canonization did not occur during the council, but Pope Martin V encouraged and endorsed the cause. Pope Innocent VIII approved for his relics to be translated which occurred during the pontificate of his successor Pope Alexander VI on 16 August 1492 which acted as a "de facto" canonization despite the fact no formal canonization was celebrated despite attempts to convince the pontiff to do so.

== Life ==
Brynolf Algotsson was born in the 1240s or 1230s—but no later than 1248—in Västergötland as the second of eight sons born to the nobleman Algot Brynolfsson (1220-1302) and Margareta Petersdotter (b. 1235). His siblings were:

- Magnus (1259-1309)
- Karl (d. 1289)
- Folke (c. 1263–1310)
- Bengt (d. 1308)
- Rörik
- Peter
- Nils

He was educated in the cathedral school in Skara before being sent to pursue ecclesial studies in Paris at the college there for almost two decades where he heard the Dominican friar Thomas Aquinas give lectures. He became noted for his extensive learning as well as his background in canon law and overall theological studies. He also underwent philosophical studies and science while at the college. Upon his return to his homeland he was ordained to the priesthood and appointed as the dean for the Linköping chapter and the canon for Skara prior to being appointed as the Bishop of Skara in 1278 which Pope Nicholas III confirmed; he later received his episcopal consecration as a bishop around that time. He was enthroned in his episcopal see in the spring of 1279 and began his mission to renew his diocese. In 1281 he issued a charter which governed various tithes in addition to fining fellow prelates for various crimes committed should guilt be determined. In 1282–1283, he accompanied Bishop Henrik of Linköping on a pilgrimage to the Holy Land.

The bishop became active in the nation's political life and worked hard to ensure that the needs and the teachings of the Church became an integral focus of all public policies put forth. He also supported the work of the missionaries who had come to his diocese and the nation in general. Algotsson wrote various and extensive theological works in addition to poems for particular liturgical feasts. He created a special house in Paris for students from Skara. But his work soon ran afoul of the absolutist King Magnus Ladulås in 1288 which prompted him to flee into a brief exile to escape the monarch's retribution. His exile saw his father imprisoned and some brothers of his either killed or imprisoned. In 1289, King Magnus and Algotsson reconciled which allowed him to return to Skara to continue his work uninterrupted.

In 1304 he oversaw a thorn from Jesus Christ's Crown of Thorns brought to the Skara diocese at Lödöse due to close ties he shared with Norwegian prelates. This had been cultivated since the 1280s after he helped in the financing of the reconstruction of the Stavanger Cathedral which had been devastated in a fire. On 2 September 1304 he greeted a Norwegian ship and was presented with the thorn which was carried in solemn procession to the diocesan cathedral. This made his diocese a pilgrim destination that also generated revenue which Algotsson hoped to use to renovate the diocesan cathedral. He made 2 September the feast for the relic's reception and later wrote the "Historia de Spinea Corona" in order to describe how the thorn was gifted to his diocese.

The bishop became noted in life for having performed several miracles such as that it was said he turned water into wine on several occasions, much like Jesus Christ had done at the wedding in Cana.

He died in 1317 and his remains were interred in the Skara Cathedral. Bridget of Sweden visited his tomb on 2 February 1349 and there received a vision that revealed to her the holiness of the late bishop. In her vision she saw the Blessed Mother and Jesus Christ who also pointed out Algotsson's holiness to her, for she also saw bishop Brynolf in her vision. The Statute of Bishop Brynolf is accredited to him.

== Sainthood ==
King Erik of Pomerania appointed a commission in Skara in 1417 to collect documentation and testimonies (over 50 in total) needed for the late bishop with the cause being entrusted at some later point to Swedish monks who did additional research on the bishop's life and miracles; permission had been granted on 27 April 1416 for the process to be held which took place from 12 April 1417 until that 28 April. In 1414 the Archbishop of Uppsala Johannes Haquini and three other bishops (in addition to the Bishop of Lund Peder Kruse and the Bishop of Nidaros Eskil) wrote an application to the Council of Constance asking that he be canonized. Pope Martin V confirmed the cause would continue and provided his encouragement as to the cause's continuation. There were 34 miracles recorded between 1404 and 1417 either in Skara or Lödöse as the process determined.

In 1492 additional documentation was collected for submission to Pope Innocent VIII with the intention of having Algotsson canonized in 1498. But Innocent VIII's death in 1492 hindered this to a significant degree. But Innocent VIII had given permission not long before his death for Algotsson's relics to be translated and a liturgical feast in his name affixed to that date. This took place during the pontificate of his successor Pope Alexander VI on 16 August 1492 (who had just been elected a week prior) which acted as a sort of "de facto" canonization even though no formal sanctification was celebrated and no official papal bull subscribed.

Hemming Gadd—on the behalf of Sten Sture the Elder—spoke to Pope Alexander VI on the subject of the canonization of the bishop and told the pontiff that it would be good for the Swedish church for four Swedish Blesseds such as Hemming of Turku to be canonized. This request was repeated in 1499 since no progress had been made and on 16 March 1499 the pope granted permission for a second translation of relics. This never occurred.
