= Chronological list of saints and blesseds in the 14th century =

A list of people, who died during the 14th century, who have received recognition as Blessed (through beatification) or Saint (through canonization) from the Catholic Church:

Name	Birth	Birthplace	Death	Place of death	Notes
Blessed Giacomo Bianconi	1220	Mevania	1301	Mevania	
Blessed James of Bevagna	1220		1301		
Gertrude the Great	1256		1302		
Blessed Andrew Segni (of Anagni)			1302		
Ivo of Kermartin (Yves, Yvo)	1253		1303		
Blessed Benedict XI	1240		1304		pope
Blessed John Pelingotto	1240		1304		
Blessed Peter Armengol	1238		1304		
Blessed Peter of Treja			1304		
Nicholas of Tolentino	1245		1305		
Blessed Joachim of Siena	1258		1305		
Blessed Santucia			1305		
Blessed Angelo of Borgo San Sepolcro			1306		
Blessed Conrad of Offida	1237		1306		
Blessed Jacopone of Todi	1230		1306		
Blessed Jane of Orvieto			1306		
Albert of Trapani			1307		
Blessed Jane	1244		1307		
Clare of Montefalco	1268		1308		
Blessed James of Viterbo			1308		
Blessed Alda (Aldobrandesca)	1249		1309		
Blessed Angela of Foligno	1248		1309		
Blessed Augustine Novello			1309		
Blessed Beatrice of Ornacieu	1260		1309		
Blessed Matthew of Eskandely			1309		
Alexis Falconieri, one of the Seven Founders of the Servites			1310		
Humility (Humilitas)(Roxanne)	1226		1310		
Mechtilde (Mithilda)			1310		
Blessed Oringa (Christiana)	1237		1310		
Blessed Jordan of Pisa	1260		1311		
Blessed Christina of Stommeln	1242		1312		
Notburga	1265		1313		
Blessed Emily Bicchieri	1238		1314		
Blessed James Salomoni	1231		1314		
Andrew Dotti			1315		
Blessed Bonaventure Buonaccorsi	1240		1315		
Blessed Henry of Treviso			1315		
Blessed Raymond Lull (Ramon Llull or Lullus)	1232		1316		
Agnes of Montepulciano			1317		
Brynoth			1317		
Blessed Justina of Arezzo	1257		1319		
Blessed Matthia of Matelica	1252		1319		
Blessed Simon of Rimini	1250		1319		
Blessed Bernard of Toulouse			1320		
Blessed Margaret of Castello	1287		1320		
Blessed Raynald of Ravenna			1321		
Blessed Thomas of Tolentino	1260		1321		
Blessed Francis Veninbeni of Fabriano	1251		1322		
Blessed John of La Verna	1259		1322		
Peter Cresci			1323		
Blessed Augustine Kazotic	1262		1323		
Blessed Angelo of Gualdo	1265		1325		
Blessed Angelo of Furcio			1327		
Roch, (Rocco, Roque)	1295		1327		
Blessed Francis Arrighetto			1328		
Blessed Frederick of Regensburg			1329		
Blessed Roselina			1329		
Blessed Bartholomew of Montepulciano			1330		
Blessed John Rainuzzi			1330		
Blessed Odoric of Pordenone			1331		
Blessed Giacomo Benefatti		Mantua	1332	Mantua	
Blessed James Benefatti O.P.			1332		
Blessed Imelda Lambertini	1322		1333		
Elizabeth of Portugal	1271		1336		
Blessed Maurice of Hungary	1281		1336		
Jorandus			1340		
Blessed Gentilis			1340		
Juliana of Falconieri	1270		1341		
Anthony			1342		
Blessed Gregory of Verucchio	1225		1343		
Peregrine Laziosi	1260	Forli, Italy	1345	Forli, Italy	
Blessed Thomas Corsini			1345		
Venturino of Bergamo			1346		
Blessed Clare of Rimini	1282		1346		
Flora of Beaulieu	1309		1347		
Claritus			1348		
Blessed Bartholomea			1348		
Blessed Bernard Tolomei	1272		1348		
Blessed Silvester of Valdiseve			1348		
Blessed Ricard Rolle de Hampole	1300		1349		
Bertram of St. Genesius	1258	Gascony	1350		Bishop of Aquileia
Francis of Pesaro			1350		
Blessed John of Rieti			1350		
Blessed Margaret Ebner	1291		1351		
Blessed Agnes of Bavaria	1345		1352		
Conrad Confalonieri of Piacenza	1290		1354		
Blessed Michelina of Pesaro	1300		1356		
Salaun (Salomon)			1358		
Blessed Gertrude of Delft			1358		
Elzear of Sabran and Blessed Delphine of Sabran	1323		1360		
Blessed Vilana of Florence	1332		1360		
Blessed Villana of Botti	1332		1361		
Blessed Charles of Blois	1320		1364		
Blessed Henry Suso	1295		1366		
Peter Thomas, Latin Patriarch of Constantinople	1305		1366		
Sibyllina of Pavia	1287		1367		
Blessed Jane Soderini	1301		1367		
Blessed John Colombini	1300		1367		
Blessed Julia of Certaldo			1367		
Blessed Ugolino of Cortona	1320		1367		
Paula			1368		
Anthony of Saxony, Gregory of Tragurio, Nicholas of Hungary, Thomas of Foligno, and Ladislas of Hungary			1369		
Blessed William of Toulouse	1297		1369		
Vitalis of Assisi			1370		
Blessed Urban V	1310		1370		pope
Andrew Corsini	1302		1373		Bishop of Fiesole
Bridget of Sweden	1303		1373		
Blessed Hugolino Magalotti			1373		
Blessed Antonio Pavoni	1326		1374		
John of Bridlington	1319		1379		
Aventanus			1380		
Catherine of Siena	1347		1380		
Blessed Avertanus and Romaeus			1380		
Blessed John of Vallombrosa			1380		
Catherine of Sweden	1330		1381		
Blessed John of Ruysbroeck	1293		1381		
Blessed Mir of Canzo	1306		1381		
Blessed Panacea de'Muzzi of Quarona (Panassia, Panexia)	1378		1383		
Blessed Roland of Medicis			1386		
Blessed Peter of Luxembourg	1369		1387		Bishop of Metz
Nikola Tavelic of Sibenik and companions			1391		
Blessed Castora Gabriella			1391		
Blessed Guido			1391		
Blessed Nicholas Hermansson	1331		1391		Bishop of Linköping
Sergius of Radonezh			1392		
John Nepomucene			1393		
Dorothea of Montau	1347		1394		
Margaret the Barefooted	1350		1395		
Blessed John of Cetina			1397		
Blessed Marcolino of Forli	1317		1397		
Blessed Peter de Duenas	1378		1397		
Blessed Anthony of Hungary			1398		
Jadwiga of Poland	1374		1399		
Blessed Raymond of Capua			1399		
Blessed Oddino of Fossano	1334		1400		

== See also ==
- Christianity in the 14th century
