= Lars-Göran Lönnermark =

Swedish priest and bishop of the Church of Sweden

The Right Reverend Lars-Göran Lönnermark
- Bishop of Skara
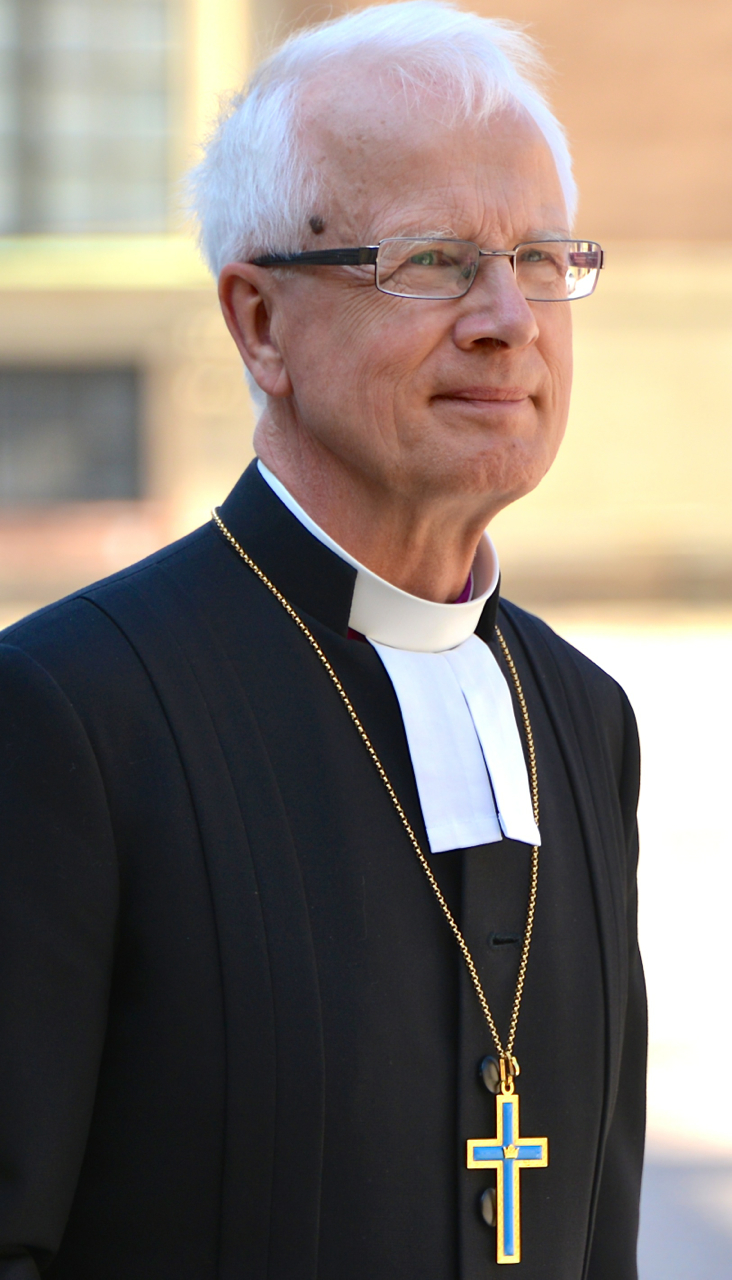
- Church: Church of Sweden
- Diocese: Skara
- Elected: 1989
- In office: 1989–2004
- Predecessor: Karl-Gunnar Grape
- Successor: Erik Aurelius

Orders
- Ordination: 1964 by Sven Danell
- Consecration: 9 April 1989 by Bertil Werkström

Personal details
- Born: 26 August 1939 (age 86) Örgryte, Sweden
- Denomination: Lutheran
- Spouse: Karin Rodén (1963–1987); Elisabeth Håstrand (since 1989)
- Motto: Herren är herden
- Coat of arms

Lars-Göran Lönnermark, born 26 August 1939, is a Swedish bishop emeritus.

Lönnermark studied at Michigan State University in 1958–1959 through the international exchange program, where he became a member of Delta Upsilon fraternity. After returning to Sweden, he studied theology and was ordained as a pastor in the Evangelical Lutheran Church (Church of Sweden) in 1964.

He was bishop of Skara between 1989 and 2004. In 1988, he was named as high predicate of the congregation in Stockholm, and on 1 April 2007 as head predicate. Lars-Göran Lönnermark took over from head predicate Henrik Svenungsson, bishop emeritus of Stockholm.

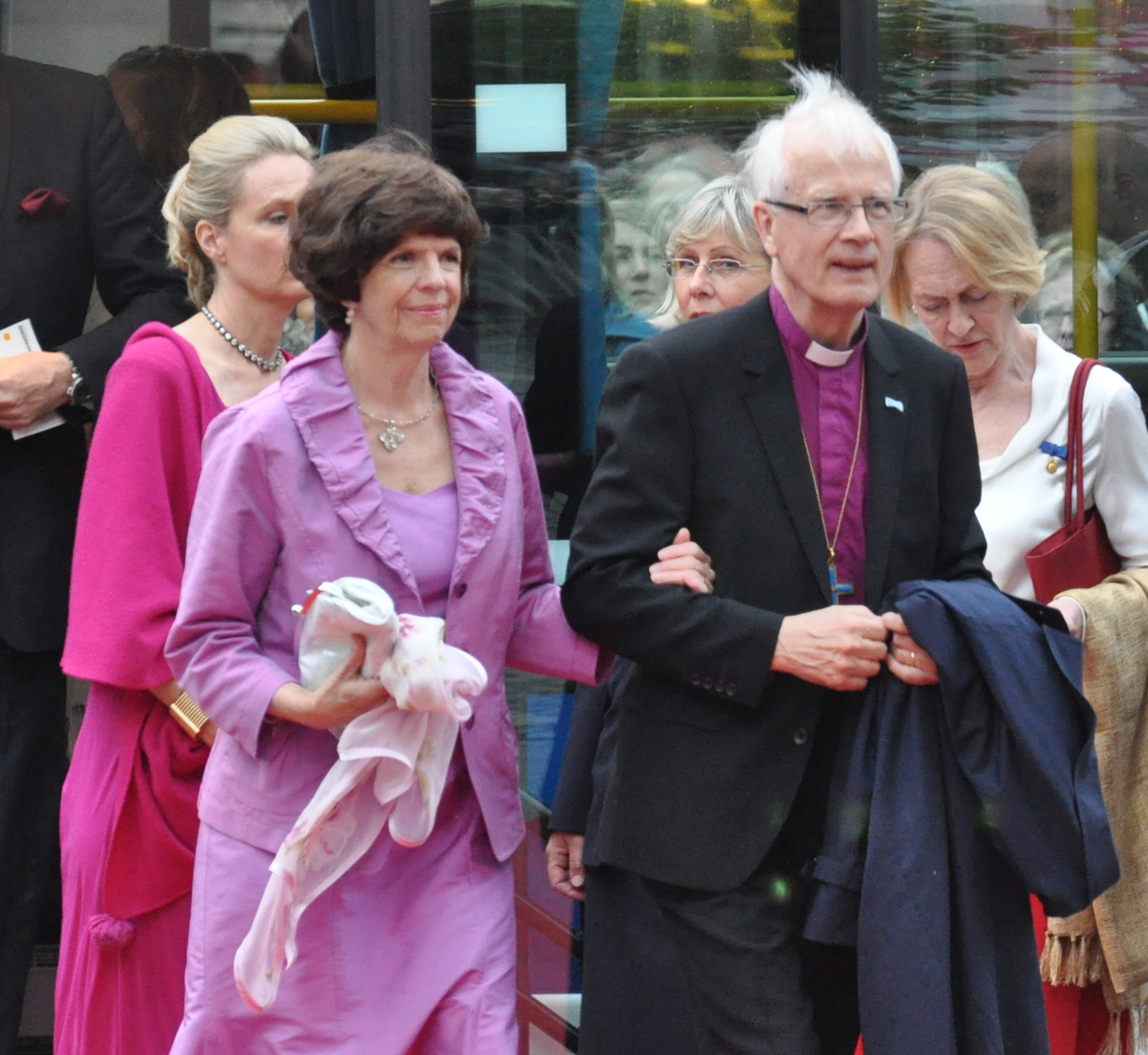
Wedding of Victoria, Crown Princess of Sweden, and Daniel Westling; Arrival of members for the Government and Swedish and foreign guests of honour to the Riksdag's Gala Performance at Konserthuset. Bishop Emeritus Lars-Göran Lönnermark and his wife Elisabeth Lönnermark.

Lönnermark took part in the wedding of Victoria, Crown Princess of Sweden, and Daniel Westling on 19 June 2010.
