= Skara Missal =

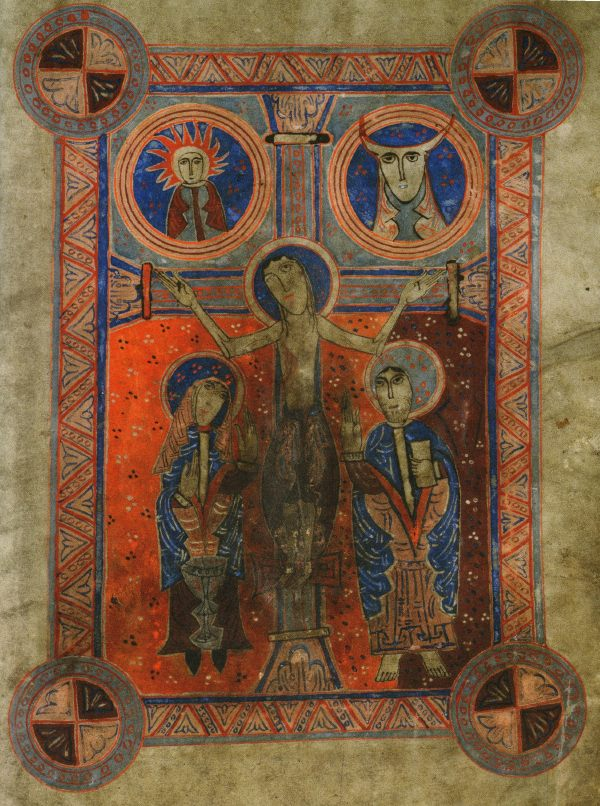
Illumination depicting the Crucifixion from the Skara Missal

The Skara Missal is a 12th-century illuminated manuscript, a missal kept in Stifts- och landsbiblioteket i Skara, a library in Skara, Sweden. It is the oldest surviving missal of this kind in Scandinavia. It is written in Latin, and is in folio format. Only about one eighth of the original remains, or 44 pages. The book was originally bound in a single volume, but is since the 13th or 14th century split into two volumes. One of the volumes is currently part of the permanent exhibition of Västergötland Museum. It was written by two different scribes. It contains text, illuminations and musical notes. The illuminations consist of two full page illustrations, four large decorative initials and a number of smaller ones. Certain traits indicate that the illuminator may have come from Scandinavia.

The Skara Missal is sometimes referred to as "Sweden's oldest book" but its origins remain unclear. It may have been made in Winchester (England), Normandy (France), or possibly Norway; it mentions the saint Swithun who was venerated in both England and Norway. Studies of its contents have pointed to possible connections with other illuminated manuscripts from Fulda (Germany), Echternach (Luxembourg), Winchcombe (England) as well as French manuscripts. The missal is mentioned in the catalogue of the library in Skara for the first time in 1748, but according to the Skara Stiftshistoriska Sällskap (Skara Diocese Historical Society) it has belonged to the Diocese of Skara since the Middle Ages.

A team of researchers from the University of Lund has dated the pages of the missal to the mid-12th century, using radiocarbon dating techniques. This makes the book contemporaneous to the inauguration of Skara Cathedral. The book is bound in covers made of oak wood covered with leather, which in turn have been dated to 1264 using dendrochronology; the researchers' analysis also determined that the oak trees used grew in the vicinity of Skara.

The book has been displayed in international exhibitions, e.g. in Paris and Copenhagen, and has attracted the interest of both art historians and church historians. In 2006, a facsimile edition, supplemented by a number of scholarly articles, was published.

== Bibliography ==
- Pahlmblad, Christer (2006). Skaramissalet: studier, edition, översättning och faksimil av handskriften (in Swedish). 9789185980277: St f utg av Skaramissalet. ISBN 9789185980277.
