= Henrik (bishop of Linköping) =

13th-century catholic bishop in Sweden

Henrik (died 1283) was the bishop of Linköping in Sweden from 1258 until his death.

Henrik was probably from Söderköping. He was a cousin of Bishop Lars I and of German background. He studied at the Abbey of Saint-Victor in Paris. At the time of William of Modena's legation in November 1247, he was a magister and had recently been made a canon of Linköping Cathedral.

Henrik succeeded Lars as bishop in 1258. He was an energetic bishop, familiar with French intellectual and continental architectural trends. He continued the work on the cathedral begun by Bishop Bengt Magnusson around 1230. In 1280, he obtained from King Magnus Ladulås a financial concession to finance the construction.

In 1279, the papal collector Bertrand Amalric visited Sweden demanding the extraordinary six-year crusading tithe as laid down by the Second Council of Lyon. Henrik offered instead to take a crusade vow and visit the Holy Land in person. Pope Nicholas III confirmed that he could keep the tithes for his own expedition. In the summer of 1282, Henrik set out on his pilgrimage joined by the entire chapter of Linköping Cathedral, by Bishop Brynjolf Algotsson of Skara and by many knights. The party travelled overland. It was in Bruges in September 1282. It probably wintered in Paris, where Henrik had studied. In Marseille, Henrik fell ill. On 11 April 1283, he made a will in the hospital of the Dominican convent. He recovered enough to fulfill his vow, and was in Acre by 28 June. On 27 August, he made a codicil to his will. He died in Acre and was buried there in the Franciscan house. His grave was destroyed after the fall of Acre in 1291. He was the second bishop of Linköping to die in the Holy Land after Kol, who died in Jerusalem in 1196.

== Bibliography ==
- Lamm, Carl Johan [in Swedish] (1941). Oriental Glass of Mediaeval Date Found in Sweden and the Early History of Lustre Painting. Kungl. Vitterhets Historie och Antikvitets Akademiens Handlingar.
- Mayer, Hans Eberhard (2008). "Ein Bischof geht einkaufen: Heinrich von Linköping im Heiligen Land". Zeitschrift des Deutschen Palästina-Vereins. 124 (1): 51–60. JSTOR 27931829.
- Mayer, Hans Eberhard (2012). "Two Crusaders Out of Luck". Crusades. 11: 159–171.
- Pringle, Denys (2021). "Scandinavian Pilgrims and the Churches of the Holy Land in the Twelfth and Thirteenth Centuries". In Kristin B. Aavitsland; Line M. Bonde (eds.). Tracing the Jerusalem Code, Volume 1: The Holy City Christian Cultures in Medieval Scandinavia (ca. 1100–1536). De Gruyter. pp. 198–217.
- Schück, Herman [in Swedish] (1969–1971). "Henrik (biskop)". Svenskt biografiskt lexikon. Vol. 18. p. 653.
