= Bero Magni de Ludosia =

Swedish scholar

Bero Magni de Ludosia or Björn Magnusson from Lödöse (died 1465) was a Swedish-born scholar, active at the University of Vienna. He was the owner of the largest private library in medieval Sweden. An ink portrait of him preserved in the Bavarian State Library is also the oldest known depiction of a Swedish scholar.

== Biography ==
He was born in Lödöse, probably at the beginning of the 15th century. In 1429 he was enrolled as a student at the University of Vienna, in the Saxon nation. In 1433 he obtained the degree of regent master, entitled to give lectures at the university. He stayed as a teacher at the university until 1464. Most of his activity at the university was connected with the faculty of philosophy, and he gave lectures on logic, moral philosophy, natural sciences, geometry and mathematics, all subjects which at the time were taught at the faculty of philosophy. A particular interest in the philosophy of Aristotle appears evident from his lectures; other lectures are on the works of Johannes de Sacrobosco and Peter of Spain. In addition, he began studying theology during the 1430s, but abandoned these studies after a conflict within the university in 1442. Despite not finishing his theological studies, he apparently upheld an interest in the field and occasionally taught at the faculty of theology. In 1449 he was also made a titular dean at the Diocese of Skara in his native Sweden, a purely formal position but which entailed a higher salary. His position there was questioned by Kort Rogge but apparently without any success. He was also made a canon at St. Stephen's Cathedral in Vienna in 1464. In 1460, he was elected Bishop of Skara, but he never left Vienna and did not take up his position at Skara Cathedral. The election was annulled in 1465. He died in Vienna the same year.

== Legacy and library ==
Bero was remembered as a scholar in his native country and is mentioned by Olaus Magnus. An ink drawing depicting him, made by one of his students, is preserved in a manuscript containing works by him today in the Bavarian State Library and is the oldest known depiction of a Swedish scholar.

Following the wishes in his last will, his book collection was donated to the Diocese of Skara after his death. The books remained in Vienna until 1472 due to an ongoing war in Sweden. A catalogue of the works donated, probably made in Vienna some time after his death, has been preserved. The book collection contained an estimated 138 works, with a focus on scholasticism. The single author represented with most works in the library is Thomas Aquinas. His library is the largest medieval book collection known to have been owned by a person connected to Sweden. There was no comparable private book collection in medieval Sweden; by European standards the collection was sizeable.

== Works cited ==
- Carlsson, Gottfrid (1918). "Vårt största enskilda medeltidsbibliotek och dess ägare". Nordisk tidskrift för bok- och biblioteksväsen (in Swedish) (V): 228–238.
- Carlsson, Gottfrid (1922). "Mäster Beros av Lödöse bibliotek". Nordisk tidskrift för bok- och biblioteksväsen (in Swedish) (IX): 129–142.
- Lindroth, Sten (1975). Svensk lärdomshistoria. Medeltiden - Reformationstiden (in Swedish). Stockholm: Norstedts. ISBN 91-1-754072-0.
- Nordin, Jonas, ed. (2022). Kodex. Boken i medeltidens Sverige (PDF) (in Swedish). Lund: Mediehistoriskt Arkiv. ISBN 978-91-985800-7-5.
