= Diocese of Mariestad =

Coordinates: 58°42′N 13°49′E

The Diocese of Mariestad (Swedish: Mariestads stift) was a division of the Church of Sweden between 1583–1646. The diocese was never an episcopal see, as it was under the supervision of a superintendent rather than a bishop. Mariestad Cathedral is thus the only church building in Sweden to have gained the rank of cathedral despite never having been the seat of a bishop. (Kalmar Cathedral was the seat of a bishop until 1915, when the diocese of Kalmar was absorbed by the diocese of Växjö.) In 1646, the superintendent moved to Karlstad and the diocese of Mariestad was absorbed into that of Skara.
