= Statute of Bishop Brynolf =

The Statute of Bishop Brynolf (Swedish: Biskop Brynolf stadga) was an appendix to the Västgötalagen law. The statute was issued in 1281 by Bishop Brynolf approved by the diocese of the cathedral chapter Skara. The charter commences by Magnus III of Sweden having consulted the cathedral chapter issued decrees concerning the disunity between clerics and laypeople in regards to the church. The charter was concerned with:

(1) payment of crop tithes and tithes from the living and punishments for those who did not pay; (2) capital tithes that should be paid from the whole of the capital, real as well as movable property, at special occasions, such as division of an estate, marriage, and the consecration of the parish church; (3) manslaughter and injury of another, along with applicable punishment if such crimes were committed, for instance, in places and on feast days especially important for the diocese of Skara (the fines should go to the bishop); (4) breaking the holy day by working on specifically mentioned feast days--in these cases, too, (the fines should go to the bishop) (5) fines that should go to the bishop if people 'committed sins' by having illegal sexual relations, which were specified; among those mentioned are homosexual love-affairs, although the term is not used.

== See also ==
- History of Sweden
- Diocese of Skara
- Västgötalagen
