= Adalvard the Elder =

German clergyman (died c. 1064)

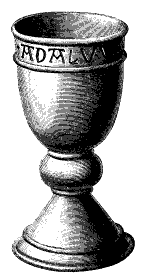
Adalvard's grave chalice

Adalvard the Elder (died c. 1064) was a German clergyman. He was first the dean of Bremen, but he was sent to the diocese of Skara in Sweden, as bishop during the early 1060s. Adam of Bremen wrote well of him, and tells that he made missionary attempts in Värmland. In Skara Cathedral a chalice was found with the inscription Adalwardus Peccator (Adalvard the sinner). He was succeeded by Adalvard the Younger.

== Literature ==
- Tegnér, Göran (1995), "Adalvard d ä", Vikingatidens ABC, Swedish Museum of National Antiquities, ISBN 91-7192-984-3, archived from the original on 2007-09-01
- Tegnér, Göran (1995), "Adalvardskalken", Vikingatidens ABC, archived from the original on 2007-09-02
