= Mariestad Cathedral =

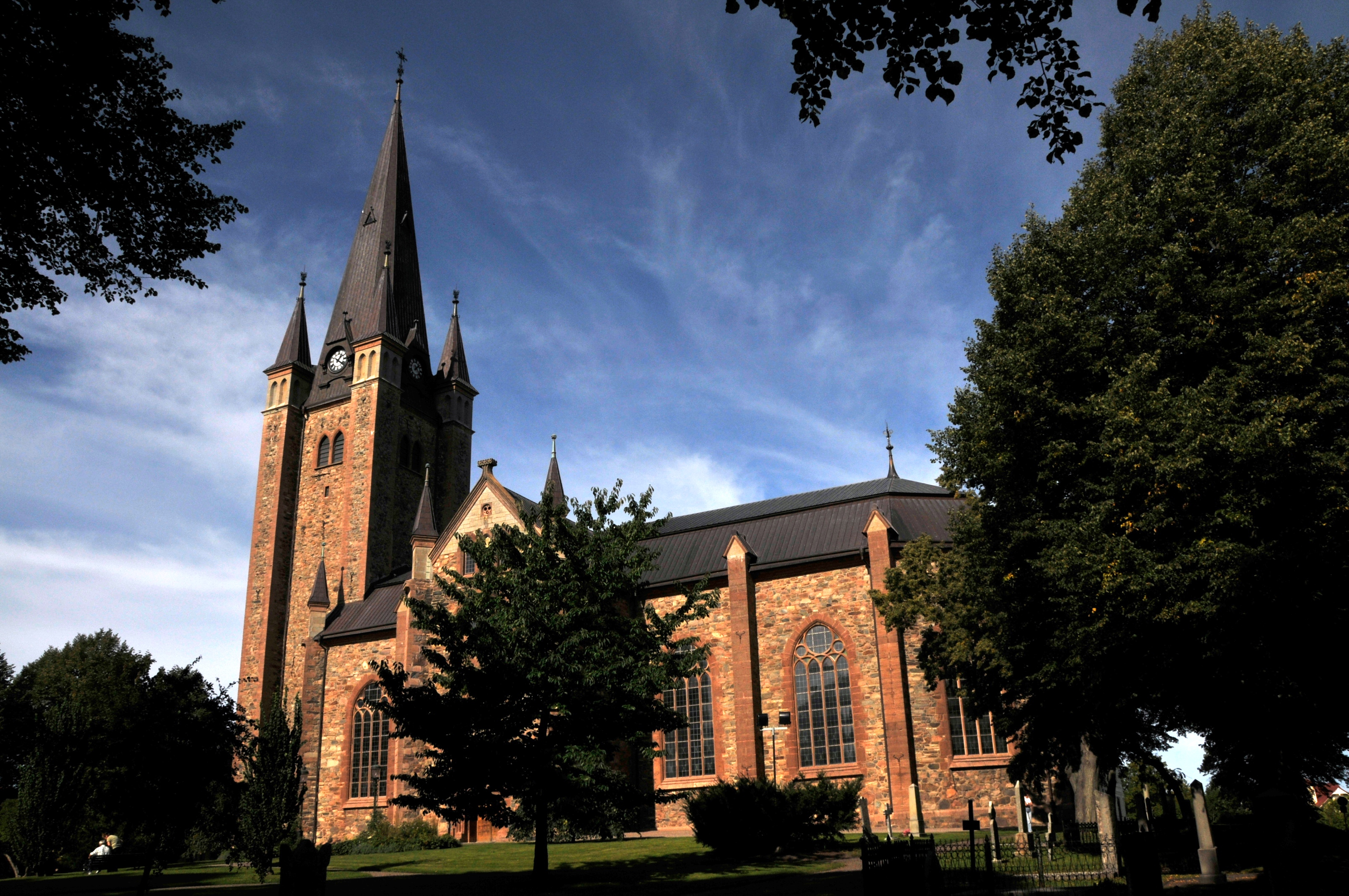
- Mariestad Cathedral
- Mariestad Cathedral
- 58°42′45″N 13°49′20″E
- Location: Mariestad
- Country: Sweden
- Denomination: Church of Sweden

Administration
- Diocese: Diocese of Skara

Mariestad Cathedral (Swedish: Mariestads domkyrka) is a cathedral in Mariestad, Sweden. It belongs to the Diocese of Skara of the Church of Sweden.

== History ==
The building was built between 1593 and 1619. It was dedicated in 1625. The floorplan is a four-bay aisleless late Gothic church with a hint of transepts. The unpainted natural stone facades and tower spire were first added in 1905 at a restoration directed by Folke Zettervall. The Baroque altarpiece and pulpit were made in 1701 by Börje Löfman. The freestanding limestone altar was added during the restoration of 1958-1959 under the direction of Rolf Bergh (1919-2005). In 1938, Frobenius Orgelbyggeri built a new pneumatic organ with partially recycled pipe material.

== Gallery ==
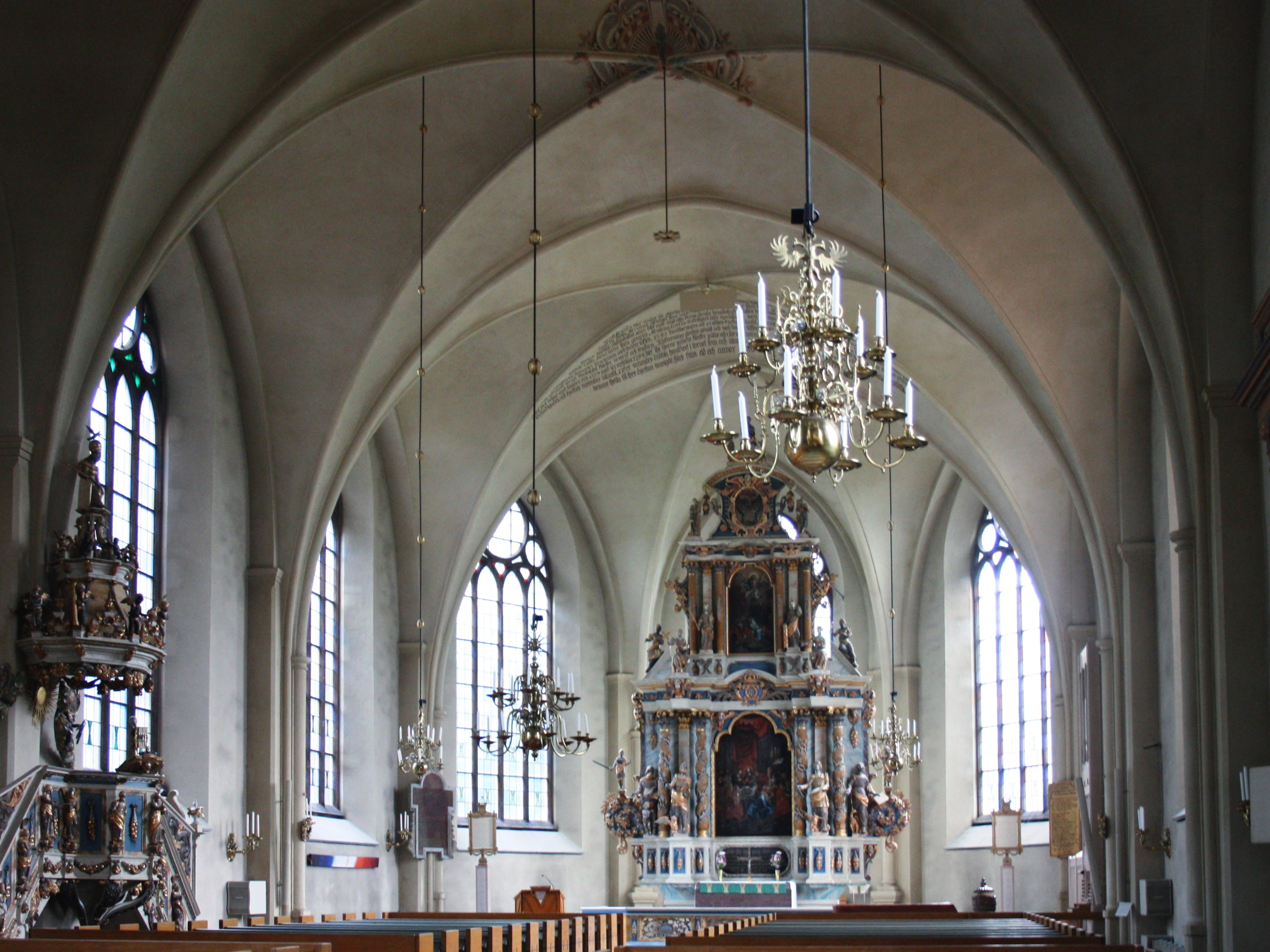
Interior

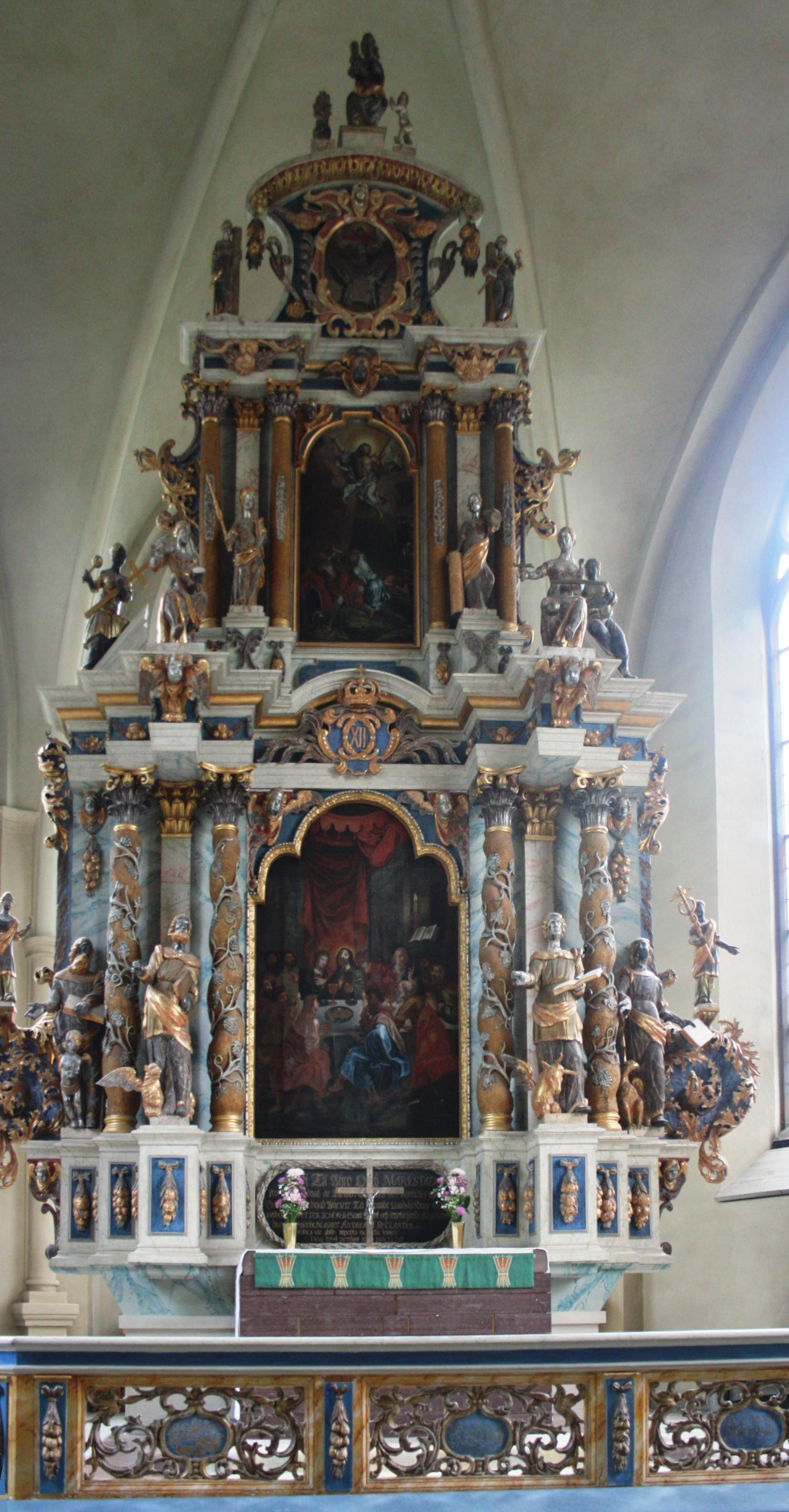
Altar

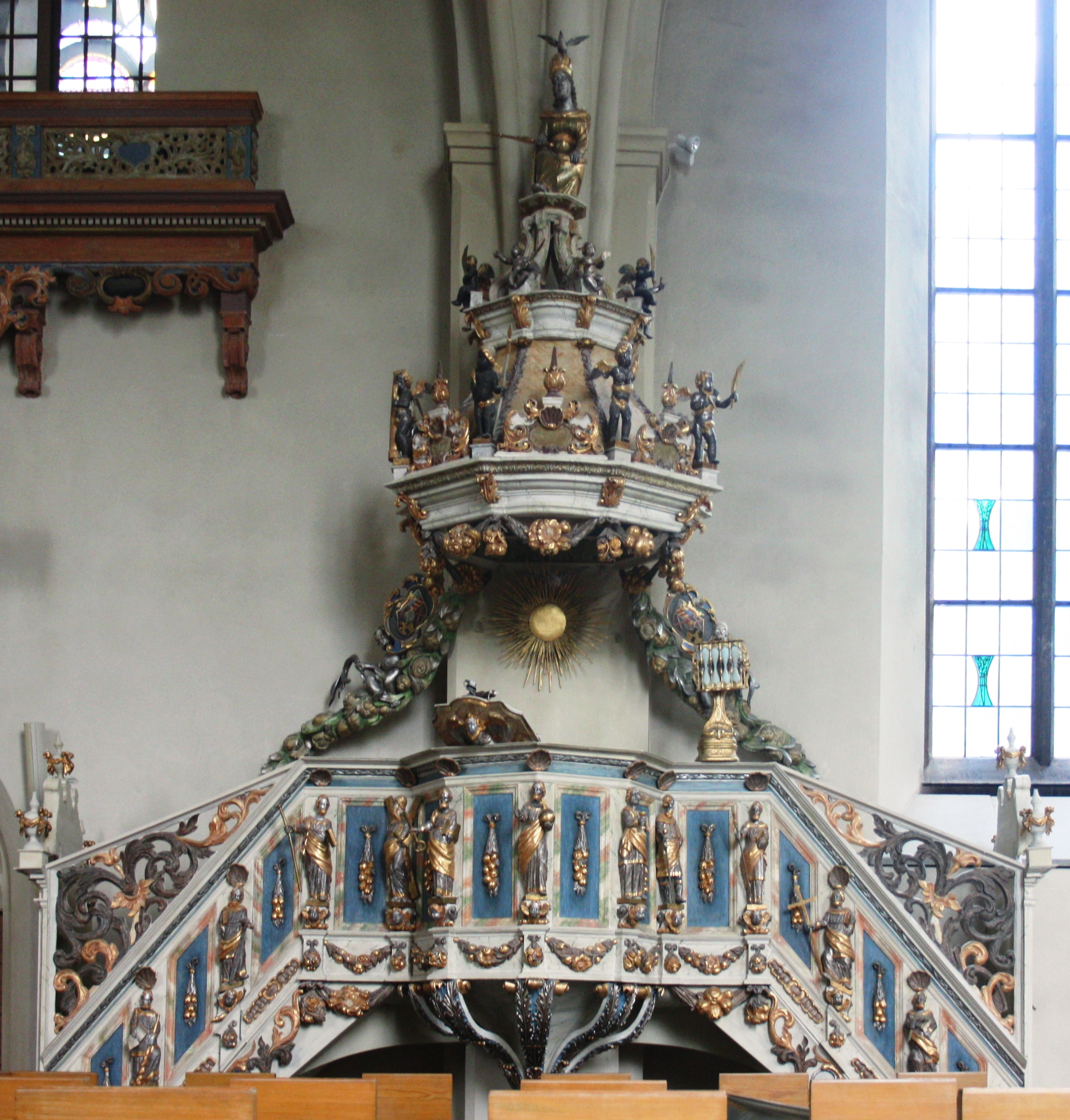
Pulpit

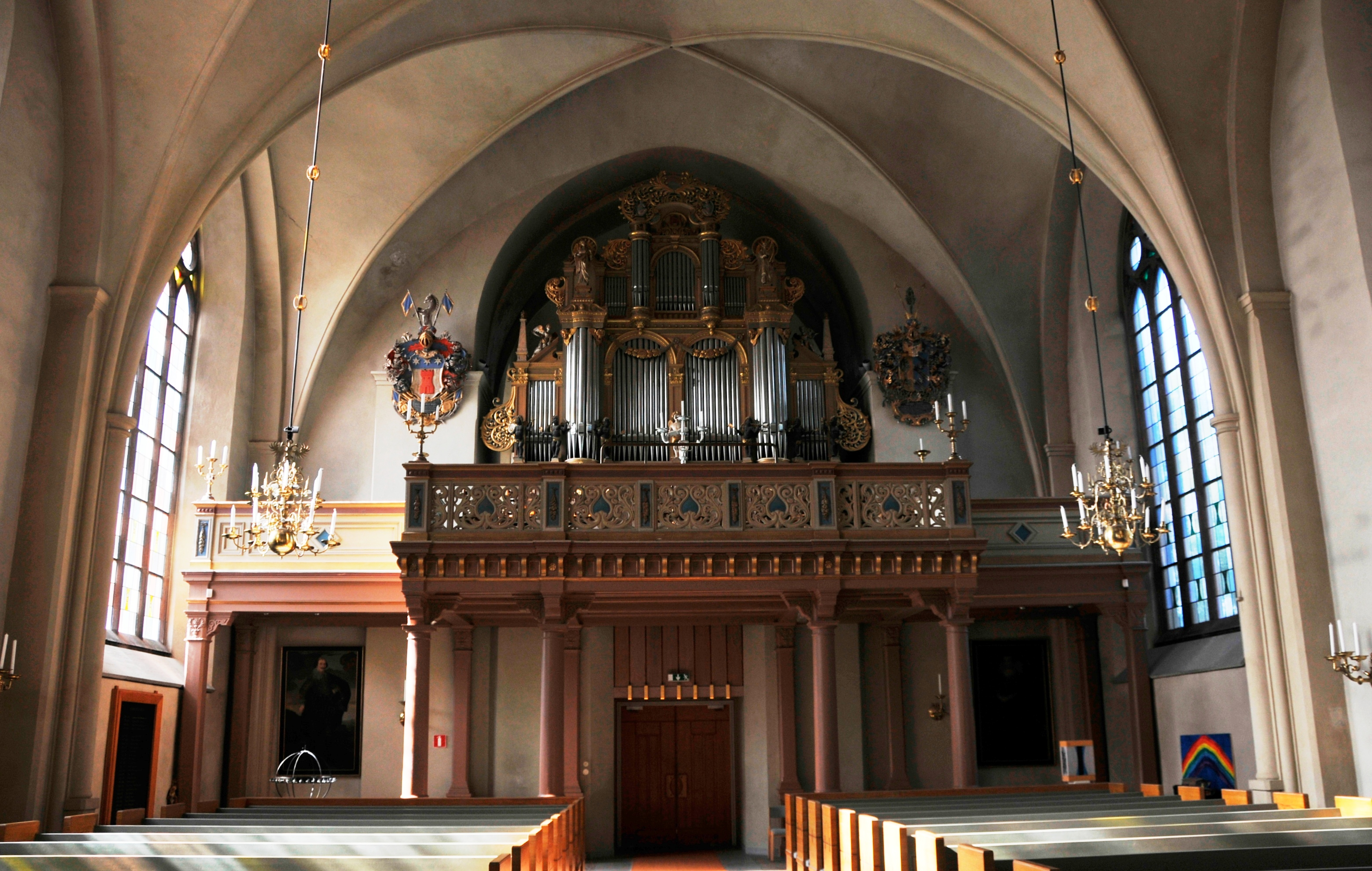
Organ
