= Adalvard the Younger =

11th century German missionary bishop

Adalvard the Younger (dead before 1072) was a German missionary bishop from Bremen who was active in Sigtuna, in Sweden, in the 1060s. According to Adam of Bremen, Adalvard tried to make the Swedish king Stenkil close the great temple at Uppsala. This attempt failed and so Adalvard had to flee to Västergötland, where he could succeed his namesake Adalvard the Elder in Skara. Adalvard later returned to Bremen where he stayed in June 1069. Adam of Bremen cites Adalvard as his source concerning Swedish matters.

== Literature ==
- Tegnér, Göran (1995), "Adalvard d y", Vikingatidens ABC, Swedish Museum of National Antiquities, ISBN 91-7192-984-3, archived from the original on 2007-09-02
