= Peter of Luxembourg =

Peter of Luxembourg may refer to:

- Peter of Luxembourg (bishop) (1369–1387), saint
- Peter I, Count of Saint-Pol (died 1433)
- Peter II, Count of Saint-Pol (died 1482)
