= Sven Danell =

Swedish prelate

The Right Reverend Sven Danell
- Bishop of Skara
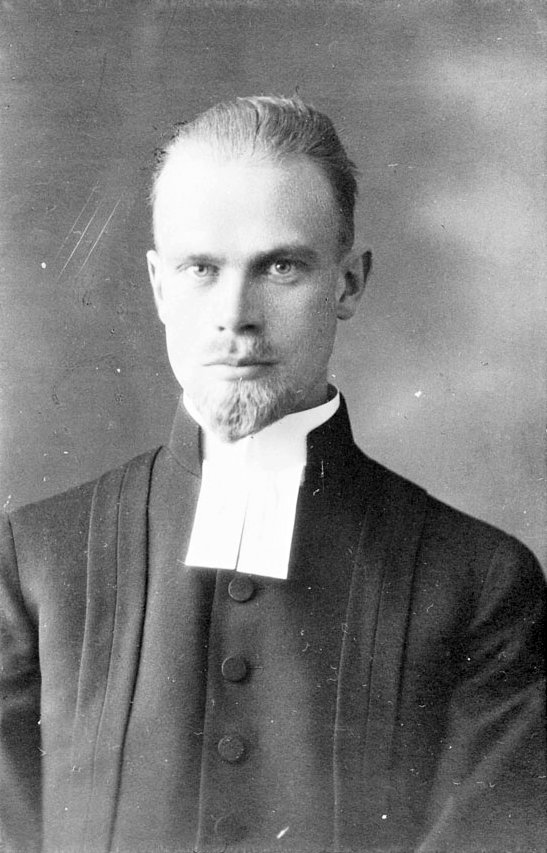
- Church: Church of Sweden
- Diocese: Skara
- Appointed: 27 July 1955
- In office: 1955–1969
- Predecessor: Yngve Rudberg
- Successor: Helge Brattgård

Orders
- Ordination: 10 June 1928
- Consecration: 18 March 1956 by Yngve Brilioth

Personal details
- Born: 25 November 1903 Uppsala, Sweden
- Died: 18 January 1981 (aged 77) Stockholm, Sweden
- Buried: Skånings-Åsaka cemetery
- Denomination: Lutheran
- Parents: Hjalmar Danell and Maria Beckman
- Spouse: Miriam Helén
- Children: 6
- Motto: Verbum crucis Dei virtus
- Coat of arms

Sven Isak Danell (25 November 1903 - 18 January 1981) was a Swedish prelate who served as Bishop of Skara between 1955 and 1969.

== Biography ==
Danell was born on 25 November 1903 in Uppsala, Sweden. His father, Hjalmar Danell, was Bishop of Skara between 1905 and 1935, while his uncle, Gideon Danell, was a notable Swedish teacher and linguist. Danell studied religion and linguistics at the universities of Gothenburg, Uppsala and Lund. He was ordained priest on 10 June 1928. He was appointed to a congregation in Skara while in 1933 he became vicar of St Catherine's Church in Noarootsi in present-day Estonia. In 1937 he returned to Sweden and became vicar of Källby Church. Between 1941 and 1949 he served as vicar of Västra Tunhems Church.

On 27 July 1955 Danell was appointed Bishop of Skara and was consecrated on 18 March 1956 by Archbishop Yngve Brilioth. He retained the post till 1969. He was married to Miriam Helén and had six children.
