= Michelina of Pesaro =

Italian Roman Catholic Franciscan tertiary

Blessed Michelina of Pesaro TOSF
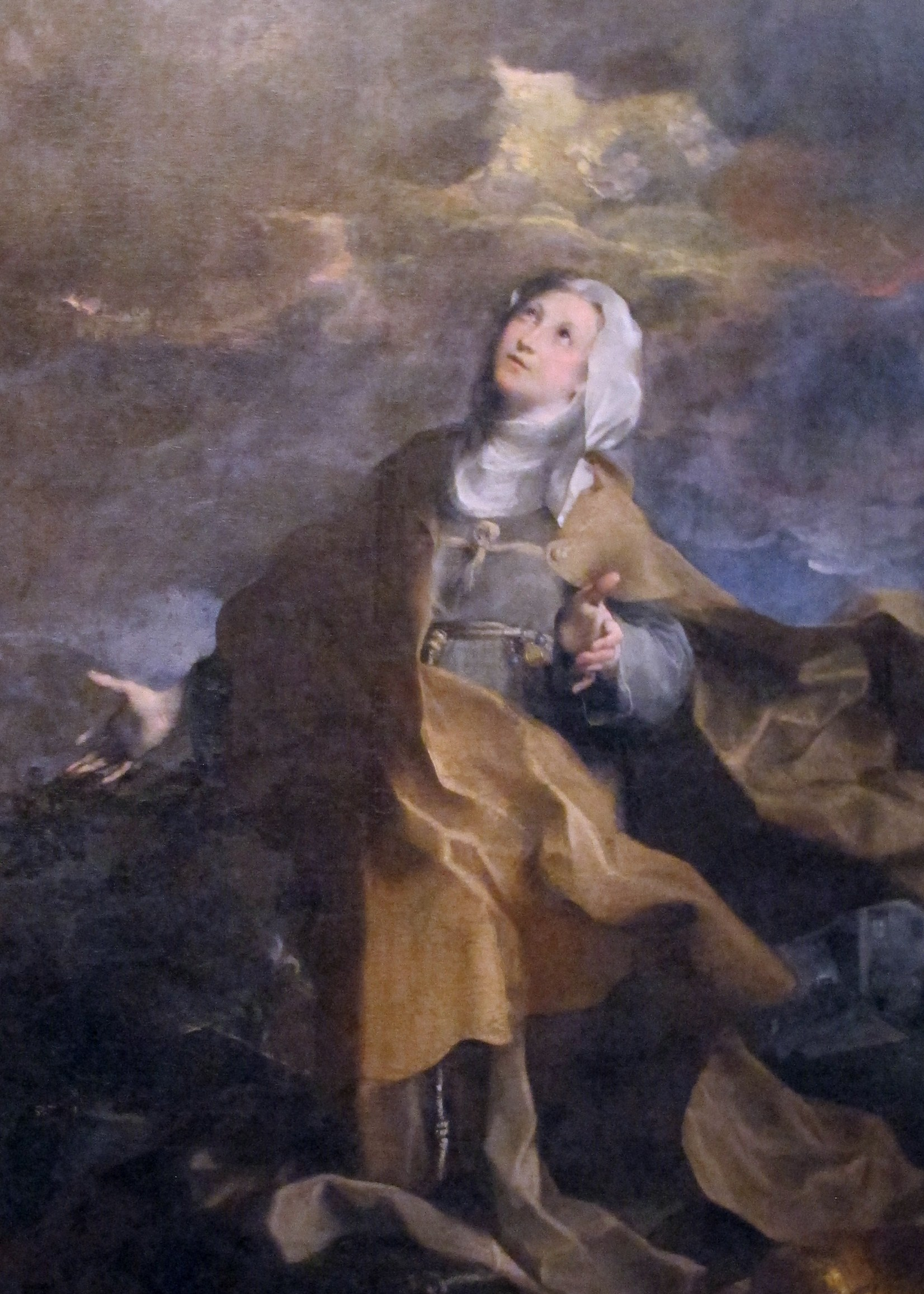
- Michelina of Pesaro by Federico Barocci
- Born: Michelina Metelli; 1300; Farneto, Papal States
- Died: 19 June 1356 (aged 55–56); Pesaro, Papal States
- Venerated in: Roman Catholic Church
- Beatified: 13 April 1737, Rome by Pope Clement XII
- Feast: 20 June

Michelina Metelli (1300 – 1356), known as Michelina of Pesaro, was an Italian Roman Catholic Franciscan tertiary who was later beatified.

== Biography ==
Michelina Metelli was born in Farneto, Papal States, to a wealthy Italian family. She married into the noble Malatesta family at the age of 12 and was widowed by age 20. She led a lifestyle of parties and luxury but, after the death of her only son, she experienced a vision of him in heaven, and decided to become a member of the Third Order of Saint Francis.

She proceeded to give away all her belongings and property, and founded, together with Francis Zanferdini, the Confraternity of the Annunciation to care for the poor, nurse the sick and bury the dead. Initially her family believed her to be insane and had her locked up. Upon her release from confinement, she made a pilgrimage to the Holy Land as penance for her sins. It is believed that she received the stigmata in the course of this journey. Michelina died at her home in Pesaro on 19 June 1356 of natural causes.

== Beatification ==
She was beatified on 13 April 1737 by Pope Clement XII.
