= Brynoth =

Medieval Swedish bishop

Saint Brynoth of Skara
- Born: Sweden
- Residence: Skara, Västergötland, Sweden
- Died: 6 February 1317
- Canonized: 1498
- Feast: 9 May

Saint Brynoth of Skara (died 6 February 1317) was a medieval Swedish bishop who was canonized in 1498. His feast day is 9 May.

== Life ==
The Book of Saints of the Monks of Ramsgate says only that he was "A Swede, Bishop of Scara in West Gothland, who passed away Feb 6, 1317, and is honoured in Sweden as a Saint." According to the hagiographer Alban Butler (1821),

ST. SIGFRID, apostle of Sweden, consecrated St. Unno, an Englishman, first bishop of Scara, in the province of West-Gothland, in Sweden. Brynoth, son of Algoth Fulcong, was from him the twenty-second bishop of this church, which he governed thirty-eight years with admirable zeal and sanctity, and dying on the 6th of February in 1317, was honoured in Sweden amongst the saints. See the catalogue of the bishops of Scara, in Swedish verses, divided into stanzas, written under their pictures in the palace of stone, built by Brynoth III. bishop of that see in the decline of the fifteenth century, preserved by Benzelius, junior, in Monum. Ecclesiæ Suevogothicæ, p. 78, et not. p. 231; see also on this saint, Messenius, in Chronologia Scondiæ, ad annos 1278, 1287, 1289, 1317, and Analectorum, t. 2, p. 131, 139, 141; and his Historia Sanctorum et Præsulum Scondiæ, aucta a Joan. Perinksgioldo, in Messenius’s Scondia Illustrata. Stockholmiæ, 1700, in ten tom. fol. See also John Vastovius, published by Benzelius, p. 78

== Sources ==
- Butler, Alban (1821), The lives of the fathers, martyrs, and other principal saints, vol. V: May This article incorporates text from this source, which is in the public domain.
- Monks of Ramsgate (1921), The Book of Saints, St Augustine's Abbey, Ramsgate: Aeterna Press, GGKEY:CR3H1S3CG76 This article incorporates text from this source, which is in the public domain.
- "Saint Brynoth of Scara", CatholicSaints.info
