= Skara =

Place in Västergötland, Sweden

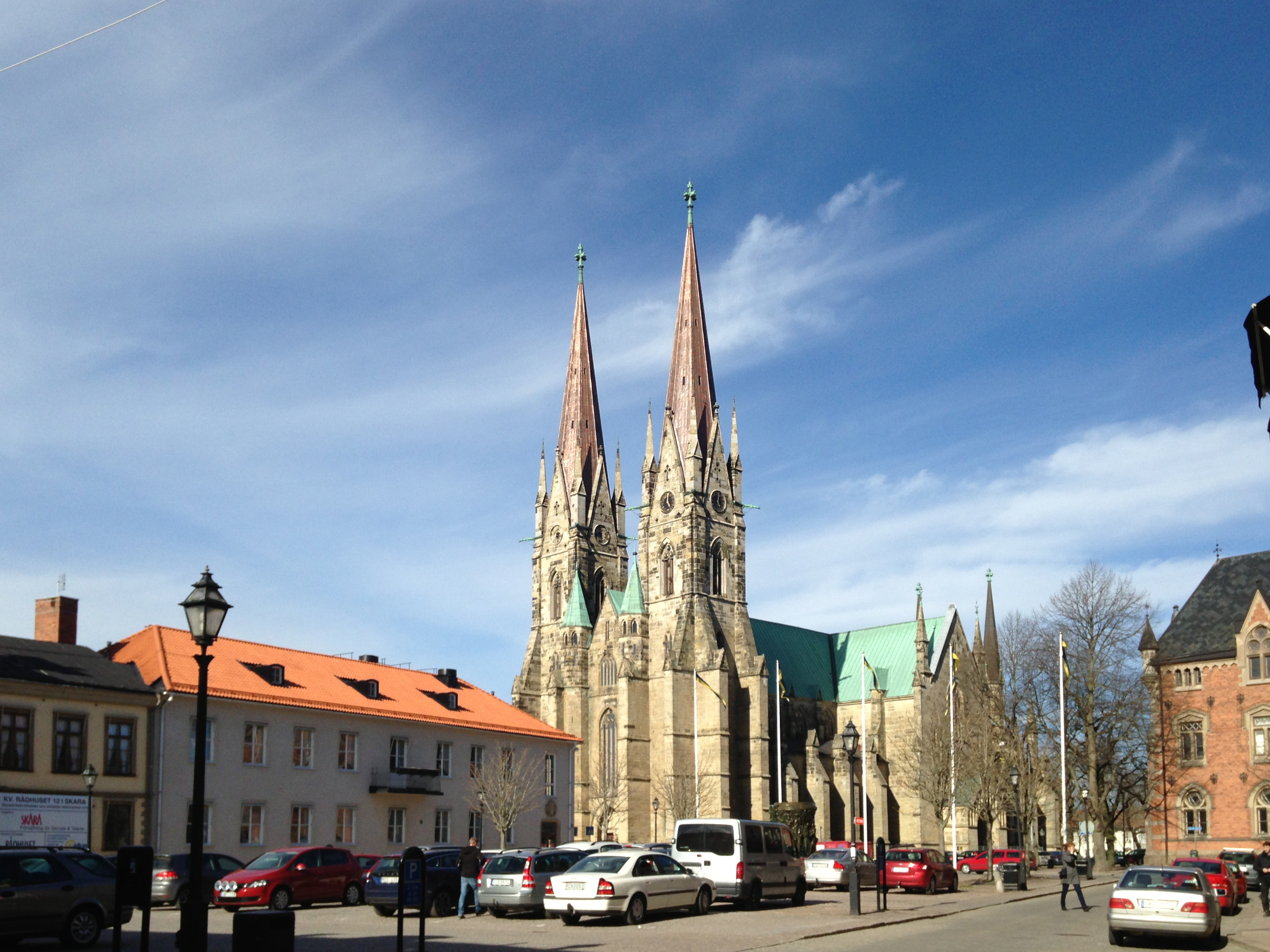
- Skara Cathedral

- Coat of arms

- Location within Västra Götaland Location within Sweden
- Coordinates: 58°23′N 13°26′E
- Country: Sweden
- Province: Västergötland
- County: Västra Götaland County
- Municipality: Skara Municipality
- Charter: 988

Area
  - Total: 8.4 km^{2} (3.2 sq mi)

Population (31 December 2024)
  - Total: 11 475
  - Density: 1,366/km^{2} (3,540/sq mi)
- Time zone: UTC+1 (CET)
  - Summer (DST): UTC+2 (CEST)
- Climate: Dfb

Skara is a locality and the seat of Skara Municipality, Västra Götaland County, Sweden with 11,475 inhabitants in 2023. Despite its small size, it is one of the oldest cities in Sweden, and has a long educational and ecclesiastical history. One of Sweden's oldest high schools, Katedralskolan (cathedral school), is situated in Skara. The former county of Skaraborg was named after a fortress near the town.

== Geography ==
Skara is located by the E20 motorway, about 130 km (81 mi) northeast of Gothenburg, in the centre of Västergötland. Across the hills to its east is the somewhat larger town of Skövde, about 25 kilometres (16 mi) away.

== Climate ==
Skara has a humid continental climate, though it is influenced by maritime moderation in spite of its inland position. Its proximity to Kattegat and lake Vänern contributes to summers being slightly cooler than areas to the north-east, and winter temperatures mostly hover around the freezing point.

Climate data for Skara (2002–2021 averages), extremes since 1901
Month	Jan	Feb	Mar	Apr	May	Jun	Jul	Aug	Sep	Oct	Nov	Dec	Year
Record high °C (°F)	9.9 (49.8)	13.2 (55.8)	19.1 (66.4)	27.6 (81.7)	29.0 (84.2)	33.8 (92.8)	34.0 (93.2)	34.5 (94.1)	26.2 (79.2)	21.1 (70.0)	16.1 (61.0)	11.5 (52.7)	34.5 (94.1)
Mean maximum °C (°F)	6.8 (44.2)	7.3 (45.1)	12.4 (54.3)	19.0 (66.2)	24.4 (75.9)	27.1 (80.8)	28.7 (83.7)	27.3 (81.1)	22.4 (72.3)	16.0 (60.8)	11.4 (52.5)	8.0 (46.4)	29.9 (85.8)
Mean daily maximum °C (°F)	0.9 (33.6)	1.3 (34.3)	5.2 (41.4)	11.6 (52.9)	16.6 (61.9)	20.4 (68.7)	22.4 (72.3)	21.0 (69.8)	16.7 (62.1)	10.3 (50.5)	5.7 (42.3)	2.5 (36.5)	11.2 (52.2)
Daily mean °C (°F)	−1.5 (29.3)	−1.4 (29.5)	1.5 (34.7)	6.5 (43.7)	11.3 (52.3)	15.0 (59.0)	17.3 (63.1)	16.2 (61.2)	12.5 (54.5)	7.1 (44.8)	3.4 (38.1)	0.3 (32.5)	7.4 (45.2)
Mean daily minimum °C (°F)	−3.9 (25.0)	−4.0 (24.8)	−2.2 (28.0)	1.3 (34.3)	5.9 (42.6)	9.6 (49.3)	12.1 (53.8)	11.4 (52.5)	8.2 (46.8)	3.9 (39.0)	1.1 (34.0)	−2.0 (28.4)	3.4 (38.2)
Mean minimum °C (°F)	−14.7 (5.5)	−13.4 (7.9)	−10.1 (13.8)	−5.0 (23.0)	−1.3 (29.7)	3.7 (38.7)	7.1 (44.8)	5.1 (41.2)	0.4 (32.7)	−3.9 (25.0)	−7.3 (18.9)	−11.2 (11.8)	−17.8 (0.0)
Record low °C (°F)	−32.0 (−25.6)	−33.7 (−28.7)	−29.3 (−20.7)	−22.8 (−9.0)	−7.8 (18.0)	−4.0 (24.8)	3.0 (37.4)	−2.8 (27.0)	−6.5 (20.3)	−15.0 (5.0)	−22.5 (−8.5)	−26.3 (−15.3)	−33.7 (−28.7)
Average precipitation mm (inches)	42.6 (1.68)	35.4 (1.39)	31.5 (1.24)	31.7 (1.25)	52.8 (2.08)	79.9 (3.15)	92.0 (3.62)	89.0 (3.50)	57.2 (2.25)	66.6 (2.62)	55.9 (2.20)	52.3 (2.06)	686.9 (27.04)
Source 1: SMHI Open Data - Precipitation for Skara
Source 2: SMHI Open Data - Temperature for Skara

== History ==
According to local legend, Skara was founded in AD 988, making it one of the oldest cities of Sweden. It was one of only two cities in what was to become Västergötland, the other being Lödöse. Skara was the location for the regional assembly, the Thing of all Geats.

With the Christianization of Sweden, around 1000 AD, Skara became the seat for the bishop and a religious centre for the ensuing centuries. There have been bishops of Skara in an unbroken succession to this day.

Many important assemblies were held in Skara in medieval times. Examples include the important Swedish chancellor meeting in 1326. A meeting of Swedish, Danish and Norwegians in 1458, decided upon the later Kalmar Union.

In the ensuing medieval centuries, monasteries and other churches were completed in the town. The first monastery was for the Dominican order, called the monastery of Saint Olaf, opened in 1234; the other was of the Franciscan order, known as Saint Catherine (or Katarina in Swedish), recorded in 1259.

The foundations of the Skara Cathedral are believed to stem from around 1050. The current cathedral was inaugurated in 1150, but findings during the last 50 years show it must be at least a century older. Its current appearance, however, stems from renovations in the 1880s by Helgo Zettervall, who also renovated the Cathedral of Uppsala.

=== Middle ages ===
Medieval artifacts have been found in or near the Skara cathedral. A chalice from bishop Adalvard the Elder, dead in 1064, was found in his grave in the 18th century. For a while the Adalvardskalken was used in the Holy Communion.

Some 44 pages of a book containing texts and hymns of 11th-century Catholic rituals, the Skara Missal, is held and exhibited in Skara.

Other ancient objects have been found during excavations of the monasteries and churches.

=== Education ===
There is a branch of the Swedish University of Agricultural Sciences (Sveriges Lantbruksuniversitet) in Skara.

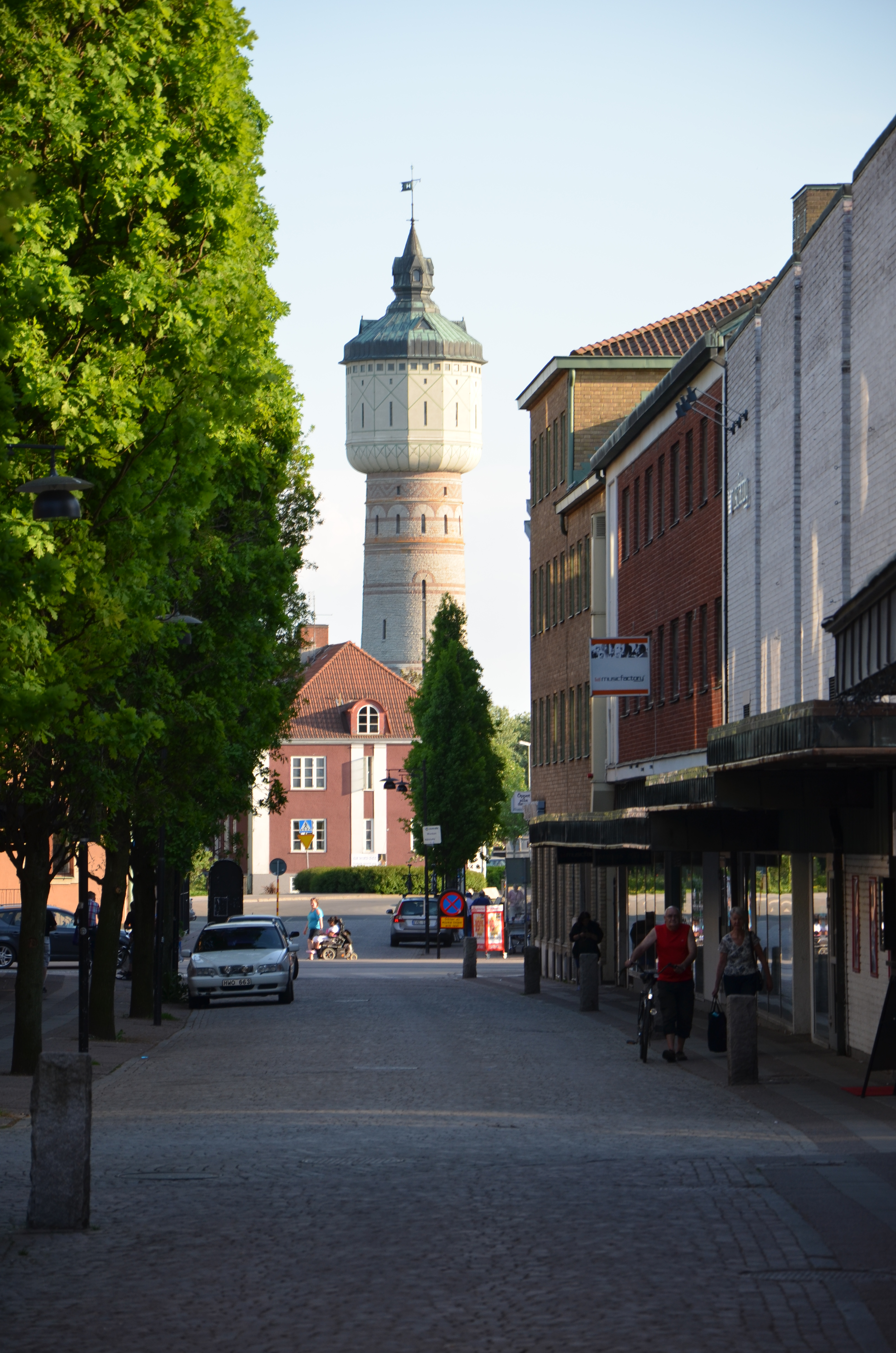
The water tower in Skara.

== Culture and attractions ==
In the city centre, near the main square, is the imposing Skara Cathedral. Within walking distance from the Cathedral is the Museum of Västergötland and its adjacent open-air museum Fornbyn, featuring several old cottages and other historical buildings from the local area.

In early spring, several thousand cranes gather in and around Lake Hornborga, on their yearly migration from the south of Europe to northern Scandinavia. This is a very popular tourist attraction during a few hectic weeks in March/April.

Within the municipality but outside of the city is Varnhem, home to a medieval Cistercian abbey and the remains of possibly the oldest Christian church in Sweden. Just outside the abbey are the ruins of the Cistercian monastery, built around 1150 A.D.

There are several music and entertainment artists in Skara. The Skara Sommarland is a popular amusement park. Most notable is its water park with water chutes, artificial rafts, etc.

The museum of Västergötland is situated in Skara. There is also a railway museum called Skara järnvägsmuseum.

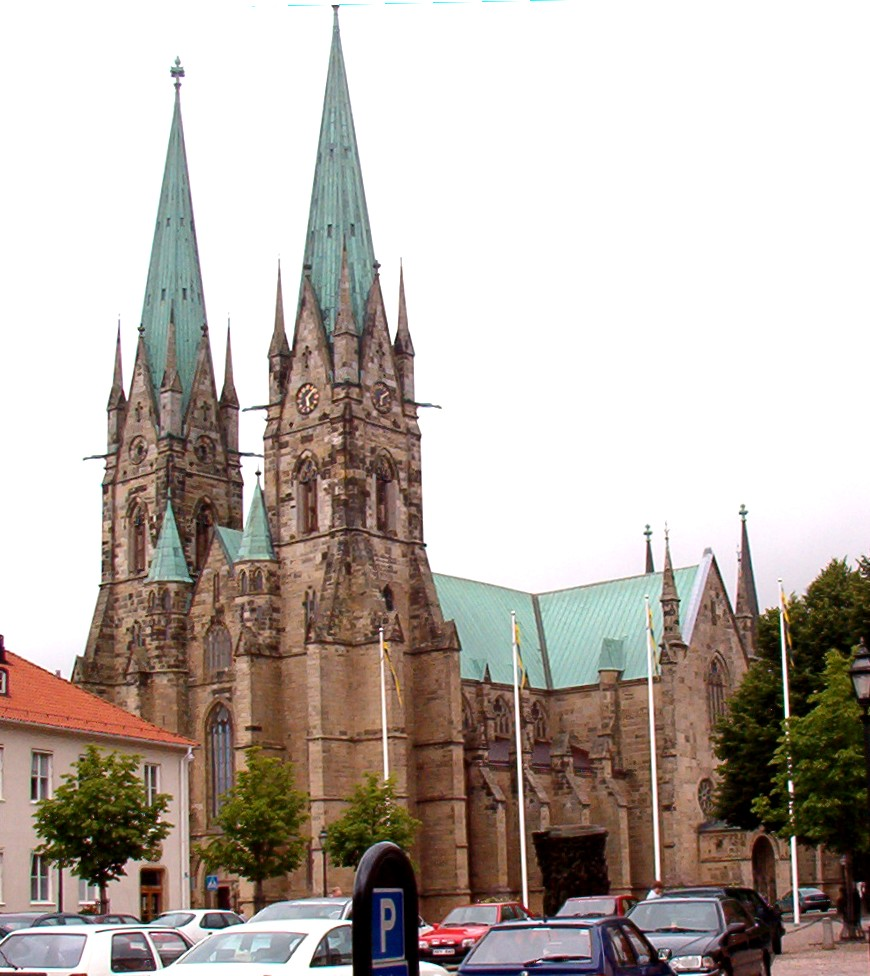
Skara Cathedral in central Skara, 2005

=== Sport ===
The handball team Skara HF won the Swedish Women's Championnship in 2025.

== Sister cities ==
Skara is twinned with:

- Radviliškis, Lithuania
- Eidsvoll, Norway
- Sorø, Denmark
- Fljótsdalshérað, Iceland
- Zeven, Germany

== See also ==
- Diocese of Skara
- Norra Härene Runestone
