= Skara Cathedral =

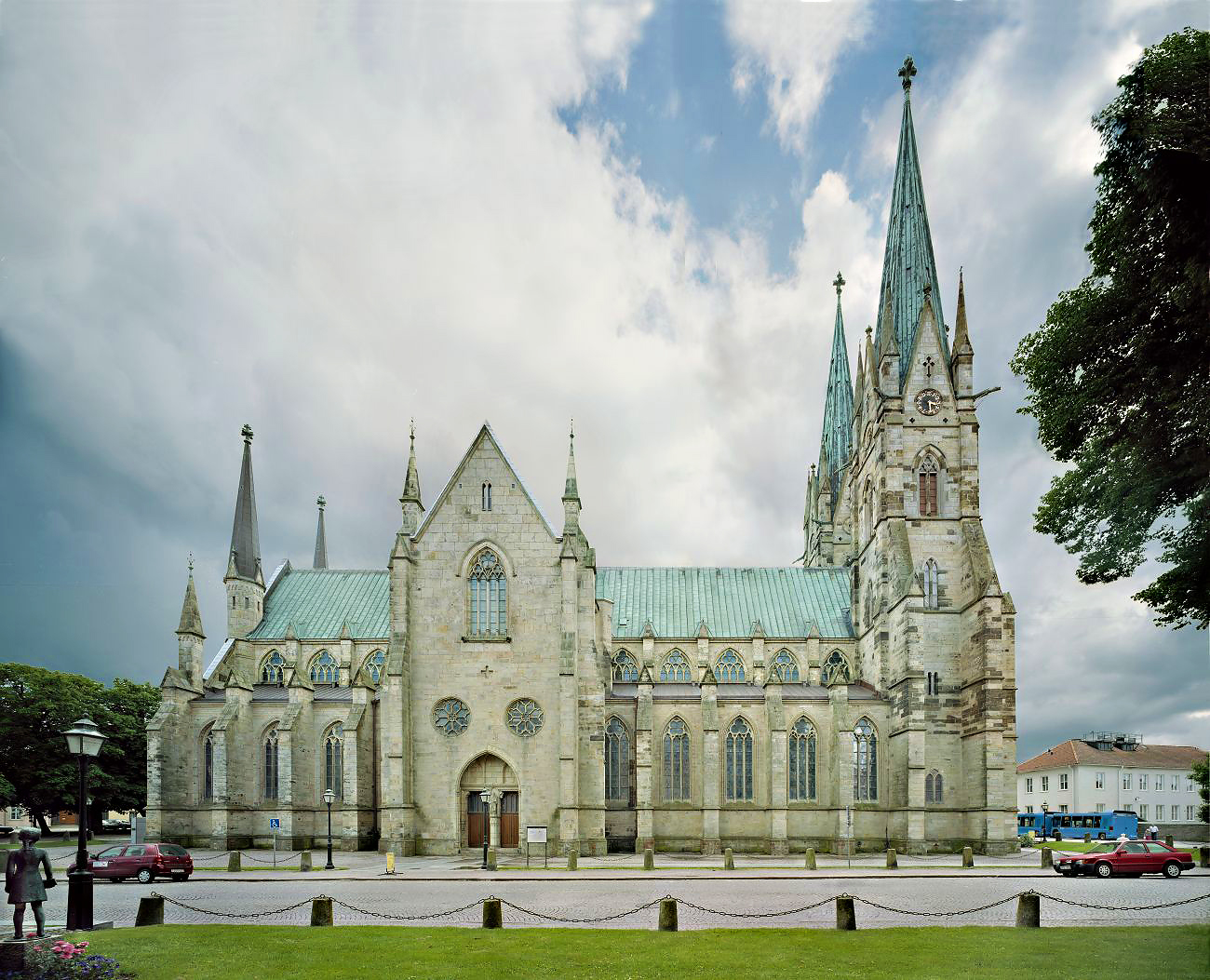
- Skara Cathedral, July 2004
- Skara Cathedral
- 58°23′11″N 13°26′21″E
- Location: Skara
- Country: Sweden
- Denomination: Church of Sweden
- Previous denomination: Roman Catholic

History
- Status: Cathedral
- Founded: 11th Century
- Dedication: St Mary

Architecture
- Functional status: Active
- Style: Gothic
- Groundbreaking: 13th Century

Administration
- Diocese: Skara

Clergy
- Bishop: Åke Bonnier

Skara Cathedral (Swedish: Skara domkyrka) is a church in the town of Skara, Sweden. The cathedral is the seat for the bishop of the Diocese of Skara of the Church of Sweden.

== History ==
Its history is traced from the 10th century (Note: According to Alban Butler, "ST. SIGFRID, apostle of Sweden, consecrated St. Unno, an Englishman, first bishop of Scara, in the province of West-Gothland, in Sweden. Brynoth, son of Algoth Fulcong, was from him the twenty-second bishop of this church, which he governed thirty-eight years with admirable zeal and sanctity, and dying on the 6th of February in 1317, was honoured in Sweden amongst the saints"), but its current appearance in the Gothic style originated in the 13th century. The choir dates back to the early 13th century, whilst the transept and nave took shape a century later. The cathedral was damaged and restored on several occasions, making its current appearance rather modern. In the 1760s, it was given a baroque southern facade. The current Gothic Revival design dates to restorations in 1886–1894 under architect Helgo Zettervall (1831–1907). The previously flat twin towers were given pointed Gothic spires.

The 37 mosaic stained glass windows were created by the artist Bo Beskow (1906–1989) in cooperation with glazier Gustav Ringström between 1945 and 1976. The motifs are mostly biblical, but the two Swedish saints Bridget of Sweden and Helena of Skövde are also depicted. No windows from the medieval church have been preserved.

There are four bells in the two towers on the west side. The northern tower contains the large bell, cast in 1725 and enlarged in 1785, while three smaller bells hang in the southern tower. The church is 65 metres (213 ft) long and the towers reach a height of 63 metres (207 ft).

The church has a medieval crypt that was found in 1949 after having been buried under stones since the 13th century. A grave, containing a skeleton, was found in the crypt, which is within the oldest (10th century) part of the cathedral. Some remains of the original 10th-century structure can still be seen in the crypt.

== Gallery ==
Nave

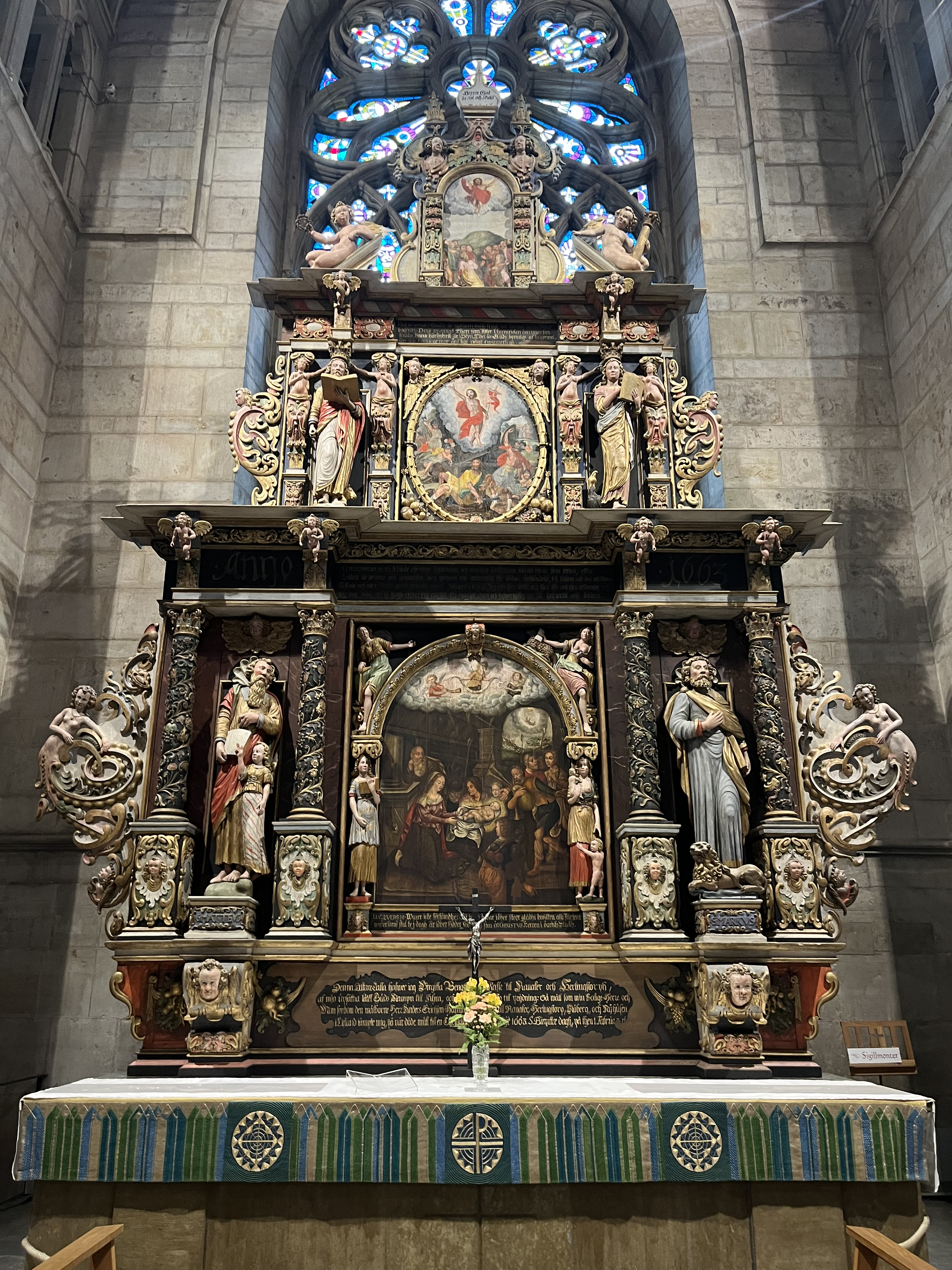
Altar

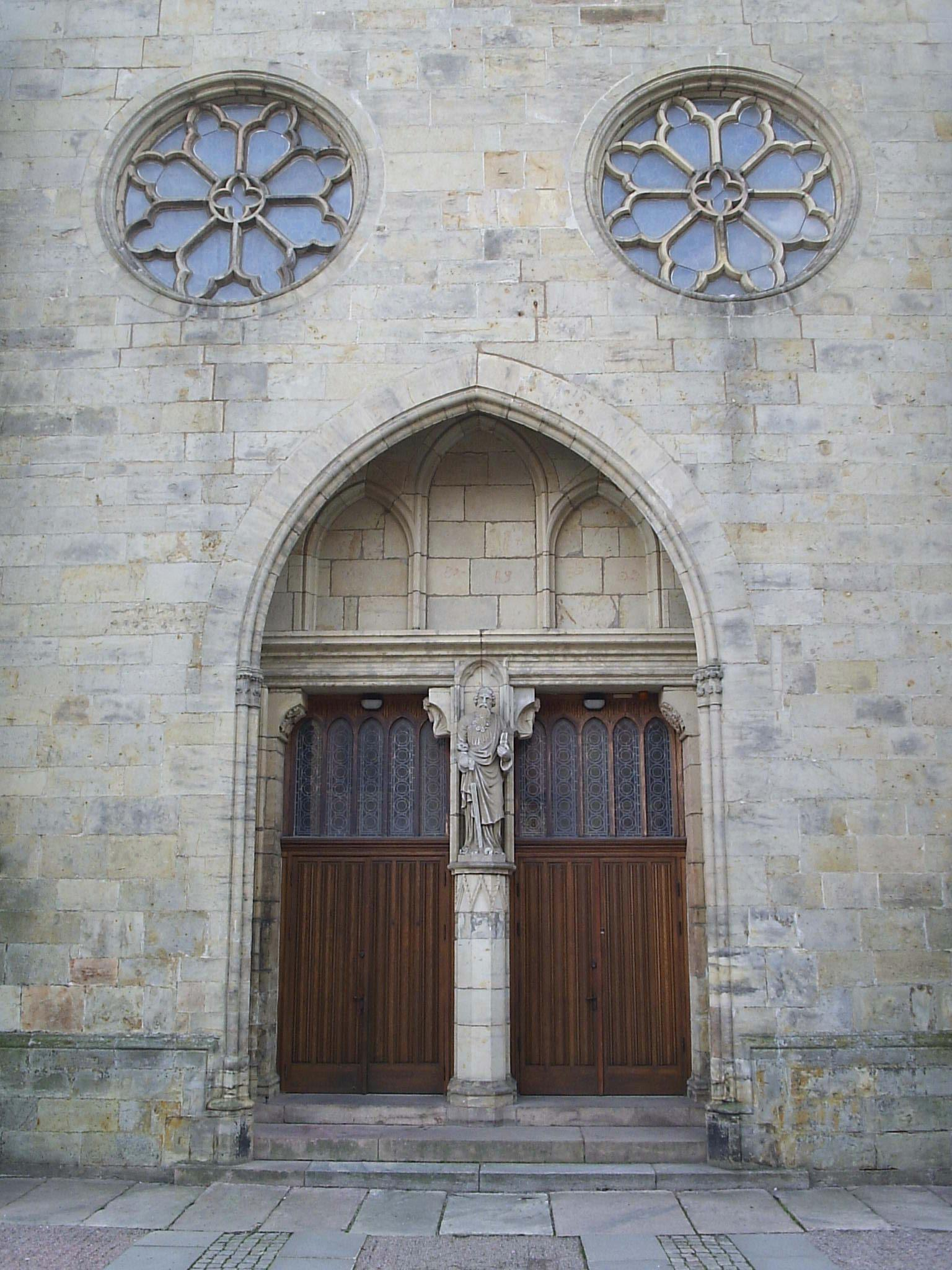
Entrance at the north transept

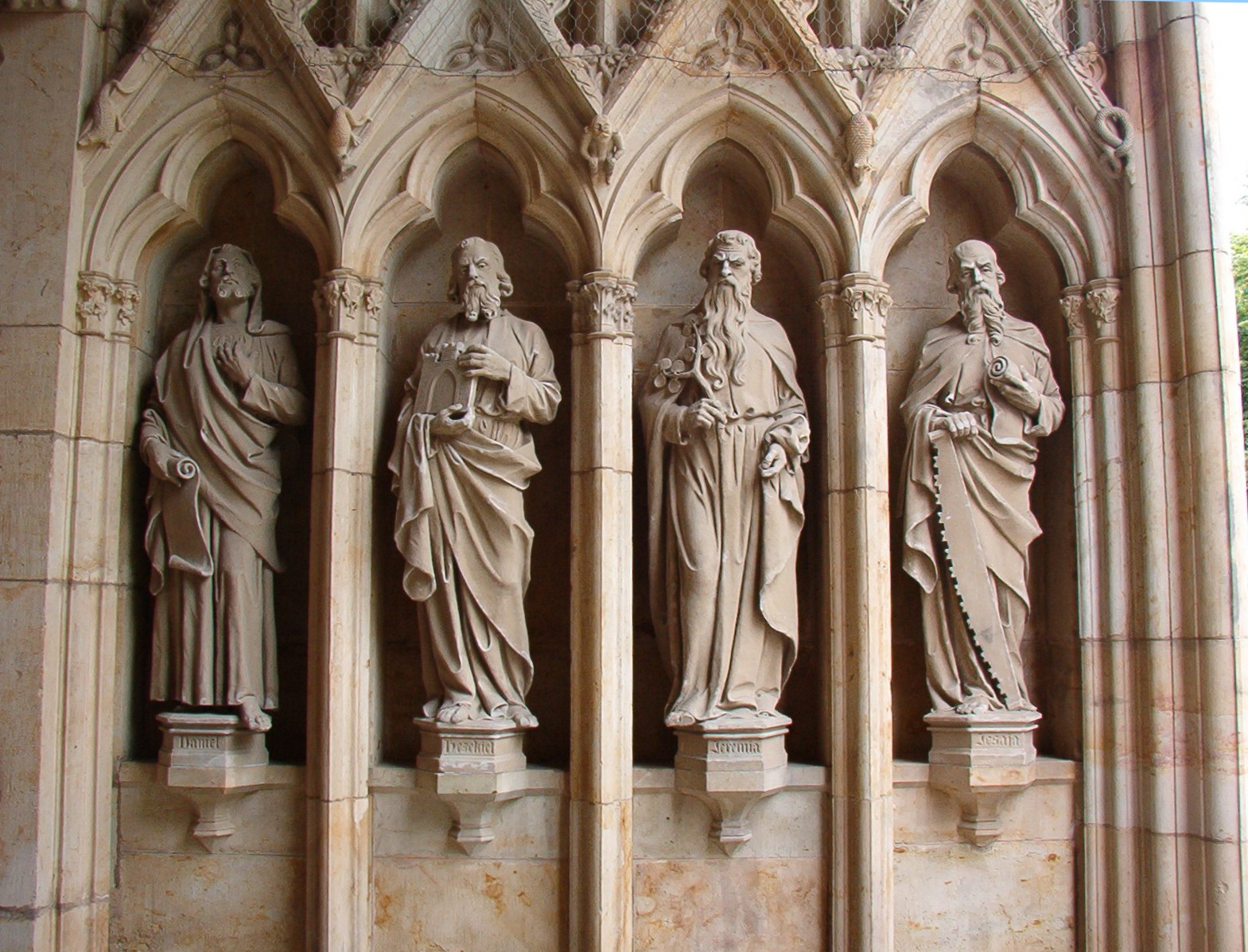
Statues of four prophets

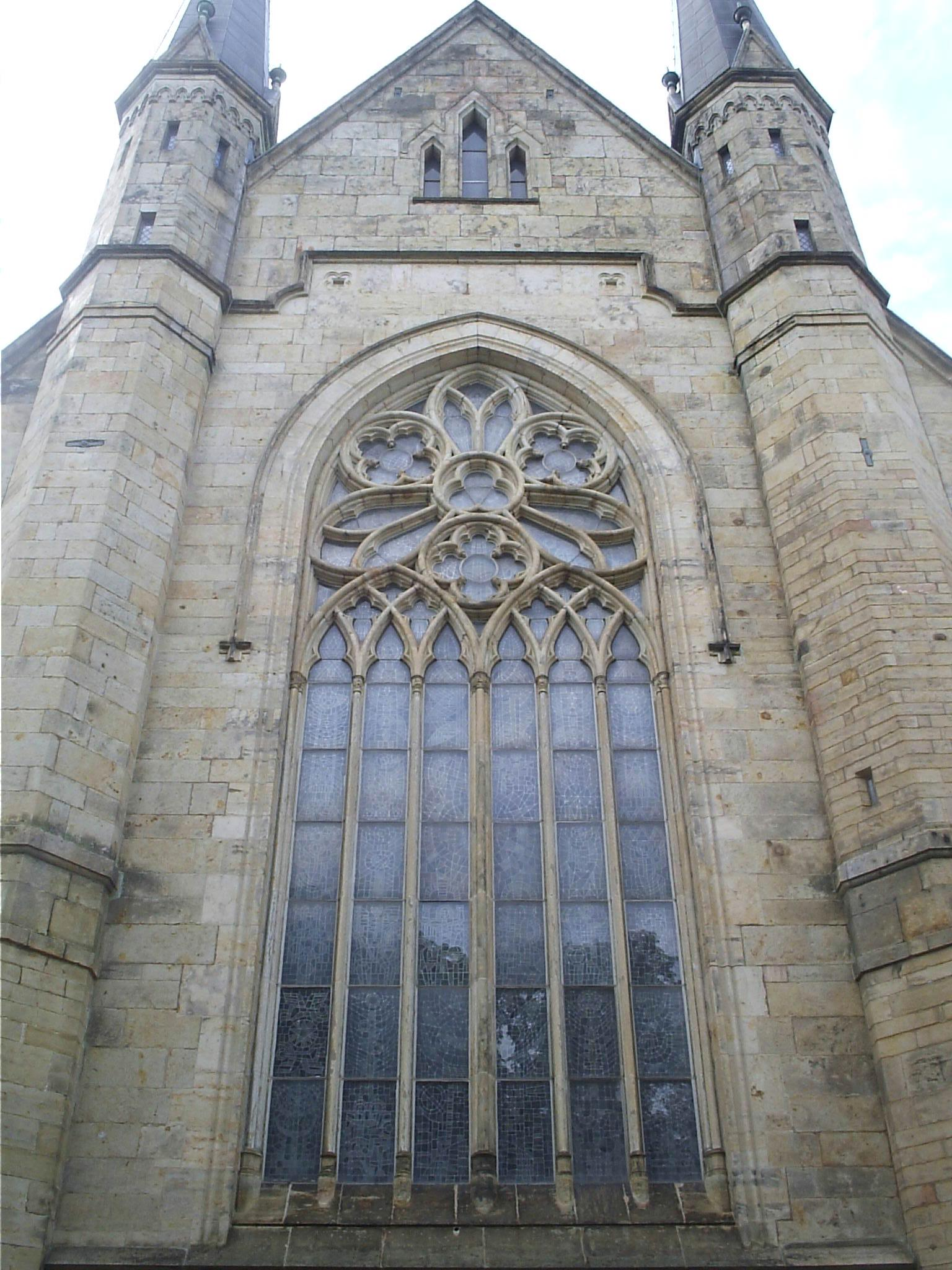
Chancel window

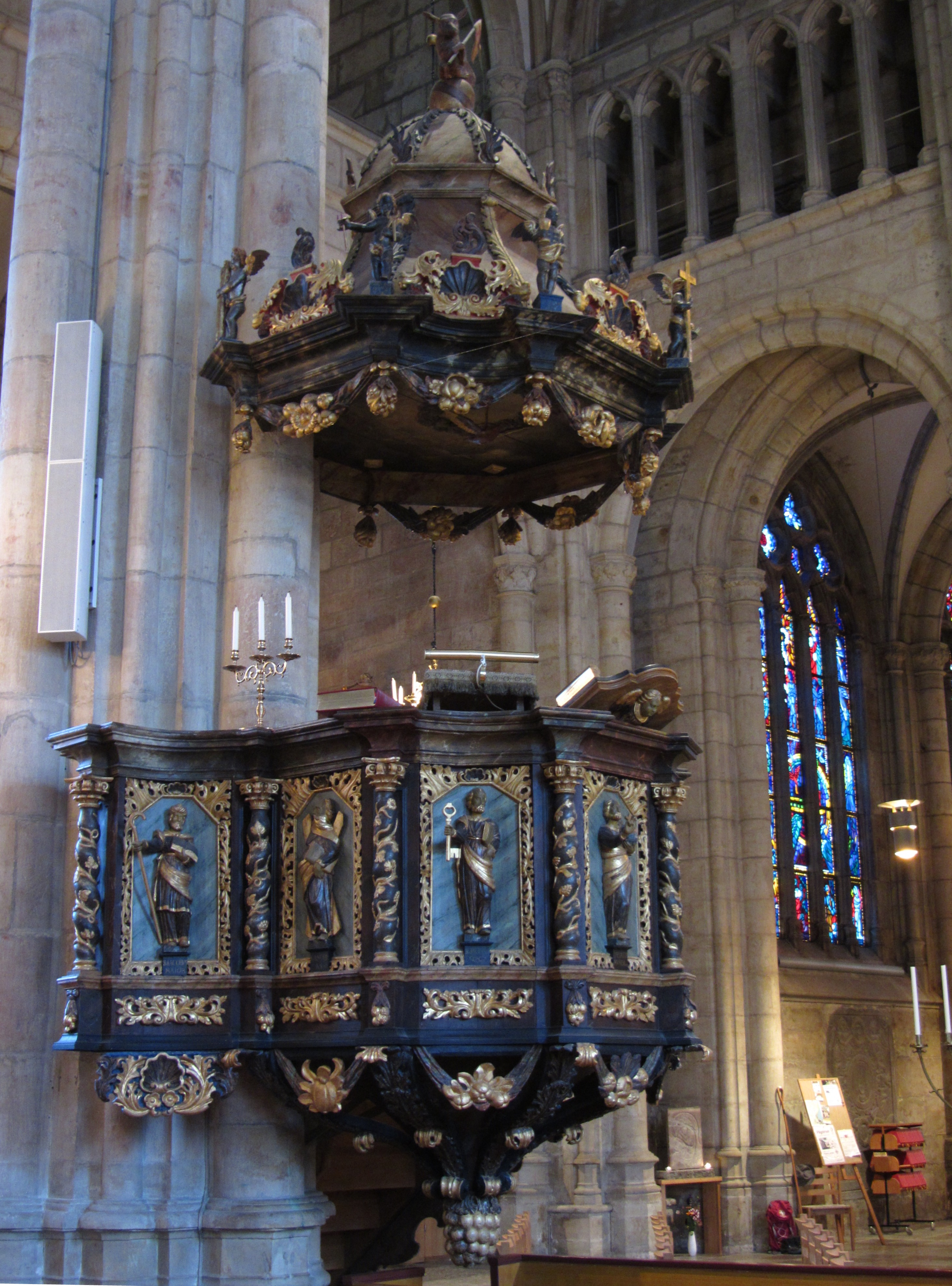
Pulpit

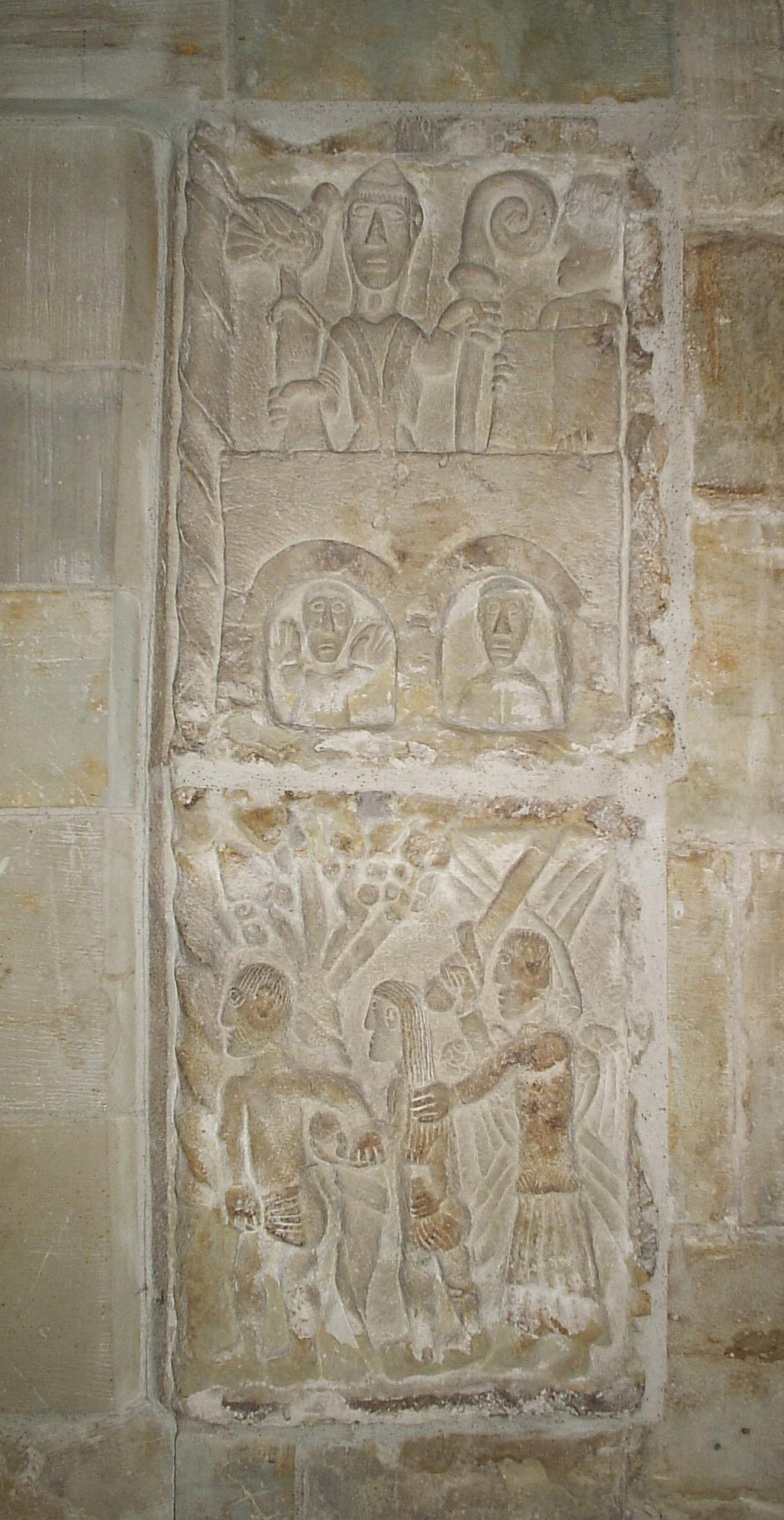
Stone reliefs (12th century)

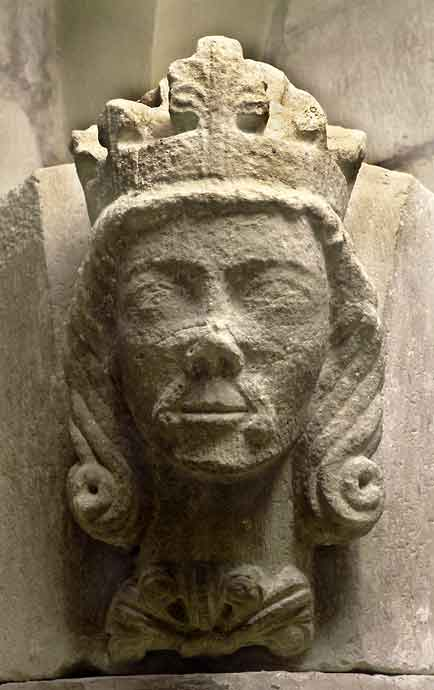
Portrait bust of King Valdemar

== Other Sources ==
- Wideen, Harald (1993) Skara Domkyrka, kort historik och vägledning (Stockholm: Kungl. Vetenskaps- och vitterhets-samhället) ISBN 91-85252-49-2
- Beskow, Bo (1985) Ny himmel, ny jord : en bok om Bo Beskows fönster i Skara domkyrka (Stockholm: Legenda) ISBN 91-582-0684-1
