= Diocese of Skara =

Lutheran diocese in Sweden

Diocese of Skara Diocesis Scarensis Skara stift
- Arms of the diocese of Skara

- Flag

Location
- Country: Sweden
- Deaneries: 11 kontrakt
- Coordinates: 58°23′11″N 13°26′21″E

Statistics
- Parishes: 51
- Congregations: 124

Information
- Denomination: Church of Sweden
- Established: 11th century
- Cathedral: Skara Cathedral

Current leadership
- Bishop: Ulrica Fritzson

Map

Website
- svenskakyrkan.se/skarastift

The Diocese of Skara (Swedish: Skara stift) is the oldest existing diocese in Sweden. It was originally a Latin bishopric of the Roman Catholic church, but since the Protestant Reformation has been a Lutheran diocese within the Church of Sweden, with its seat in Skara at Skara Cathedral. In 2014, it celebrated its 1000-year anniversary as a full diocese.

== History ==
=== Catholic organisation ===
The diocese was first founded around 990 CE in Skara, the capital of the country of the Geats in Götaland. It covered the entire era of medieval Götaland until about 1100, when the eastern portion of the diocese was split off and formed the Diocese of Linköping. It then consisted of the provinces of Västergötland and Värmland. When the Diocese of Skara was founded, it was initially suffragan to the Archdiocese of Hamburg-Bremen until 1104 when it was transferred to the Archdiocese of Lund. In 1164 it was finally made suffragan to the Archdiocese of Uppsala, under which it remained until the Catholic diocese's dissolution during the Protestant Reformation.

The diocese's cathedral chapter consisted latterly of a dean, an archdeacon, a subdean, and twenty-one canons. The town also had a Franciscan priory which was established around 1242 and a Dominican order priory from about 1260. At Lödöse there were also Franciscan order established in 1283 and a Dominican order established in 1286. The diocese also consisted of a Cistercian monastery at Varnhem and a Cistercian nunnery at Gudhem, founded around 1160. Besides Skara Cathedral and Varnhem Abbey, there are a large number of romanesque churches which were constructed during this period within the diocese.

In the village of Husaby there was a spring dedicated to St. Brigid of Kildare, an Irish saint. This Irish dedication may be accounted for by the fact that King Olof Skötkonung was baptized in Ireland in 1008 by Sigfrid, one of the first bishops of the diocese. St. Olaf was specially venerated in Dalby and Elgaa in Värmland.

=== Medieval history ===
When the diocese was founded in 990 there was no strict division of the country into dioceses, and missionary bishops traveled around the region preaching wherever they could. Because of this, although Odinkar Hvite the Elder functioned as the first bishop stationed at Skara about 990, Sigfrid was officially named as the first Bishop of Skara in a list of bishops in the Västgötalagen, dating to c. 1325. Sigfrid was an Englishman of Scandinavian origin, a court bishop of King Olaf I of Norway, and a monk of Glastonbury. According to the Västgötalagen, Sigfrid founded three churches in Västergötland and baptized Olof Skötkonung, the first Christian King of Sweden, at Husaby in 1008. In Skara, Odinkar was succeeded by Thurgot, the first diocesan Bishop of Skara who held the position from 1012 to 1030. He was nominally succeeded by Gotskalk, a monk of the Benedictine abbey at Lüneburg, who never left his abbey, although he had been consecrated as bishop of Skara by Archbishop Liavizo of Hamburg (1030–32). Sigfrid took over official domain as the bishop of Skara in about 1031, a position which he held until at least 1043.

Although Sigfrid had entered into communication with the Archbishopric of Bremen and sent his relative and successor Osmund to be educated there, both Sigfrid and Osmund seem to have been regarded as intruders by the Archbishop of Hamburg–Bremen. Osmund was consecrated in Poland, and refused to acknowledge the primacy of Hamburg. His refusal was supported by King Anund Jacob. Consequently, when Adalvard the Elder, the dean of Bremen who had been consecrated Bishop of Skara by Archbishop Adalbert on the death of Bishop Gotskalk, came to Skara around 1050 to take possession of his see, he was prevented from doing so. He had to wait for Osmund's departure for England around 1057 before he could overtake the position and install himself as the Bishop of Skara. Adalvard the Elder died in 1060 and was buried near the first Cathedral of St. Mary, which he had commissioned. Acelin, dean of Bremen, was consecrated bishop in 1061, but never took possession of the see. Adalvard the younger, who had visited and buried his elder namesake in 1060, was invited on his expulsion from the See of Sigtuna in 1067 to become Bishop of Skara, but was recalled to Bremen by Archbishop Adalbert.

Little is known of the next four bishops which succeeded Adalvard the younger: Rodulvard, Rikulf, Hervard, and finally Styrbjörn, who died c. 1130. They were eventually succeeded by Bishop Ödgrim or Oedgrim. Varnhem Abbey was founded in 1150 during his episcopate, and Oedgrim is known to have been present at the consecrations of Lund Cathedral in 1145 as well as Skara Cathedral. Oedgrim's successor, Bishop Benedict I (1158–90), expanded and furnished the cathedral. Benedict also oversaw the construction of Churches of St. Nicholas and of St. Peter in Skara, as well other infrastructure works such as roads and bridges.

Bishop Jerpulf was consecrated in 1191, and held the position until 1201. During his term, he persuaded a popular assembly at Askubeck to assign to the bishop part of the tithe. Bishop Benedict II (1217–30) founded several secular canonries in 1220, and thus establishing the diocese's cathedral chapter.

Brinolfo Algotsson is perhaps the most well known bishop of Skara, and the medieval bishop about whom the most records survive. He studied for eighteen years at the University of Paris before becoming the dean of Linköping. In 1278, he became Bishop of Skara. He issued statutes in 1231, and composed hymns and other works, amongst them a Life of St. Helena of Skövde. Bishop Brinolfo Algotsson died on 6 February 1317. After his death, he became venerated as a saint and in 1499 Alexander VI allowed for the translation of his relics, but Saint Brinolfo was never formally canonized. Both he and his successor, Bishop Benedict III Tunnesson (1317–21), oversaw the restoration of Skara Catheral which began in 1312 and was completed in 1320. Bishop Sven the Great (1435– c. 1448) added frescos to the restored cathedral.

=== Protestant Reformation ===
Bishop Bryniolph III Gerlaktsson (1478–1505) regulated the border between his diocese and that of the Archdiocese of Lund. His successor, Bishop Vincent Hennings, was beheaded by King Christian II at the Stockholm bloodbath on 8 November 1520, although he protested aloud on his way to the scaffold against the injustice of his condemnation. Vincent Hennings was succeeded by Magnus Haraldsson (1523), whose election was not confirmed by the pope in spite of King Gustavus I's request. Instead the pope installed Johannes Franciscus de Potentia, a Franciscan, as Bishop of Skara, but the king refused to receive him. Gustavus I is widely considered to have started the Protestant Reformation in Sweden. Bishop Magnus Haraldsson, though at first submissive towards Gustavus I, led his diocesans to Larv to take part in the Westrogothian rebellion in opposition to implementation of Protestantism. He was accordingly deposed by the king, who in 1530 appointed a Protestant, Svend Jacobsson, to take over the diocese.

After the Reformation, the former dioceses of the Catholic Church in Sweden were overtaken by the Church of Sweden. Värmland, part of the original diocese's jurisdiction, was separated from the Diocese of Skara and made part of the Diocese of Mariestad and then later transferred to the Diocese of Karlstad.

== List of bishops ==
=== Catholic bishops ===
- Thurgot, 1014–1030
- Gotskalk, 1030, not consecrated
- Sigfrid, 1030–1050
- Osmund, 1050s
- Adalvard the Elder, 1060–1064
- Acilinus, 1064, not consecrated
- Adalvard the Younger, 1066–1068
- Rodulvard, mentioned 1081
- Rikulf, late 11th century
- Hervard, late 11th century or early 1100s
- Styrbjörn, died c. 1130
- Ödgrim, c. 1130–1150
- Benedict I (Swedish: Bengt I den gode), c. 1150–1190
- Järpulf, c. 1190–1200
- Jon Hyrne, 1201–1205
- Bernhard, 1206–1216
- Benedict II (Swedish: Bengt II den yngre), mentioned 1219–1228
- Stenar, c. 1228–1238
- Lars I, 1240/41–1257
- Valdemar, 1258–1262
- Ragvald, 1262–1263
- Ulf, 1263–1267
- Erik I, 1267–1278
- Brinolfo Algotsson, 1267–1317
- Bengt III Johansson, 1317–1321
- Erik II, 1321–1322
- Peder Larsson, 1322–1336
- Gunnar Tynnesson, 1337–1340
- Sigge Jonsson, 1340–1352
- Sigfrid Rotgeri, 1352–1352
- Lars II, 1354–1356
- Nils, 1356–1386
- Rudolf of Mecklenburg-Stargard, 1387–1391
- Torsten, 1391–1404
- Brynolf Karlsson, 1404–1424
- Sven Grotte, 1424–1449
- Bengt IV Gustavsson, 1449–1460 (Note: Under Bengt's exile of 1452–1457 the diocese was governed by Peder Larsson (officialis sedis episcopalis).)
- Bero Magni de Ludosia, 1461/62–1465, not consecrated
- Hans Markvardsson, 1465–1478
- Brynolf III Gerlaksson, 1478–1505
- Vincens Henningsson, 1505–1520
- Didrik Slagheck, 1520–1521

=== Lutheran bishops ===
- Francesesco de Potenza, 1523, not consecrated
- Magnus Haraldsson, 1522–1529
- Sveno Jacobi, 1530–1540
- Erik Svensson Hjort, 1544–1545
- Erik Falck, 1547–1558
- Erik Pedersson Hwass, 1558–1560
- Erik Nicolai Swart, 1561–1570
- Jacob Johannis, 1570–1595 (Note: Disposed as liturgic in 1593 in favor of Henrik Gadolenus but remained in office until 1595.)
  - Henrik Gadolenus, 1593 (Note: Appointed at the Uppsala Synod in 1593, but not consecrated as Jacob Johannis remained in office.)
- Petrus Kenicius, 1595–1609
- Paulus Pauli, 1612–1616
- Sveno Svenonis, 1618–1639
- Jonas Magni Wexionensis, 1640–1651
- Olof Fristadius, 1651–1654
- Johannes Kempe, 1655–1673
- Johan Baazius the younger, 1673–1677
- Andreas Omenius, 1677–1684
- Haquin Spegel, 1685–1691
- Petrus Johannis Rudbeckius, 1692–1701
- Jesper Swedberg, 1702–1735
- Petrus Schyllberg, 1736–1743
- Daniel Juslenius, 1744–1752
- Engelbert Halenius, 1753–1767
- Anders Forssenius, 1767–1788
- Thure Weidman, 1789–1828
- Sven Lundblad, 1829–1837
- Johan Albert Butsch, 1837–1875
- Anders Fredrik Beckman, 1875–1894
- Ernst Jakob Keijser, 1895–1905
- Hjalmar Danell, 1905–1935
- Gustaf Ljunggren, 1935–1950
- Yngve Rudberg, 1951–1955
- Sven Danell, 1955–1969
- Helge Brattgård, 1969–1985
- Karl-Gunnar Grape, 1985–1989
- Lars-Göran Lönnermark, 1989–2004
- Erik Aurelius, 2004–2012
- Åke Bonnier, 2012–2024
- Ulrica Fritzson, 2024–present

== See also ==
- Ödenäs Church
