= Lödöse =

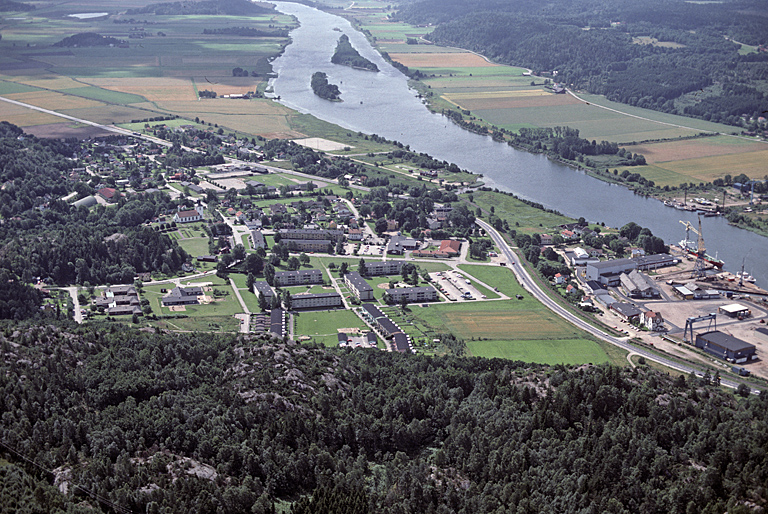
- July 1988 aerial view of Lödöse

- Location within Västra Götaland Location within Sweden
- Coordinates: 58°02′00″N 12°09′30″E
- Country: Sweden
- Province: Västergötland
- County: Västra Götaland County
- Municipality: Lilla Edet Municipality

Area
  - Total: 1.28 km^{2} (0.49 sq mi)

Population (31 December 2010)
  - Total: 1,266
  - Density: 991/km^{2} (2,570/sq mi)
- Time zone: UTC+1 (CET)
  - Summer (DST): UTC+2 (CEST)

Lödöse (Swedish pronunciation: [ˈlø̂ːˌdøːsɛ]), also known as Gamla Lödöse is a locality situated in Lilla Edet Municipality, Västra Götaland County, Sweden. It is situated 40 kilometers northeast of Gothenburg and is considered the precursor to modern-day Gothenburg.

== Gamla Lödöse ==
Lödöse was a politically crucial centre of trade in Sweden during the middle ages. By the year 1000, Lödöse was an important trading town, located between modern-day Oslo and Copenhagen and near the mouth of the Göta river. It was the Geats' only port on the west coast: hence, it had great strategic importance. Until 1473, Lödöse was Sweden's only port with an exit to the North Sea. Trapped as it was between Norway and Denmark, Lödöse was moved further down the river to Nya Lödöse, where the present day suburb Gamlestan in Gothenburg is today. In 1621, King Gustavus Adolphus of Sweden decided the location of present-day Gothenburg with direct access to the North Sea and Atlantic.

== Modern Lödöse ==
Today, Lödöse is a small town with 1,300 inhabitants in Lilla Edet Municipality, 40 kilometers northeast of Gothenburg up the Göta älv. The medieval history of the town is displayed at the Lödöse Museum which opened in 1996. Lödöse had 1,266 inhabitants in 2010.

== People ==
- Bero Magni de Ludosia, medieval scholar and book collector

== See also ==
- History of Gothenburg

== Other sources ==
- Järpe, Anna (1986) Nya Lödöse (Stockholm: Riksantikvarieämbetet och Statens historiska museer) ISBN 91-7192-606-2
