= Haralds saga Sigurðarsonar =

Old Icelandic king's saga

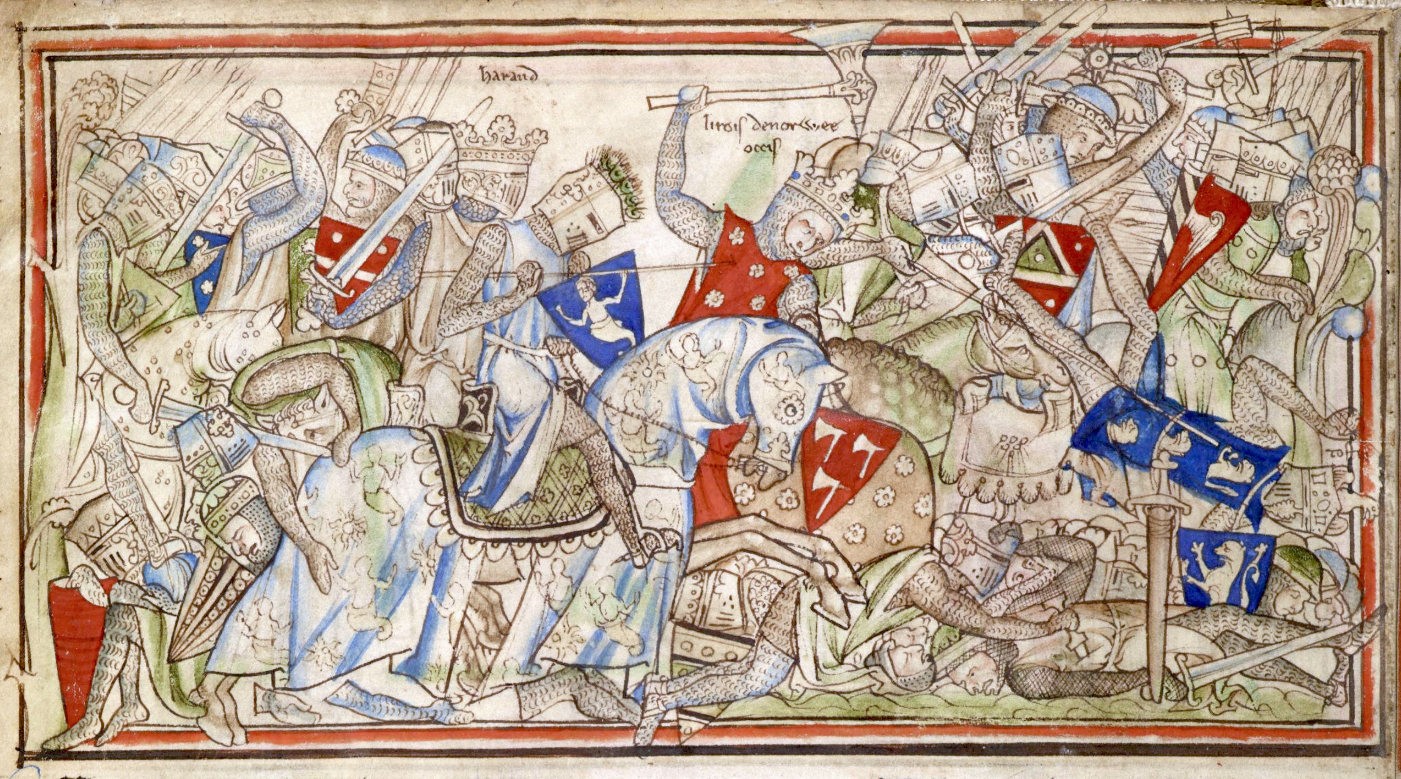
Haraldr Sigurðarson (wearing crown) fighting at the Battle of Stamford Bridge, as depicted by Matthew Paris in the Life of St Edward the Confessor in the mid-thirteenth century Cambridge University Library MS Ee.3.59, f. 32v, roughly coeval with the composition of Haralds saga.

Haralds saga Sigurðarsonar is an Old Icelandic king's saga focusing on the career of King Haraldr Sigurðarson of Norway (popularly referred to in English as Harald Hardrada).

The title Haralds saga Sigurðarsonar usually refers specifically to the account of Haraldr given in the collection of kings' sagas known as Heimskringla and attributed to Snorri Sturluson (1178/79–1241), though a substantially similar account is given in one of Snorri's main sources, the collection Morkinskinna, which seems to have given the title Saga Magnús góða ok Haralds harðráða to the equivalent section.

In the estimation of Alison Finlay and Anthony Faulkes, 'while Óláfs saga helga dominates Heimskringla as a whole, Haralds saga Sigurðarsonar achieves this status over the sagas of its final third, by virtue both of its length and of the compelling character of Haraldr himself'.

== Summary ==
Although the saga contains no Common Era dates, its chronology is fairly precise, allowing putative CE dates to be assigned to the events, as here.

Although in chapter 99 of Haralds saga, Heimskringla says that there are no tales of Haraldr before he was 15, Haraldr Sigurðarson is first mentioned in Heimskringla during Óláfs saga helga: in chapter 76, the infant Haraldr shows his fearlessness to King Óláfr, pulling at his moustache; plays with floating pieces of wood, pretending they are his warfleet; and expresses his domineering enthusiasm for having many warriors. In chapter 209, the fifteen-year-old Haraldr insists on fighting at the Battle of Stiklarstaðir.

Haralds saga itself begins in medias res with Haraldr's escape from the Battle of Stiklarstaðir (ch. 1; 1030). Haraldr proceeds to the court of King Jaroslav I of Kiev (ch. 2; 1031) before entering the military service of Empress Zoë Porphyrogenita of Byzantium (chs 3-15; c. 1035-44). The saga describes his military exploits in Sicily (chs 6-11; c. 1038-41) and North Africa, his conquest of Palestine and pilgrimage to Jerusalem, and escape from the unwanted advances of the Empress. Meanwhile, his nephew, Magnús Óláfsson góði becomes king of Norway (ch 13; 1035).

Having left Byzantium, Haraldr sails through the Black Sea to Novgorod (ch. 16), married Jaroslav's daughter Ellisif (ch. 17), gathers forces in Sweden (ch. 18; 1045), and, in alliance with Sveinn Úlfsson, invades Denmark and Norway (chs 19-20; 1046). Haraldr and Magnús make peace and share Norway, albeit tensely, until Magnús's death from sickness (chs 21-30; 1046-47), after which Haraldr is Norway's sole king. Meanwhile, Sveinn establishes himself as king of Denmark (chs 26, 31; 1047).

Haraldr and Sveinn vie for the rule of Denmark until finally making peace (ch 71; 1064). During this period, Haraldr takes a second wife, Þóra Þorbergsdóttir, with whom he has the sons Magnús and Óláfr (ch 33; 1048). After the peace treaty with Denmark, Haraldr campaigns in Upland (chs 72-74; 1065).

Chapters 75-77 describe the development of the succession crisis in England following the death of Edward the Confessor and the accession of Harold Godwinson (1064-66). Harold's brother Tostig Godwinson seeks the support of the Danish king Sveinn in invading England (ch. 78), and then Haraldr (ch. 79). Haraldr agrees, campaigns in Yorkshire, but dies at the Battle of Stamford Bridge (chs 80-94; 1066). William the Bastard invades and conquers England (chs 95-97; 1066).

Haraldr's son Magnús becomes king of Norway, coming to share the kingdom with his brother Óláfr until his death (chs 98-101; 1066-69). The closing chapters include a eulogy and evaluation of Haraldr (chs 99-100).

The saga includes 92 stanzas of skaldic verse, some attributed to Haraldr himself.

== Sources ==
The main source for Haralds saga is the relevant sections of the earlier Icelandic kings' saga Morkinskinna, but because that does not survive in an early form, it is hard to be certain how far the differences between Morkinskinna and Haralds saga are due to Snorri's revisions and how far they are due to later changes to Morkinskinna. In particular, Morkinskinna contains many more þættir giving anecdotes about Haraldr, among them the famous Auðunar þáttr vestfirzka. Twentieth-century research assumed that these had generally been added later in the transmission of Morkinskinna, but twenty-first-century research suggests rather that they may have been original, and that Snorri tended to remove such material. Chapters 39–72, however, are more similar to Hákonar saga Ívarssonar, and most research suggests that Haralds saga is based on that for this section, but the reverse has also been suggested: that Hákonar saga drew on Haralds saga. Snorri drew additionally on his knowledge of orally transmitted skaldic verse (including the poems "Sexstefja", "Stúfsdrápa", and Harald’s own "Gamanvísur") and anecdotes.

== Historical reliability ==
The outlines of Haralds saga are independently verified by (near-)contemporary accounts, principally the Byzantine Strategikon of Kekaumenos, Adam of Bremen's Gesta Hammaburgensis ecclesiae pontificum, and various accounts of the Norman Conquest of England, principally the Anglo-Saxon Chronicle.

Snorri seems to have attempted to portray Norwegian royalty in a more positive light than his written sources.

The account of Haraldr's attempts to conquer England and his defeat at the Battle of Stamford Bridge is judged less accurate than the Anglo-Saxon records. It has been suggested that Snorri included in that battle things that actually happened between Saxons and Norman at the Battle of Hastings.

== Editions and translations ==
Haralds saga has frequently been edited and translated in general editions and translations of Morkinskinna, Fagrskinna, and Heimskringla: see the relevant articles for details.

Alone or as part of a selection, the saga has appeared thus:

- The Sagas of Olaf Tryggvason and of Harald the Tyrant (Harald Haardraade), trans. by Ethel H. Hearn from the Norwegian translation by Gustav Storm, with pictures by H. Egedius, C. Krohg and E. Werenskiold (London: Williams & Norgate, 1911)
- Snorri Sturluson, Haralds saga harðráða and Magnúss saga berfætts, ed. by Sir William A. Craigie (Reykjavík: Menntamálaráð & Þjóðvinafélag, 1950)
- King Harald's Saga: Harald Hardradi of Norway, from Snorri Sturluson's 'Heimskringla', trans. by Magnus Magnusson and Hermann Pálsson (Harmondsworth: Penguin, 1966)
- Snorri Sturluson, Haralds saga harðráða (Akureyri: Menntaskólinn á Akureyri, 1975).
- Snorri Sturluson, La saga de Harald l'impitoyable: Haralds saga Sigurdarsonar tirée du Heimskringla, trans. by Régis Boyer, Petite bibliothèque Payot, 363 (Paris: Payot, 1979), ISBN 2228336300.
- Snorri Sturluson, Haralds saga harðráða: úr Heimskringlu, read by Ingólfur B. Kristjánsson (Reykjavík: Hlusta.is, 2010) [audiobook].

The poetry in it has recently been edited and translated by Kari Ellen Gade in Poetry from the Kings' Sagas, 2, ed. by Kari Ellen Gade, Skaldic Poetry of the Scandinavian Middle Ages, 2 (Turnhout: Brepols, 2009).

== Appearances in other works ==
Haralds saga is the basis for the short 1979 opera King Harald's Saga by Judith Weir.
