= Maria Haraldsdotter =

Norwegian princess (died 1066)

Maria Haraldsdotter (died 25 September 1066) was a Norwegian princess, as the daughter of Harald Hardrada and Elisiv of Kiev. She is the first known Norwegian to have been named Maria.

According to Heimskringla, Maria, together with her sister Ingegerd and mother, went with Harald on his expedition to Britain in 1066. Maria, Ingegerd and Elisiv were however left behind at Orkney, where Harald gathered reinforcements. By the Battle of Stamford Bridge, in which Harald was killed, Harald had promised Maria away for marriage to Eystein Orre (brother of Harald's concubine or second wife Tora Torbergsdatter), who also died at Stamford Bridge. When Harald's son Olaf and the rest of his fleet arrived back in Orkney, they learned that Maria had suddenly died on the same day that her father had died in battle.

== Bibliography ==
- Sturluson, Snorri (1994). Hødnebø, Finn; Magerøy, Hallvard (eds.). Heimskringla. Gyldendal. ISBN 8205221847.
