= Elisiv of Kiev =

Queen of Norway from 1045 to 1066

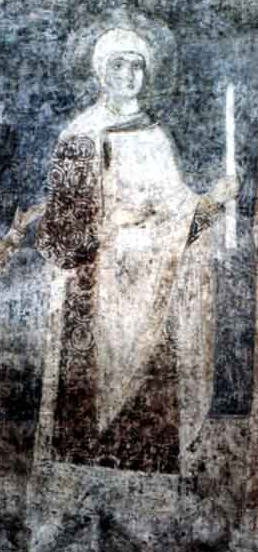

Queen consort of Norway
- Tenure: 1045–1066
- Born: c. 1025
- Died: c. 1067 (aged 41–42)
- Spouse: Harald III of Norway
- Issue: Maria Haraldsdotter; Ingegerd, Queen of Denmark and Sweden
Names
- Elisaveta Yaroslavna
- Dynasty: Rurik
- Father: Yaroslav I of Kiev
- Mother: Ingegerd Olofsdotter

Elisiv of Kiev (Note: Old Norse: Ellisif [ˈelːisiv]; Norwegian: Ellisif or Elisiv; Russian: Елизавета Ярославна; Ukrainian: Єлизавета Ярославна.) (c. 1025 – c. 1067) was a princess of Kiev and the queen consort of Harald III of Norway.

== Biography ==
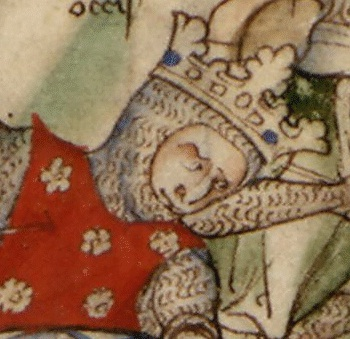
Depiction of Elisaveta's husband Harald, 13th century

Elisaveta was the daughter of the grand prince of Kiev, Yaroslav the Wise, and his consort Ingegerd Olofsdotter of Sweden, the daughter of Olof Skötkonung and Estrid of the Obotrites. Elisaveta was the sister of Anastasia who married the future Andrew I of Hungary, Anne who married Henry I of France, and possibly Agatha, wife of Edward the Exile. Her brothers included Vladimir, Iziaslav, Sviatoslav, Vsevolod and Igor.

During the winter of 1043–44, Elisaveta was married to Prince Harald Sigurdsson of Norway. Harald had left Norway in 1030 after having participated in the Battle of Stiklestad on the side of his half-brother, King Olav II of Norway. Harald had since then served under the protection of her father as well as that of the Byzantine monarch.

Elisaveta was the addressee of Harald's surviving poems where he lamented her suggested lack of affection towards him (no implications about their actual affections can be derived, as this might well be a poetic cliche). In 1045, she followed Harald to Norway, where he became co-king with his nephew, King Magnus the Good. In Norway, Elisaveta was known as Queen Elisiv. The marriage is best documented by the court poet Stuv den blinde (Stúfr blindi Þórðarson kattar). There is no other existing documentation about her stay in Norway.

In 1047, King Harald became the sole ruler of Norway after the death of King Magnus. In 1048, Harald took another wife, Tora Torbergsdatter with whom he had two sons, Magnus and Olaf. The marriage can largely be explained by politics and alliance building. The chiefs of the Giske family (Giskeætten) played a key role in power politics. It is possible, that Elisiv stayed in Kievan Rus', or that she died on her way to Norway. However, that would mean that the daughters of Harald, Ingegerd and Maria, who are attributed to her, must have been Tora's, which is not considered likely, as Maria was engaged to Øystein Orre fra Giske, who would have been her uncle had she been the daughter of Tora. It is therefore possible, that Tora was Harald's concubine. Tora became the mother of both King Olav Kyrre and King Magnus II Haraldsson.

In 1066, Harald invaded England, where he was killed in the Battle of Stamford Bridge. Tradition says that Elisiv and her daughters followed Harald to England, where Maria died, as it was said, at the news of her father's death. Afterward Elisiv and her second daughter, Ingegerd, returned to Norway with the Norwegian fleet. Elisiv was to have stayed at the Orkney Islands during this trip. However, the oldest of the sagas claim that it was Tora Torbergsdatter and not Elisiv who accompanied Harald on the trip, which is considered more likely, as Tora was the cousin of Thorfinn Sigurdsson, Earl of Orkney.

According to Adam of Bremen, the mother of King Olav Kyrre remarried either King Sweyn II of Denmark or an unnamed Swedish king as a widow, but this is unconfirmed. It is also unknown whether this refers to the actual mother of Olav Kyrre, which would mean Tora Torbergsdatter, or his stepmother, which would mean Elisiv. The date and place of the death of Queen Elisiv is unknown.

== Children ==
Elisiv and Harald had two daughters:

- Ingegerd (c. 1045 – 1120); married first to Olaf Hunger the future king of Denmark, and after his death, to Philip, the future king of Sweden.
- Maria (died 25 September 1066); promised in marriage to Eystein Orre (brother of Tora Torbergsdatter), but reportedly died on Orkney the same day that Harald and Eystein died.

== Bibliography ==
- Lindqvist, Herman (2006) Historien om alla Sveriges drottningar : från myt och helgon till drottning i tiden (Norstedts förlag) ISBN 978-9113015248
- Magnusson, Magnus; Pálsson, Hermann (1976) King Harald's Saga: Harald Hardradi of Norway: From Snorri Sturluson's Heimskringla (Penguin Classics) ISBN 978-0140441833
- Martin, Janet (1995) Medieval Russia, 980-1584 (Cambridge: Cambridge University Press) ISBN 0-521-36276-8
- Thuesen, Nils Petter (1991) Norges dronninger gjennom tusen år (Oslo: Tiden Norsk Forlag) ISBN 82-10034-58-8

Eliza Yaroslavna Rurik Born: 1025 Died: c. 1067
Norwegian royalty
Preceded by Emma of Normandy (Queen consort)	Royal Consort of Norway (Queen consort); 1045–1066	Succeeded by Ingerid of Denmark (Queen consort)
