= Tora Torbergsdatter =

Norwegian royal consort (born 1025)

- Born: 1025; Giske
- Died: Unknown
- Noble family: Giskeætten
- Spouses: Harald Hardrada; Sweyn II of Denmark(?)
- Issue: Olav Kyrre; Magnus II Haraldsson
- Father: Torberg Arnesson
- Mother: Ragnhild Erlingsdatter

Tora Torbergsdatter (Old Norse: Þóra Þorbergsdóttir, born 1025 – year of death unknown: fl. 1066) was a Norwegian royal consort. She was the mother of two kings of Norway. It is possible, but unconfirmed, that she was also queen of Denmark or Sweden.

== Biography ==
Tora Torbergsdatter was born on Giske in what is now Møre og Romsdal county in Norway. She belonged to the Giskeætten, a powerful family from Giske in Sunnmøre. She was daughter of Torberg Arnesson of Giske (c. 1000–1050) and wife Ragnhild Erlingsdatter (992), maternal granddaughter of Erling Skjalgsson and wife Astrid Eiriksdatter and paternal niece of Finn Arnesson and Kalv Arnesson.

King Harald had previously married Elisaveta Yaroslavna during the winter of 1043–44. The prior marriage between Harald and Elisaveta is only documented by the court poet Stuv den Blinde (Stúfr inn Blindi Þórðarson Kattar). There are no other remaining documentation about her stay in Norway. It is therefore possible that Elisaveta stayed in Kievan Rus', or that she may have died on her way to Norway. However, that would mean that the daughters of Harald, Ingegerd and Maria, who are attributed to her, must have been Tora's. This is not considered likely, as Maria was engaged to Eystein Orre, who would have been her uncle had she been the daughter of Tora. While later historians sometimes describe Tora Torbergsdatter as a concubine, contemporary sagas and historical traditions portray her as a respected royal consort and the mother of several Norwegian kings. Her position within the royal court and the political importance of her children suggest she held a status more comparable to that of a queen consort than the modern implication of “concubine” may suggest.

In 1066, Harald invaded England, where he died. Tradition says that Elisaveta and her daughters followed Harald to England, where Maria died, as it was said, at the news of her father's death. Afterward, Elisaveta and her second daughter Ingegerd returned to Norway with the Norwegian fleet. Elisaveta was to have stayed at the Orkney islands during this trip. However, the oldest of the sagas claim that it was Tora and not Elisaveta who accompanied Harald on the trip, which is considered more likely, as she was the cousin of Thorfinn Sigurdsson, Jarl of Orkney.

According to Adam of Bremen, the mother of King Olav Kyrre remarried either King Sweyn II of Denmark or an unnamed Swedish king (possibly King Haakon of Sweden) as a widow, but this is unconfirmed. It is also unknown whether this refers to the actual mother of Olav Kyrre, which would mean Tora Torbergsdatter, or his stepmother, which would mean Elisiv.

== Other sources ==
- Magnusson, Magnus; Pálsson, Hermann (1976) King Harald's Saga: Harald Hardradi of Norway: From Snorri Sturluson's Heimskringla (Penguin Classics) ISBN 978-0140441833
