= Lars Utne =

Norwegian sculptor

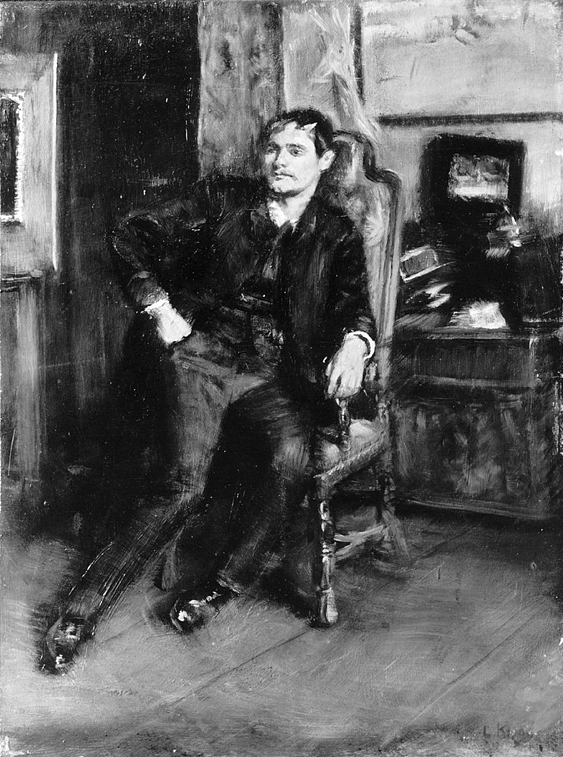
- Utne portrayed by Christian Krohg
- Born: 24 November 1862; Utne, Ullensvang Municipality, Norway
- Died: 8 August 1922 (aged 59); Asker Municipality, Norway
- Resting place: Vestre Gravlund
- Occupation: Sculptor
- Employer: Norwegian National Academy of Craft and Art Industry

Lars Utne (24 November 1862 – 8 August 1922) was a Norwegian sculptor. He decorated public buildings in Berlin, Leipzig and Oslo, and worked as instructor at the Norwegian National Academy of Craft and Art Industry.

== Personal life ==
Lars Utne was born in Utne in Ullensvang Municipality on 24 November 1862, a son of farmer and carpenter Jørund Amundsson Utne and Brita Jaastad. He was married twice, first to Elisabeth Christiane Semb, from 1887 to 1899, and second to Ragnhild Hafslo Qvam, from 1900.

== Career ==
Utne trained with woodcarver Lars Kinsarvik and sculptor Mathias Skeibrok, and further studied in Paris and Copenhagen.

He was associated with the workshop of Otto Lessing in Berlin, and contributed to decorations of public buildings, including the Reichstag building in Berlin, the Berlin Castle, and the Reichsgericht in Leipzig. From 1896 he settled in Oslo. In Oslo he made decorations for Nationaltheatret, the Museum of Cultural History, Oslo, the Norwegian Museum of Decorative Arts and Design, the Ministry of Justice building, and the headquarter of Bank of Norway. He also designed a relief for the monument to Harald Hardrada in Gamlebyen.

He lectured at the Norwegian National Academy of Craft and Art Industry from 1903 until his death.

He is represented at the National Museum of Norway, which has the bronze sculpture Gutten med beltet. Other works include a statue of Fridtjof Nansen, busts of Henrik Bull and of Wilhelm Krohg, a relief of Wilhelm II, a bust of Marcus Thrane, and a statue of Johan Hirsch.

Utne died in Asker on 8 August 1922. He is buried at Vestre Gravlund. His grave is decorated with a relief of Utne made by Torbjørn Aksåker.
