= Eystein Orre =

Norwegian noble (died 1066)

Eystein Orre (Old Norse: Eysteinn Orri; died 25 September 1066) was a Norwegian noble who was killed at the Battle of Stamford Bridge in 1066.

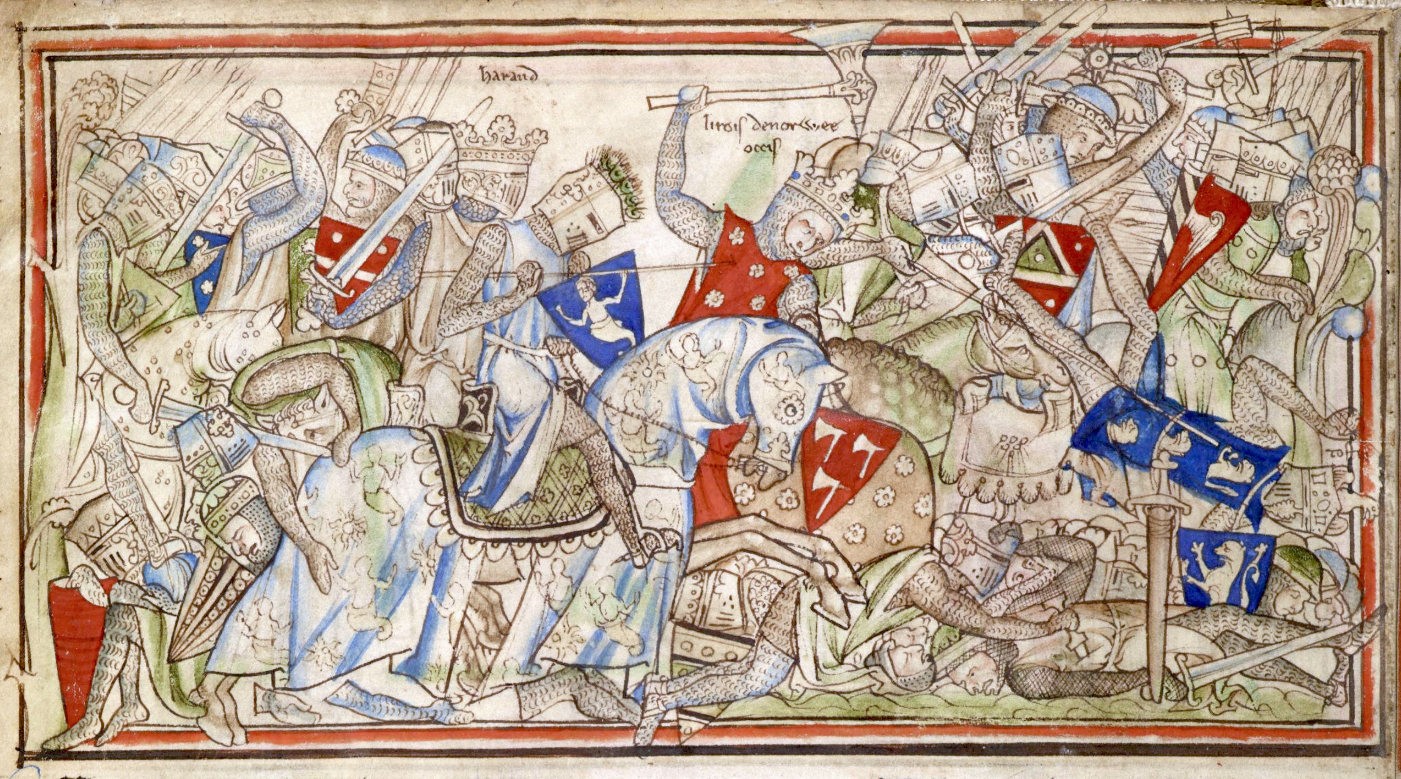
The Battle of Stamford Bridge as depicted by Matthew Paris.

Eystein was betrothed to Maria Haraldsdotter, daughter of King Harald Hardrada and Elisiv of Kiev. According to Heimskringla, he was "best beloved by the King of all the lendermen". Eystein was among those to accompany Harald in his invasion of England in 1066.

Harald and his army first encountered resistance at Scarborough, where the townsfolk refused to surrender. Harald resorted to burning down the town and this action led to other Northumbrian towns surrendering to him. The army sailed further down the Humber until they disembarked at Riccall. Harald's army then encountered the earls Morcar and Edwin; they fought against Harald's invading army 2 miles (3.2 km) south of York at the Battle of Fulford on 20 September. The battle was a decisive victory for the invaders, and led York to surrender to their forces on 24 September.

Early on 25 September, King Harald and Tostig left for York again, leaving a third of their forces behind. Eystein, along with Prince Olaf were among those left behind at Riccall to protect the ships, however a messenger came back calling for reinforcements as the English had intercepted the Norwegians at Stamford Bridge. But by the time Eyestein reached his comrades, King Harald had already been killed. Some of Eyestein's men were said to have collapsed and died of exhaustion upon reaching the battlefield.

Eyestein's men, unlike their comrades, were fully armed for battle (Note: The day was very hot, Harald and his men therefore laid aside their armour and left it with their ships.) and their counter-attack, described in the Norwegian tradition as Orre's Storm, briefly stalled the English advance. But it was soon overwhelmed and Orre was slain. With the Norwegian army routed and pursued by the English army, some of the fleeing Norsemen drowned in the rivers.

== Sources ==
- DeVries, Kelly (1999). The Norwegian Invasion of England in 1066. Boydell & Brewer Ltd. ISBN 978-0-85115-763-4.
