= Philip of Sweden =

12th-century King of Sweden

King of Sweden with Inge the Younger
- Reign: c. 1105/10–1118
- Predecessor: Inge the Elder
- Successor: Inge the Younger
- Spouse: Ingegerd of Norway
- House: Stenkil
- Father: Halsten Stenkilsson

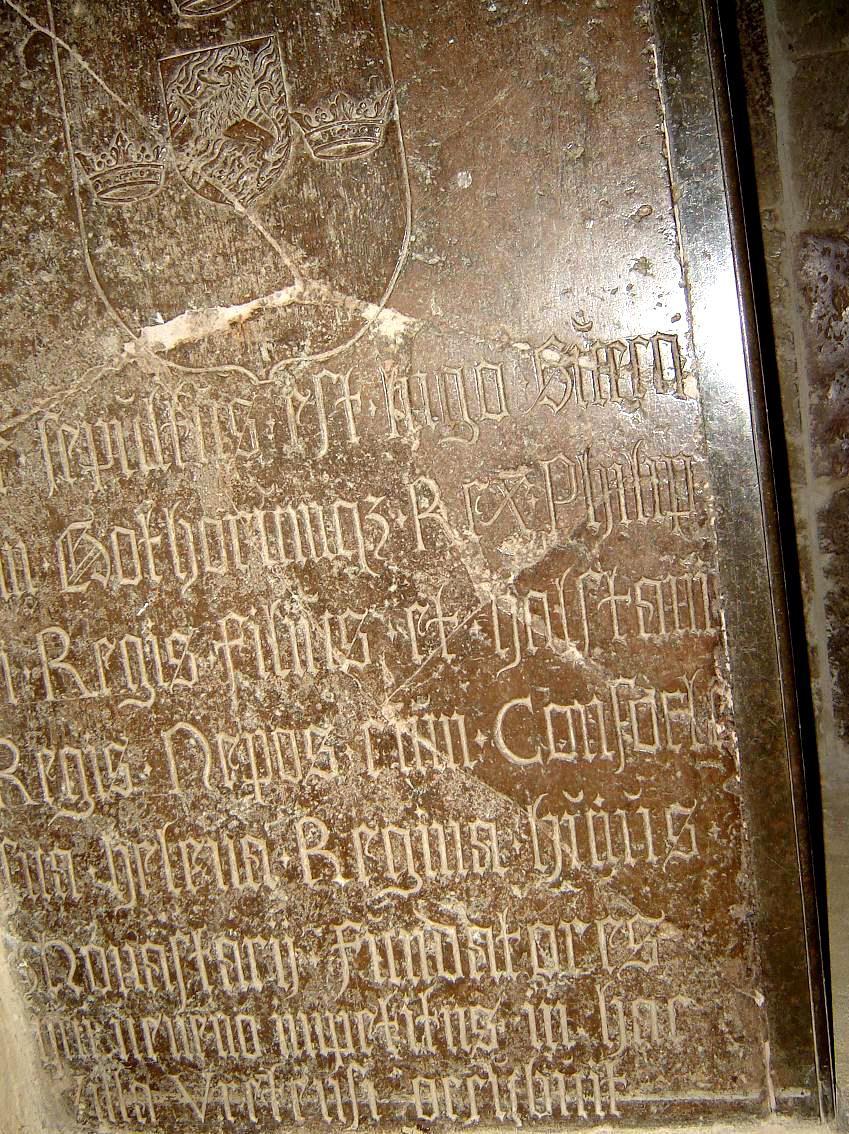
16th-century copy of a gravestone to King Inge the Younger at Vreta Abbey, with some inaccurate information on it, though probably placed correctly over his and King Philip's bones near the church's altar.

Philip or Filip (Swedish: Filip Halstensson) was King of Sweden from c. 1105–1110 until 1118.

Philip was a son of King Halsten Stenkilsson and nephew of King Inge the Elder. Philip and his brother Inge the Younger ruled together from 1105 or 1110 and onwards as successors of their uncle King Inge the Elder. According to the records of the Westrogothic law (Västgötalagen) he was a good king. Little else is known about him. Hardly any other Swedish king who was the undisputed ruler of the kingdom after the Christianization is less known than Philip.

According to the Hervarar saga, he ruled only for a short time and was married to Ingegard, the daughter of the Norwegian king Harald Hardrada. Philip was probably buried with his brother Inge in Vreta Abbey (Vreta kloster och kyrka) at Linköping in Östergötland, Sweden.

== Other sources ==
- David Williamson (1991) in Debrett's Kings and Queens of Europe (Salem House Publishing. p. 122) ISBN 978-0881623642

Filip House of Stenkil Died: 1118
Regnal titles
Preceded by Inge the Elder	King of Sweden c. 1105/10–1118 with Inge the Younger (1110–1118)	Succeeded by Inge the Younger
