= Harald Hardrada =

King of Norway from 1046 to 1066

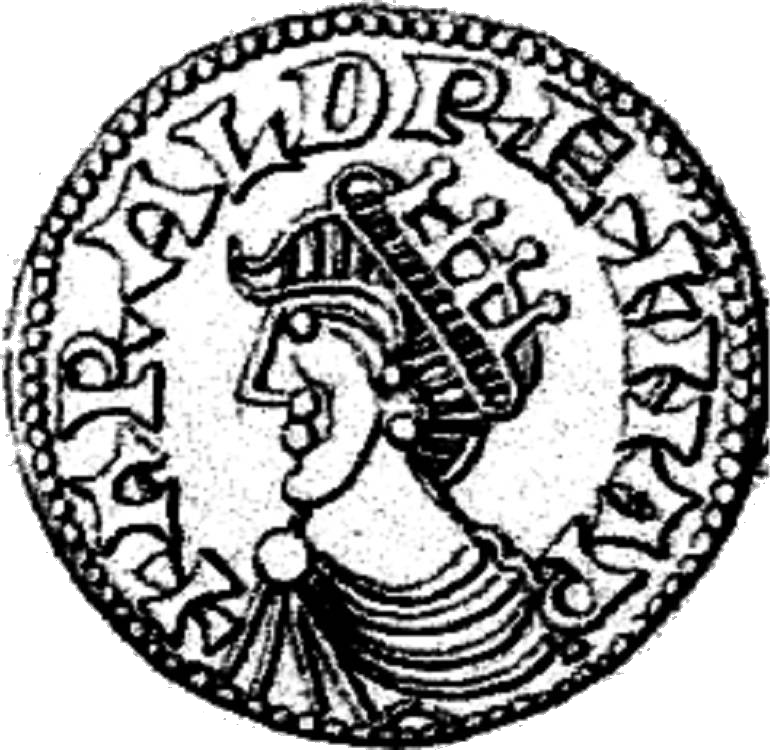
- Coin of Harald as the sole Norwegian king, "ARALD[us] REX NAR[vegiae]" (Note: Imitation of a type of Edward the Confessor.)

King of Norway
- Reign: 1046 – 25 September 1066
- Predecessor: Magnus I
- Successor: Magnus II
- Co-ruler: Magnus I (until 1047)
- Born: c. 1015; Ringerike, Norway
- Died: 25 September 1066 (aged 50–51); Stamford Bridge, Yorkshire, England
- Burial: Trondheim; Mary Church until 12th century, Helgeseter Priory until 17th century (demolished)
- Spouses: Elisiv of Kiev; Tora Torbergsdatter
- Issue: Ingegerd; Maria; Magnus II of Norway; Olaf III of Norway
Names
- Haraldr Sigurðarson
- House: Hardrada
- Father: Sigurd Syr
- Mother: Åsta Gudbrandsdatter
- Religion: Christian

Harald Sigurdsson (Old Norse: Haraldr Sigurðarson; c. 1015 – 25 September 1066), also known as Harald Hardrada or Harald III, was King of Norway from 1046 to 1066. He unsuccessfully claimed the Danish throne until 1064 and the English throne in 1066. Before becoming king, Harald spent 15 years in exile as a mercenary and military commander in Kievan Rus' and chief of the Varangian Guard in the Byzantine Empire. In his chronicle, Adam of Bremen called him the "Thunderbolt of the North".

In 1030, the fifteen-year-old Harald fought in the Battle of Stiklestad alongside his half-brother Olaf Haraldsson. Olaf sought to reclaim the Norwegian throne, which he had lost to Danish king Cnut two years previously. Olaf and Harald were defeated by forces loyal to Cnut, and Harald was forced into exile to Kievan Rus'. Thereafter, he was in the army of Grand Prince Yaroslav the Wise, becoming captain, until he moved on to Constantinople with his companions around 1034. In Constantinople, he rose quickly to become the commander of the Byzantine Varangian Guard, seeing action on the Mediterranean Sea, in Asia Minor, Sicily, possibly in the Holy Land, Bulgaria and in Constantinople itself, where he became involved in the imperial dynastic disputes. Harald amassed wealth whilst in the Byzantine Empire, which he shipped to Yaroslav in Kievan Rus' for safekeeping. In 1042, he left the Byzantine Empire, returning to Kievan Rus' to prepare to reclaim the Norwegian throne. In his absence the Norwegian throne had been restored from the Danes to Olaf's illegitimate son Magnus the Good.

In 1046, Harald joined forces with Magnus's rival in Denmark, the pretender Sweyn II of Denmark, raiding the Danish coast. Magnus, unwilling to fight his uncle, agreed to share the kingship with Harald, since Harald in turn would share his wealth with him. The co-rule ended abruptly the next year as Magnus died: Harald became the sole ruler of Norway. Domestically, Harald crushed opposition, and outlined the unification of Norway. Harald's reign was one of relative peace and stability, and he instituted a coin economy and foreign trade. Seeking to restore Cnut's "North Sea Empire", Harald claimed the Danish throne, and spent nearly every year until 1064 raiding the Danish coast and fighting his former ally, Sweyn. Although the campaigns were successful, he was never able to conquer Denmark.

Not long after Harald had renounced his claim to Denmark, the former earl of Northumbria, Tostig Godwinson, brother of English king Harold Godwinson, pledged his allegiance to Harald, inviting him to claim the English throne. Harald assented, invading northern England with 10,000 troops and 300 longships in September 1066, defeating the English regional forces of Northumbria and Mercia in the Battle of Fulford near York on 20 September. Harald was defeated and killed in a surprise attack by Harold Godwinson's forces in the Battle of Stamford Bridge on 25 September, which wiped out his army. Historians often consider Harald's death the end of the Viking Age.

== Epithets ==
Harald's most famous epithet is Old Norse harðráði, which has been translated variously as 'hard in counsel', 'tyrannical', 'tyrant', 'hard-ruler', 'ruthless', 'savage in counsel', 'tough', and 'severe'. While Judith Jesch has argued for 'severe' as the best translation, Alison Finlay and Anthony Faulkes prefer 'resolute'. Harðráði has traditionally been Anglicised as 'Hardrada', though Judith Jesch characterises this form as "a bastard Anglicisation of the original epithet in an oblique case".

This epithet predominates in the later Icelandic saga-tradition, but it is not clear if it was used during Harald's lifetime. In a number of independent sources associated with the British Isles, mostly earlier than the Icelandic sagas, Harald is given epithets deriving from Old Norse hárfagri (literally 'hair-beautiful', or more poetically 'fairhair'), including:

- Manuscript D of the Anglo-Saxon Chronicle ('Harold Harfagera', under the year 1066) and the related histories by Orderic Vitalis ('Harafagh', re events in 1066), John of Worcester ('Harvagra', s.aa. 1066 and 1098), and William of Malmesbury (Gesta regum Anglorum, 'Harvagre', regarding 1066).
- Marianus Scotus of Mainz ('Arbach', d. 1082/1083).
- The Life of Gruffydd ap Cynan ('Haralld Harfagyr', later twelfth century).

In Icelandic sagas the name Harald Fairhair is more famously associated with an earlier Norwegian king, and twentieth-century historians assumed that the name was attached to Harald Hardrada in error by Insular historians. However, recognising the independence of some of the Insular sources, historians have since favoured the idea that Harald Hardrada was widely known as Harald Fairhair, and indeed now doubt that the earlier Harald Fairhair existed in any form resembling the later saga-accounts.

Sverrir Jakobsson has suggested that 'fairhair' "might be the name by which King Harald wished himself to be known. It must have been his opponents who gave him the epithet 'severe' (ON. harðráði), by which he is generally known in thirteenth-century Old Norse kings' sagas".

== Early life ==
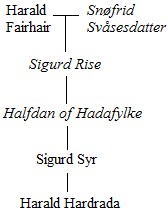
Harald's ancestry according to the younger sagas. Individuals whose existence is disputed by modern historians are in italics.

Harald was born in Ringerike, Norway, in 1015 (or possibly 1016) (Note: The sagas mention that Harald was fifteen years old at the time of the Battle of Stiklestad (1030).) to Åsta Gudbrandsdatter and her second husband Sigurd Syr. Sigurd was a petty king of Ringerike, and among the strongest and wealthiest chieftains in the Uplands. Through his mother Åsta, Harald was the youngest of three half-brothers to King Olaf Haraldsson (later Saint Olaf). In his youth, Harald displayed traits of a typical rebel with big ambitions, and admired Olaf as his role model. He thus differed from his two older brothers, who were more similar to their father, down-to-earth and mostly concerned with maintaining the farm.

The Icelandic sagas, in particular Snorri Sturluson in Heimskringla, claim that Sigurd, like Olaf's father, was a great-grandson of King Harald Fairhair in the male line. Most modern scholars believe that the ancestors attributed to Harald Hardrada's father, along with other parts of the Fairhair genealogy, are inventions reflecting the political and social expectations of the time of the authors (around two centuries after Harald Hardrada's lifetime) rather than historical reality. Harald Hardrada's alleged descent from Harald Fairhair is not mentioned and played no part during Harald Hardrada's own time, which seems odd considering that it would have provided significant legitimacy in connection with his claim to the Norwegian throne.

Following a revolt in 1028, Harald's brother Olaf was forced into exile until he returned to Norway in early 1030. On hearing news of Olaf's planned return, Harald gathered 600 men from the Uplands to meet Olaf and his men upon their arrival in the east of Norway. After a friendly welcome, Olaf went on to gather an army and eventually fight in the Battle of Stiklestad on 29 July 1030, in which Harald took part on his brother's side. The battle was part of an attempt to restore Olaf to the Norwegian throne, which had been captured by the Danish king Cnut the Great (Canute). The battle resulted in defeat for the brothers at the hands of those Norwegians who were loyal to Cnut, and Olaf was killed while Harald was badly wounded. Harald was nonetheless remarked to have shown considerable military talent during the battle.

== Exile in the East ==
=== To Kievan Rus' ===
After the defeat at the Battle of Stiklestad, Harald managed to escape with the aid of Rögnvald Brusason (later Earl of Orkney) to a remote farm in Eastern Norway. He stayed there for some time to heal his wounds, and thereafter (possibly up to a month later) journeyed north over the mountains to Sweden. A year after the Battle of Stiklestad, Harald arrived in Kievan Rus' (referred to in the sagas as Garðaríki or Svíþjóð hin mikla). He likely spent at least part of his time in the town of Staraya Ladoga (Aldeigjuborg), arriving there in the first half of 1031. Harald and his men were welcomed by Grand Prince Yaroslav the Wise, whose wife Ingegerd was a distant relative of Harald. Badly in need of military leaders, Yaroslav recognised a military potential in Harald and made him a captain of his forces. Harald's brother Olaf Haraldsson had previously been in exile to Yaroslav following the revolt in 1028, and Morkinskinna says that Yaroslav embraced Harald first and foremost because he was the brother of Olaf. Harald took part in Yaroslav's campaign against the Poles in 1031, and possibly also fought against other 1030s Kievan enemies and rivals such as the Chudes in Estonia, and the Byzantines, as well as the Pechenegs and other steppe nomad people.

=== In Byzantine service ===
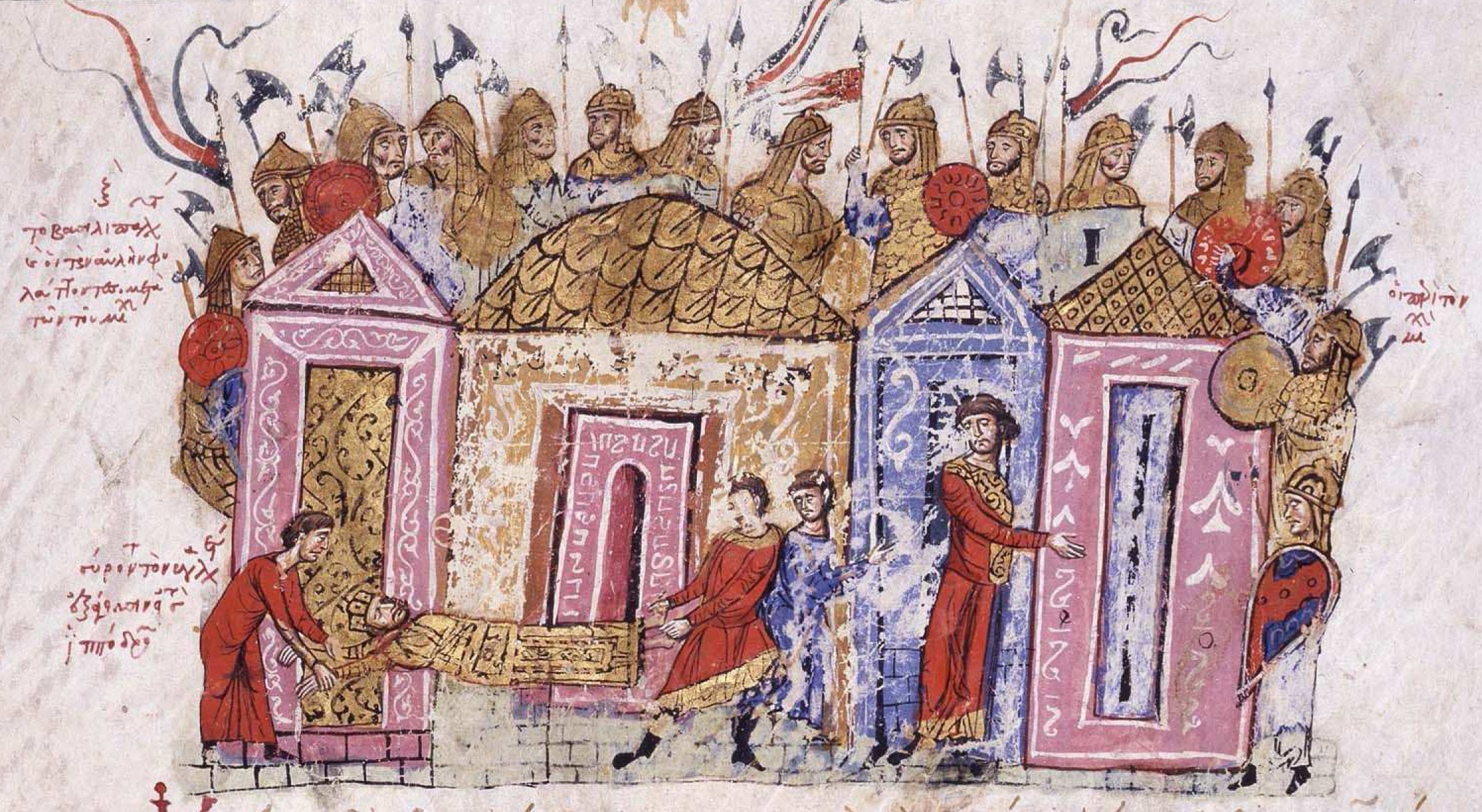
Near-contemporary depiction of Byzantine Varangian Guardsmen, in an illumination from the Skylitzes Synopsis

After a few years in Kievan Rus', Harald and his force of around 500 men moved on south to Constantinople (Miklagard), the capital of the Byzantine Empire, probably in 1033 or 1034, where they joined the Varangian Guard. Although the Flateyjarbók maintains that Harald at first sought to keep his royal identity a secret, most sources agree that Harald and his men's reputation was well known in the east at the time. While the Varangian Guard was primarily meant to function as the emperor's bodyguard, Harald was found fighting on "nearly every frontier" of the empire. He first saw action in campaigns against Arab pirates in the Mediterranean Sea, and then in inland towns in Asia Minor / Anatolia that had supported the pirates. By this time, he had, according to Snorri Sturluson (a 12th-century Icelandic historian, poet, and politician), become the "leader over all the Varangians". By 1035, the Byzantines had pushed the Arabs out of Asia Minor to the east and southeast, and Harald took part in campaigns that went as far east as the Tigris River and Euphrates River in Mesopotamia, where according to his skald (poet) Þjóðólfr Arnórsson (recounted in the sagas) he participated in the capture of eighty Arab strongholds, a number which historians Sigfus Blöndal and Benedikt Benedikz see no particular reason to question. Although not holding independent command of an army as the sagas imply, it is not unlikely that King Harald and the Varangians at times could have been sent off to capture a castle or town. During the first four years of the reign of Byzantine Emperor Michael IV the Paphlagonian, Harald probably also fought in campaigns against the Pechenegs.

Thereafter, Harald is reported in the sagas to have gone to Jerusalem and fought in battles in the area. Although the sagas place this after his expedition to Sicily, historian Kelly DeVries has questioned that chronology. Whether his trip was of a military or peaceful nature would depend on whether it took place before or after the 1036 peace treaty between Michael IV and the Muslim Fatimid Caliph Ma'ad al-Mustansir Billah (in reality the Caliph's mother, originally a Byzantine Christian, since the Caliph was a minor), although it is considered unlikely to have been made before. Modern historians have speculated that Harald may have been in a party sent to escort pilgrims to Jerusalem (possibly including members of the Imperial family) following the peace agreement, as it was also agreed that the Byzantines were allowed to repair the Church of the Holy Sepulchre. Furthermore, this may in turn have presented Harald with opportunities to fight against bandits who preyed on Christian pilgrims.

In 1038, Harald joined the Byzantines in their expedition to Sicily, in George Maniakes' (the sagas' "Gyrge") attempt to reconquer the island from the Muslim Saracens, who had established the Emirate of Sicily on the island. During the campaign, Harald fought alongside Norman mercenaries such as William Iron Arm in the battles fought at Messina and Rometta, and also played a vital role in capturing Syracuse. According to Snorri Sturluson, Harald captured four towns on Sicily. In 1041, when the Byzantine expedition to Sicily was over, a Lombard-Norman revolt erupted in southern Italy, and Harald led the Varangian Guard in multiple battles. Harald fought with the Catepan of Italy, Michael Dokeianos with initial success, but the Normans, led by their former ally William Iron Arm, defeated the Byzantines in the Battle of Olivento in March, and in the Battle of Montemaggiore in May. After the defeat, Harald and the Varangian Guard were called back to Constantinople, following Maniakes's imprisonment by the emperor and the onset of other more pressing issues. Harald and the Varangians were thereafter sent to fight in the southeastern European frontier in Bulgaria, where they arrived in late 1041. There, he fought in the army of Emperor Michael IV in the Battle of Ostrovo of the 1041 campaign against the Bulgarian uprising led by Peter Delyan, which later gained Harald the nickname the "Bulgar-burner" (Bolgara brennir) by his skald.

Harald was not affected by Maniakes's conflict with Emperor Michael IV, and received honours and respect upon his return to Constantinople. In a Greek book written in the 1070s, the Strategikon of Kekaumenos, Araltes (i.e. Harald) is said to have won the favour of the emperor. The book says that the Byzantine emperor first appointed him manglabites (possibly identified with the title protospatharios), a soldier of the imperial guard, after the Sicilian campaign. Following the campaign against the Bulgarians, in which Harald again served with distinction, he received the rank while at Mosynopolis of spatharokandidatos, identified by DeVries as a promotion to the possibly third highest Byzantine rank, but by Mikhail Bibikov as a lesser rank than protospatharios that was ordinarily awarded to foreign allies to the emperor. The Strategikon indicates that the ranks awarded to Harald were rather low, since Harald reportedly was "not angry for just having been appointed to manglabites or spatharokandidatos". According to his skald Þjóðólfr Arnórsson, Harald had participated in eighteen greater battles during his Byzantine service. Harald's favour at the imperial court quickly declined after the death of Michael IV in December 1041, which was followed by conflicts between the new emperor Michael V and the powerful empress Zoe.

During the turmoil, Harald was arrested and imprisoned, but the sources disagree on the grounds. The sagas state that Harald was arrested for defrauding the emperor of his treasure, as well as for requesting marriage with an apparently fictional niece or granddaughter of Zoe, called Maria (his suit supposedly being turned down by the empress because she wanted to marry Harald herself). William of Malmesbury states that Harald was arrested for defiling a noble woman, while according to Saxo Grammaticus he was imprisoned for murder. DeVries suggests that the new emperor may have feared Harald because of his loyalty to the previous emperor. The sources also disagree on how Harald got out of prison, but he may have been helped by someone outside to escape in the midst of the revolt that had begun against the new emperor. The Morkinskinna suggests that he was rescued by a rich and pious Byzantine widow.

While some of the Varangians helped guard the emperor, Harald became the leader of the Varangians who supported the revolt. The emperor was in the end dragged out of his sanctuary, blinded and exiled to a monastery, and the sagas claim that it was Harald himself who blinded Michael V (or at least claimed to have done so). Blinding was a standard penalty for deposed Byzantine emperors and it was probably carried out under Harald's supervision, not as a heroic act of vengeance, but as part of his duties as an officer commanding a unit of the imperial guard.

=== Back to Kievan Rus' ===
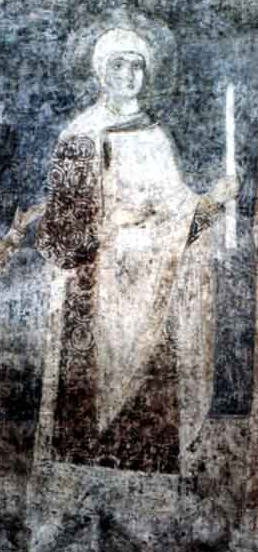
Harald's wife Elisiv of Kiev, daughter of Yaroslav the Wise

Harald became extremely rich during his time in the east, and secured the wealth collected in Constantinople by shipments to Kievan Rus' for safekeeping (with Yaroslav the Wise acting as safekeeper for his fortune). The sagas note that aside from the significant spoils of battle he had retained, he had participated three times in polutasvarf (loosely translated as "palace-plunder"), a term which implies either the pillaging of the palace exchequer on the death of the emperor, or perhaps the disbursement of funds to the Varangians by the new emperor in order to ensure their loyalty. It is likely that the money Harald made while serving in Constantinople allowed him to fund his claim for the crown of Norway. If he participated in polutasvarf three times, these occasions must have been the deaths of Romanos III, Michael IV, and Michael V, in which Harald would have opportunities, beyond his legitimate revenues, to carry off immense wealth.

After Zoe had been restored to the throne in June 1042 together with Constantine IX, Harald requested to be allowed to return to Norway. Constantine and Zoe refused to allow this, due to him being an experienced and competent military commander, as well as due to his influence on the Varangians. However, Harald managed to escape into the Bosphorus with two ships and some loyal followers. Although the second ship was destroyed by the Byzantine cross-strait iron chains, Harald's ship sailed safely into the Black Sea after successfully manoeuvring over the barrier. Despite this, Kekaumenos lauds the "loyalty and love" Harald had for the empire, which he reportedly maintained even after he returned to Norway and became king. Following his escape from Constantinople, Harald arrived back in Kievan Rus' later in 1042. During his second stay there, he married Elisabeth (referred to in Scandinavian sources as Ellisif), daughter of Yaroslav the Wise and granddaughter of the Swedish king Olof Skötkonung. Shortly after Harald's arrival in Kiev, Yaroslav attacked Constantinople, and it is considered likely that Harald provided him with valuable information about the state of the empire.

It is possible that the marriage with Elisiv had been agreed to already during Harald's first time in Rus', or that they at least had been acquainted. During his service in the Byzantine Empire, Harald composed a love poem which included the verse "Yet the goddess in Gardarike / will not accept my gold rings" (whom Snorri Sturluson identifies with Elisiv), although Morkinskinna claims that Harald had to remind Yaroslav of the promised marriage when he returned to Kiev. According to the same source, Harald had spoken with Yaroslav during his first time in Rus', requesting to marry Elisiv, only to be rejected because he was not yet wealthy enough. It is in any case significant that Harald was allowed to marry the daughter of Yaroslav, since his other children were married to figures such as Henry I of France, Andrew I of Hungary and the daughter of Constantine IX.

== King of Norway ==
=== Return to Scandinavia ===
Seeking to regain for himself the kingdom lost by his half-brother Olaf Haraldsson, Harald began his journey westwards in early 1045, departing from Novgorod (Holmgard) to Staraya Ladoga (Aldeigjuborg) where he obtained a ship. His journey went through Lake Ladoga, down the Neva River, and then into the Gulf of Finland and the Baltic Sea. He arrived in Sigtuna in Sweden, probably at the end of 1045 or in early 1046. When he arrived in Sweden, according to the skald Tjodolv Arnorsson, his ship was unbalanced by its heavy load of gold. In Harald's absence, the throne of Norway had been restored to Magnus the Good, an illegitimate son of Olaf. Harald may actually have known this, and it could have been the reason why Harald wanted to return to Norway in the first place. Since Cnut the Great's sons - Harthacnut and Harold Harefoot - had abandoned Norway, Magnus's position as king had been secured. No domestic threats or insurrections are recorded to have occurred during his eleven-year reign. After the death of Harthacnut left the Danish throne vacant, Magnus was also elected king of Denmark, and managed to defeat the Danish royal pretender Sweyn Estridsson.

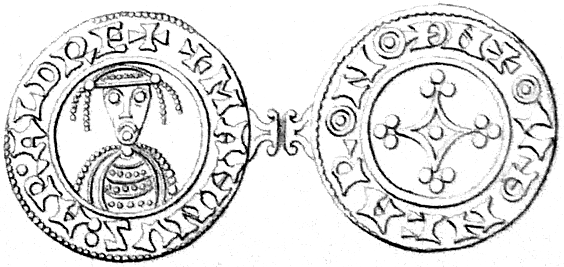
Coin with the legend "MAHNUS ARALD REX". Generally held to date from Magnus and Harald's short co-rule, depicting Magnus who had precedence, but also speculated as Harald's alone, with Magnus an epithet adopted after his death.

Having heard of Sweyn's defeat, Harald met up with him as well as with the Swedish king Anund Jacob, and the three joined forces against Magnus. Their first military exploit consisted of raiding the Danish coast. The purpose of that was to impress the natives by demonstrating that Magnus offered them no protection, and thus leading them to submit to Harald and Sweyn. Learning about their actions, Magnus knew that their next target would be Norway. Harald may have planned to be taken as king of his father's petty kingdom, and thereafter claim the rest of the country. In any case, the people were unwilling to turn against Magnus, and on hearing news of Harald's schemes, Magnus (abroad at the time) went home to Norway with his entire army. Instead of going to war, Magnus's advisors recommended the young king not fight his uncle, and a compromise was reached in 1046 in which Harald would rule Norway (not Denmark) jointly with Magnus (although Magnus would have precedence). Notably, Harald also had to agree to share half of his wealth with Magnus, who at the time was badly in need of funds. During their short co-rule, Harald and Magnus had separate courts and kept to themselves, and their only recorded meetings nearly ended in physical clashes.

In 1047, Magnus and Harald went to Denmark with their leidang forces. Later that year in Jylland, less than a year into their co-rule, Magnus died without an heir. Before his death, he had decided that Sweyn was to inherit Denmark and Harald to inherit Norway. On hearing the news of Magnus's death, Harald quickly gathered the local leaders in Norway and, declaring himself king of Norway as well as of Denmark, prepared ousting his former ally from the Denmark. However, the army and the chieftains, headed by Einar Thambarskelfir, opposed any plans of invading Denmark. Although Harald himself objected to bringing the body of Magnus back to Norway, the Norwegian army prepared to transport his body to Nidaros (now Trondheim), where they buried him next to Saint Olaf in late 1047. Einar, an opponent of Harald, claimed that "to follow Magnus dead was better than to follow any other king alive".

Under Harald's rule, Norway introduced a royal monopoly on the minting of coins. The coins minted under Harald's rule appear to have been accepted as a commonly used currency (as opposed to continued use of primarily foreign-minted coins). Minting of coins likely provided a substantial part of Harald's annual revenues.

=== Invasions of Denmark ===
Harald also wanted to re-establish Magnus's rule over Denmark, and in the long term probably sought to restore Cnut the Great's "North Sea Empire" in its entirety. While his first proposal to invade Denmark fell through, the next year Harald embarked on what would turn into constant warfare against Sweyn, from 1048 almost yearly until 1064. Similar to his campaigns (then together with Sweyn) against Magnus's rule in Denmark, most of his campaigns against Sweyn consisted of swift and violent raids on the Danish coasts. In 1048, he plundered Jutland, and in 1049 he pillaged and burned Hedeby, at the time the most important Danish trade center, and one of the best protected and most populous towns in Scandinavia. Hedeby as a civil town never recovered from Harald's destruction, and was left completely desolate when what remained was looted by Slavic tribes in 1066. One of two conventional battles was set to be fought between the two kings later the same year, but, according to Saxo Grammaticus, Sweyn's smaller army was so frightened when approached by the Norwegians that they chose to jump in the water trying to escape; most drowned. Although Harald was victorious in most of the engagements, he was never successful in occupying Denmark.

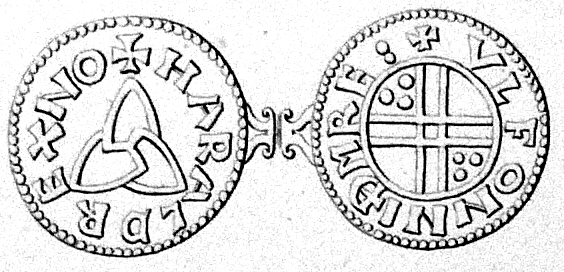
Penny minted by Harald, with a triquetra on the obverse, used both by Christians and in Norse paganism. It was used on coins in Denmark by Cnut the Great and his sons, (Note: Cnut himself had adopted the triquetra from earlier Norse uses, viewing himself as a Scylding. His successors also used the symbol, and Harald in turn probably adopted it in order to claim his right to Denmark as heir to Magnus the Good and the Scyldings.) and Harald probably adopted it as part of his claim to the Danish throne.

The second, more significant battle, a naval encounter, was the Battle of Niså on 9 August 1062. As Harald had not been able to conquer Denmark despite his raids, he wanted to win a decisive victory over Sweyn. He eventually set out from Norway with a great army and a fleet of around 300 ships. Sweyn had also prepared for the battle, which had been preassigned a time and place. Sweyn did not appear at the agreed time, and Harald thus sent home his non-professional soldiers (bóndaherrinn), which had made up half of his forces. When the dismissed ships were out of reach, Sweyn's fleet finally appeared, possibly also with 300 ships. The battle resulted in great bloodshed as Harald defeated the Danes (70 Danish ships were reportedly left "empty"), but many ships and men managed to escape, including Sweyn. During the battle, Harald actively shot with his bow, like most others in the early phase of the battle.

Fatigue and the huge cost of the indecisive battles eventually led Harald to seek peace with Sweyn, and in 1064 (or 1065 according to Morkinskinna) the two kings agreed on an unconditional peace agreement. By the agreement, they retained their respective kingdoms with the former boundaries, and there would be no payments of reparations. In the subsequent winter of 1065, Harald travelled through his realm and accused the farmers of withholding taxes from him. In response, he acted with brutality, and had people maimed and killed as a warning to those who disobeyed him. Harald maintained control of his nation through the use of his hird, a private standing army maintained by Norwegian lords. Harald's contribution to the strengthening of Norway's monarchy was the enforcement of a policy that only the king could retain a hird, thus centralising power away from local warlords.

=== Domestic opposition ===
According to historian Knut Helle, Harald completed the first phase of what he has termed the "national territorial unification of Norway". Having forced his way to the kingship, Harald would have to convince the aristocracy that he was the right person to rule Norway alone. To establish domestic alliances, he married Tora Torbergsdatter of one of the most powerful Norwegian families. The primary opposition to Harald's rule would be the descendants of Haakon Sigurdsson, from the powerful dynasty of Earls of Lade who had controlled Northern Norway and Trøndelag with much autonomy under the Norwegian king. Haakon had even ruled the whole of Norway (nominally under the Danish king) from 975 until 995, when he was killed during the takeover by Olaf Tryggvasson. Even after Haakon's death, his offspring held a certain degree of sovereignty in the north, and by Harald's early reign the family was headed by Einar Thambarskelfir, who was married to Haakon's daughter. While the family had maintained good relations with Magnus, Harald's absolutism and consolidation of the kingship soon led to conflict with Einar.

It was from his power-struggle with the Norwegian aristocracy that Harald got himself the reputation that gave him the nickname "Hardrada", or "the hard ruler". Although the relationship between Harald and Einar was poor from the start, confrontation did not occur before Harald went north to his court in Nidaros. One time in Nidaros, Einar arrived at Harald's court, and in a display of power was accompanied by "eight or nine longships and almost five hundred men", obviously seeking confrontation. Harald was not provoked by the incident. Although the sources differ on the circumstances, the next event nonetheless led to the murder of Einar by Harald's men, which threatened to throw Norway into a state of civil war. Although the remaining descendants of Haakon Sigurdsson considered rebellion against the king, Harald eventually managed to negotiate peace with them, and secured the family's submission for the remainder of his reign. By the death of Einar and his son around 1050, the Earls of Lade had outplayed their role as a base of opposition, and Trøndelag was definitely subordinated to Harald's national kingdom.

Before the Battle of Niså, Harald had been joined by Haakon Ivarsson, who distinguished himself in the battle and gained Harald's favour. Harald reportedly even considered giving Haakon the title of Earl, and Haakon was greatly upset when Harald later backed down from his promise. With a strong hold over the Uplands, Haakon was additionally given the earldom of Värmland by the Swedish king Stenkil. In early 1064, Haakon entered the Uplands and collected their taxes, the region thus effectively threatened to renounce their loyalty to Harald in response. The revolt of Haakon and the farmers in the Uplands may have been the main reason why Harald finally had been willing to enter a peace agreement with Sweyn Estridsson. After the agreement, Harald went to Oslo and sent tax collectors to the Uplands, only to find that the farmers would withhold their taxes until Haakon arrived. In response, Harald entered Sweden with an army and quickly defeated Haakon. Still facing opposition from the farmers, Harald embarked on a campaign to crush the areas that had withheld their taxes. Due to the remote location of the region in the interior of the country, the Uplands had never been an integrated part of the Norwegian king's realm. Using harsh measures, Harald burned down farms and small villages, and had people maimed and killed. Starting in Romerike, his campaign continued into Hedmark, Hadeland and Ringerike. Since the regions contained several rich rural communities, Harald strengthened his economic position by confiscating farming estates. By the end of 1065 there was probably peace in Norway, as any opposition had either been killed, chased into exile or silenced.

=== Policies ===
Harald's reign was marked by his background as a military commander, as he often solved disputes with a brute force. One of his skalds even boasted about how Harald broke settlements he had made, in his battles in the Mediterranean. While the sagas largely focus on Harald's war with Sweyn and the invasion of England, little is said about his domestic policies. Modern historians have taken this as a sign that, despite his absolute monarchy, his reign was one of peace and progress for Norway. Harald is considered to have instituted good economic policies, as he developed a Norwegian currency and a viable coin economy, which in turn allowed Norway to participate in international trade. He initiated trade with Kievan Rus' and the Byzantine Empire through his connections, as well as with Scotland and Ireland. According to the later sagas, Harald founded Oslo, where he spent much time.

Harald also continued to advance Christianity in Norway, and archaeological excavations show that churches were built and improved during his reign. He also imported bishops, priests and monks from abroad, especially from Kievan Rus' and the Byzantine Empire. A slightly different form of Christianity was thus introduced in Norway from the rest of northern Europe. Harald's misusing funds from the pilgrimage to Nidaros as well as his bringing bishops to the country who were either not consecrated in France and England or not consecrated at all, brought him into conflict with Archbishop Adalbert of Hamburg-Bremen. When the Archbishop's legates protested, Harald reportedly responded that "he did not know of any other archbishop or lord of Norway than the king himself". Norwegian historian Halvdan Koht has remarked that the "words seemed as if spoken by a Byzantine despot". It is possible that Harald maintained contacts with Byzantine emperors after he became king, which could suggest a background for his church policies.

=== Northern explorations ===
Once he had returned to Norway, Harald seems to have displayed an interest in exploring his own realm, as for instance the Morkinskinna recounts Harald's trip into the Uplands. Harald is also said to have explored the seas beyond his kingdom, as the contemporary Adam of Bremen reports of such naval expeditions conducted by Harald:

The most enterprising Prince Haraldr of the Norwegians lately attempted this [sea]. Who, having searched thoroughly the length of the northern ocean in ships, finally had before his eyes the dark failing boundaries of the savage world, and, by retracing his steps, with difficulty barely escaped the deep abyss in safety.

— Adam of Bremen, Gesta Hammaburgensis ecclesiae pontificum, 4. XXXIX

Kelly DeVries has suggested that Harald "may even have known of and sought out the legendary land called Vinland, which Viking sailors had discovered only a short time before", which Adam mentions earlier in the same passage to have been widely reported in Denmark and Norway. H. H. Lamb has on the other hand proposed that the land he reached may have been either Spitsbergen or Novaya Zemlya.

== Invasion of England ==
=== Background and preparations ===
Route taken by Harald's fleet, 1066

Accepting he could not conquer Denmark, Harald switched attention to England; his claim was based on a 1038 agreement between Magnus and its previous ruler, Harthacnut, who died childless in 1042. The agreement stated that if either die, the other would inherit his lands, but it was unlikely Magnus assumed he would gain the English throne without fighting. Harthacnut himself preferred his half-brother, Edward the Confessor, who became king with the backing of Earl Godwin, father of Harold Godwinson. Plans by Magnus to invade England in 1045 were suspended, while he dealt with an uprising by Sweyn Estridsson of Denmark.

After Magnus died in 1047, Harald took over his claim. Edward kept potential enemies happy by hinting they might succeed him; in addition to Harald, these included Sweyn and Duke William II of Normandy. In 1058, a fleet under Harald's son Magnus supported a large scale Welsh raid into England, although details are limited. This may have shown Harald that he could not simultaneously fight Denmark and England; this became crucial when Edward died in January 1066, and Harold Godwinson was proclaimed king of England.

Harold's brother Tostig Godwinson, formerly Earl of Northumbria, hoping to regain his titles and lands, reportedly approached both William and Sweyn Estridsson for their support. Since Northern England was the most suitable landing place for a Norwegian invasion, he was more valuable to Harald. Details are limited, but it is suggested Tostig sent a fellow exile, Copsig, to meet with Harald in Norway and agree plans, while he remained in France. If correct, this would also have allowed Tostig to increase both their chances by simultaneously supporting an invasion by William, who also claimed the throne. In March or April 1066, Harald began assembling his fleet at Utvær (in the present-day Solund Municipality), in the Sognefjord, a process completed by the start of September 1066; it included his flagship, Ormen, or "Serpent". Before leaving Norway, he had Magnus proclaimed king of Norway, and left Tora behind, taking with him Elisiv, his daughters, and Olaf. En route, he stopped at the Norwegian-held islands of Shetland and Orkney, where he collected additional troops, including Paul and Erlend Thorfinnsson, the jarls of Orkney. At Dunfermline, he met Tostig's ally, Malcolm III of Scotland, who gave him around 2,000 Scottish soldiers.

Although he possibly also met Tostig there, most sources suggest they linked up at Tynemouth, on 8 September, Harald bringing around 10–15,000 men, on 240–300 longships. Tostig had only 12 ships, his connections being far more significant. The chronicler, John of Worcester, suggests he left Flanders in May or June, raiding the heartland of Harold's estates in southern England, from the Isle of Wight to Sandwich. Having made it seem an attack from Normandy was imminent, he then sailed north, while his brother and most of his troops remained in the south, waiting for William.

=== Early raids, invasion, and Battle of Fulford ===
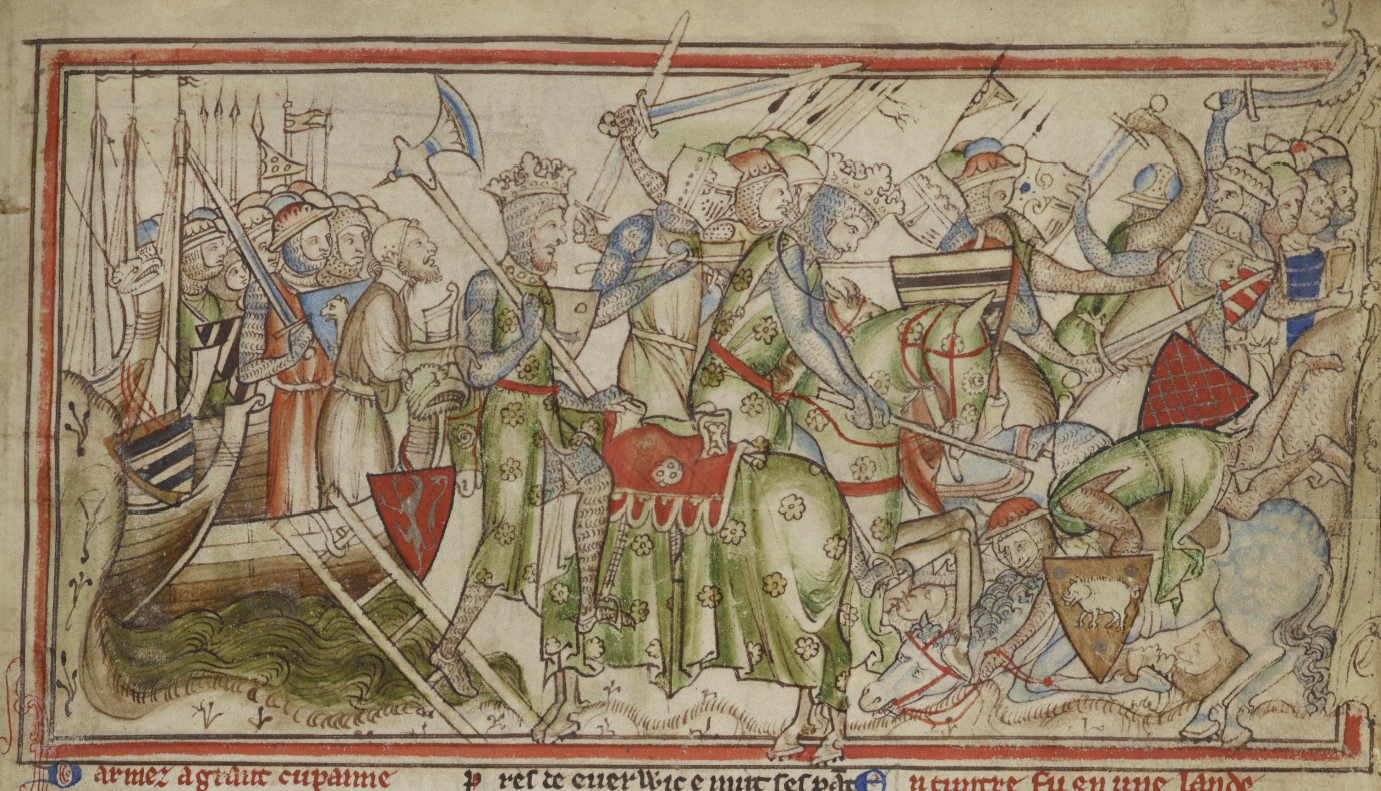
Harald landing near York (left), and defeating the Northumbrian army (right), from the 13th-century chronicle The Life of King Edward the Confessor by Matthew Paris

After embarking from Tynemouth, Harald and Tostig probably landed at the River Tees. They then entered Cleveland, and started plundering the coast. They encountered the first resistance at Scarborough, where Harald's demand for surrender was opposed. In the end, Harald resorted to burning down the town, and this action led to other Northumbrian towns surrendering to him. After further raiding, Harald and Tostig sailed up the Humber and then the Ouse, disembarking at Riccall on 20 September. News of the early raids had reached the earls Morcar of Northumbria and Edwin of Mercia, and they fought against Harald's invading army three kilometres (2 mi) south of York at the Battle of Fulford, also on 20 September. The battle was a decisive victory for Harald and Tostig, and led York to surrender to their forces on 24 September. This was the last time a Scandinavian army defeated English forces. The same day as York surrendered to Harald and Tostig, Harold Godwinson arrived with his army in Tadcaster, just eleven kilometres (7 mi) from the anchored Norwegian fleet at Riccall. From there, he probably scouted the Norwegian fleet, preparing a surprise attack. As Harald had left no forces in York, Harold Godwinson marched right through the town to Stamford Bridge.

=== Battle of Stamford Bridge ===
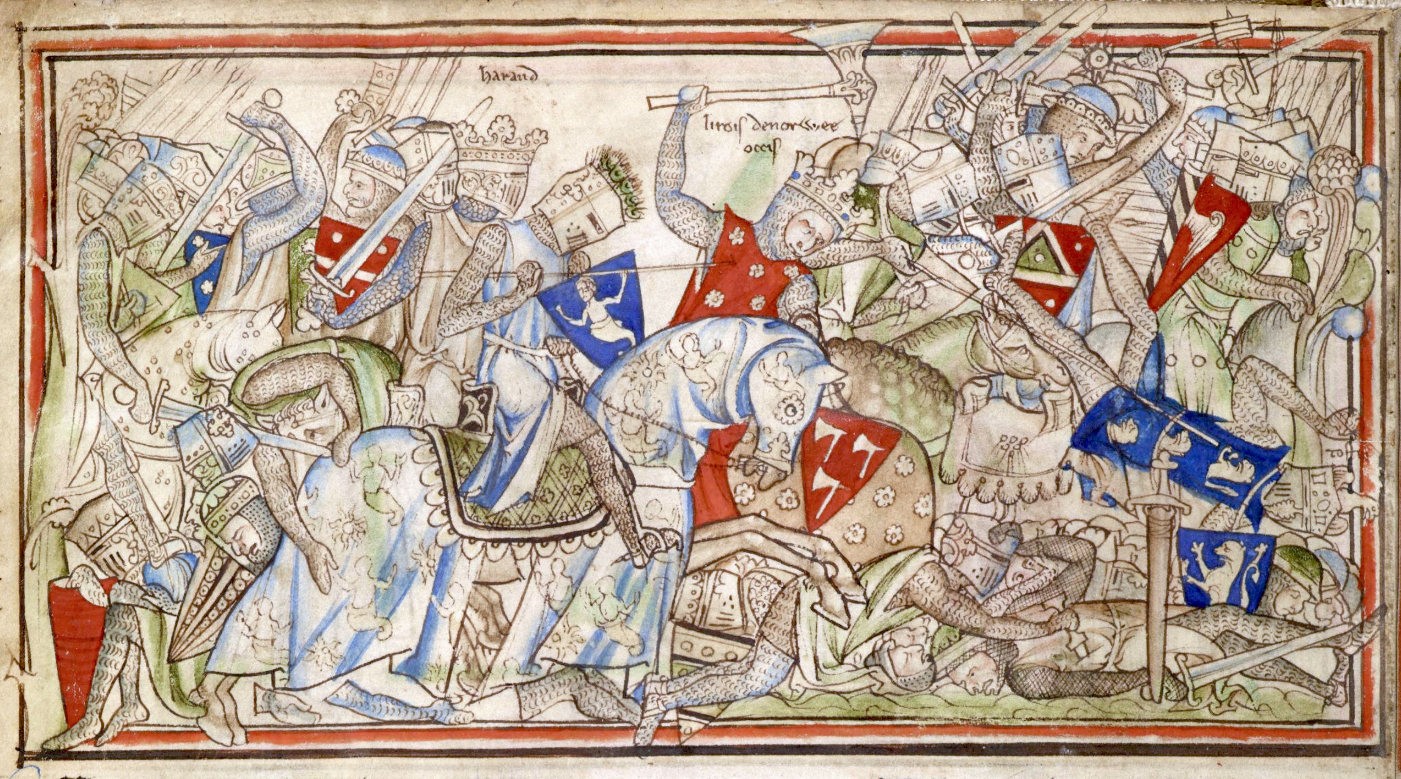
Harald at Stamford Bridge. Matthew Paris may have attributed the axe to Harald due to its general Norse association, or the royal iconography around St. Olaf. According to the sagas, Harald wore a blue tunic and helmet, wielded a sword, and Landøyðan as his royal standard, but not his mail-shirt ("Emma") and shield, which was left at Riccall.

Early on 25 September, Harald and Tostig departed their landing place at Riccall with most of their forces, but left a third of their forces behind. They brought only light armour, as they expected to just meet the citizens of York, as they had agreed the day before, at Stamford Bridge to decide on who should manage the town under Harald. Once there Harald saw Godwinson's forces approaching, heavily armed and armoured, and greatly outnumbering Harald's. Although (according to non-saga sources) the English forces were held up at the bridge for some time by a single gigantic Norwegian, allowing Harald and Tostig to regroup into a shield-wall formation, Harald's army was in the end heavily beaten. Harald was struck in the throat by an arrow and killed early in the battle, later termed the Battle of Stamford Bridge, in a state of berserkergang, having worn no body armour and fought aggressively with both hands around his sword.

When the battle was almost over, some reserve forces from Riccall led by Eystein Orre finally appeared, but they were exhausted as they had run all the way. Eystein picked up Harald's fallen banner, the "Landwaster" (Landøyðan), and initiated a final counter-attack. Although they for a moment appeared to almost breach the English line, Eystein was suddenly killed, which left the rest of the men to flee from the battlefield. Among those left at Riccall after the battle, who were allowed to return home peacefully by the English forces, was Harald's son Olaf. Although sources state that Harald's remaining army only filled 20–25 ships on the return to Norway, it is likely that this number only accounts for the Norwegian forces. Most of the forces from Scotland and Orkney probably remained at Riccall throughout the battle (the earls Paul and Erlend Thorfinnsson are certainly known to have been stationed there the entire time), and has not been counted in the traditional figure.

Harold Godwinson's victory was short-lived, as only a few weeks later he was defeated by William the Conqueror and killed at the Battle of Hastings. The fact that Harold had to make a forced march to fight Harald Hardrada at Stamford Bridge and then move at utmost speed south to meet the Norman invasion, all in less than three weeks, is widely seen as a primary factor in William's victory at Hastings.

== Personal life ==
Harald is described by Snorri Sturluson to have been physically "larger than other men and stronger". It is said that he had light hair, a light beard, and a long "upper beard" (moustache), and that one of his eyebrows was somewhat higher situated than the other. He also reportedly had big hands and feet, and could measure five ells in height. It is not known whether Snorri's description of Harald's physical appearance actually represents historical facts. The tall stature of Harald is also substantiated by a story that relates that before the Battle of Stamford Bridge, Harold Godwinson offered Tostig back the earldom of Northumbria, and Harald "six feet of the ground of England, or perhaps more seeing that he is taller than most men" (according to Henry of Huntingdon) or "six feet of English ground, or seven feet as he was taller than other men" (according to Snorri Sturluson).

Harald himself composed skaldic poetry. According to Lee M. Hollander, composing poetry was normal for Norwegian kings, but Harald was the only one who "showed a decided talent." His preoccupation with the poetic form may have motivated him to give privileged attention to Icelanders, and particularly Icelandic skalds. He is portrayed as a man very concerned with the way that his image will be presented and memory shaped. According to one poem, Harald had mastered a number of activities that were considered sports in the Viking Age, in addition to poetry, brewing, horse riding, swimming, skiing, shooting, rowing and playing the harp. The sagas state that Harald and his Varangians at least once took a break during the siege of a town to enjoy sports.

=== Religion ===
With regards to religion, Harald had, according to DeVries, a "religious inclination towards Christianity" and was "publicly close to the Christian Church", although he was influenced by the Eastern Christian culture of Kievan Rus' (Garderike) and the Byzantine Empire, having spent most of his life there. He was clearly interested in advancing Christianity in Norway, which can be seen by the continued building and improvement of churches throughout his reign. Despite this, DeVries notes that Harald's "personal morality appears not to have matched the Christian ideal", citing his marriage arrangements.

Harald used the Raven banner, originally a symbol of Odin, who was often depicted accompanied by two ravens named Huginn and Muninn.

== Issue ==
Harald married Elisiv of Kiev (c. 1025 – after 1066) around 1044/45, and they had an unknown number, possibly several children. According to Snorri Sturluson, they had two daughters:

- Ingegerd (c. 1050 – c. 1120). Married first to the future Olaf I of Denmark, and after his death, to the future Philip of Sweden of the House of Stenkil
- Maria (died 25 September 1066). Promised away for marriage to Eystein Orre (brother of Tora Torbergsdatter), but reportedly died on Orkney the same day that Harald (and Eystein) died at Stamford Bridge.

According to the sagas, Harald married Tora Torbergsdatter (c. 1025 – after 1066) around 1048. Some modern historians have disputed this, since Harald in that case would be in a bigamous marriage, as he was still married to Elisiv. It is nonetheless possible that such a marriage could take place in Norway in the 11th century, and although Harald had two wives, only Elisiv is noted to have held the title of Queen. Harald and Tora had at least two children:

- Magnus II (c. 1049 – c. 1069). Reigned as king of Norway from 1066 to 1069.
- Olaf III (c. 1050 – c. 1093). Reigned as king of Norway from 1067 to 1093.

== Legacy ==
=== Burial ===
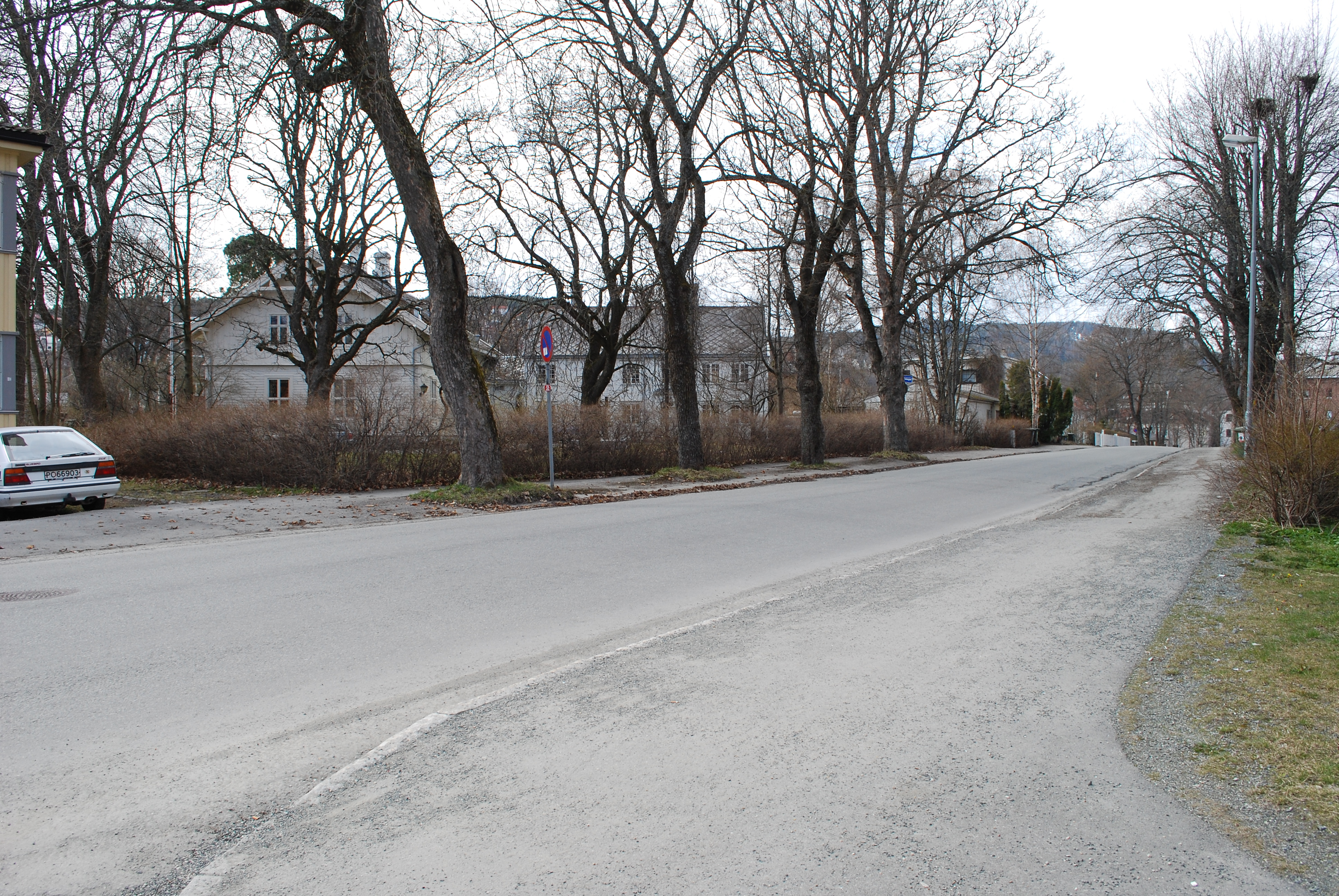
The present Klostergata in Trondheim, site of the former Helgeseter Priory

A year after his death at Stamford Bridge, Harald's body was moved to Norway and buried at the Mary Church in Nidaros (Trondheim). About a hundred years after his burial, his body was reinterred at the Helgeseter Priory, which was demolished in the 17th century. On 25 September 2006, the 940th anniversary of Harald's death, the newspaper Aftenposten published an article on the poor state of Norway's ancient royal burial sites, including that of Harald, which is reportedly located underneath a road built across the monastery site. In a follow-up article on 26 September, the Municipality of Trondheim revealed they would be examining the possibility of exhuming the king and reinterring him in Nidaros Cathedral, currently the burial place of nine Norwegian kings, among them Magnus the Good and Magnus Haraldsson, Harald's predecessor and successor respectively. A month later it was reported that the proposal to exhume the king had been scrapped.

=== Modern memorials ===
Two monuments have been erected in honour of Harald in Oslo, the city which he is traditionally held to have founded. A bronze relief on granite by Lars Utne depicting Harald on horseback was raised on the eponymously named square Harald Hardrådes plass in 1905. In 1950, a large relief by Anne Grimdalen, also of Harald on horseback, was unveiled on the western façade of the Oslo City Hall.

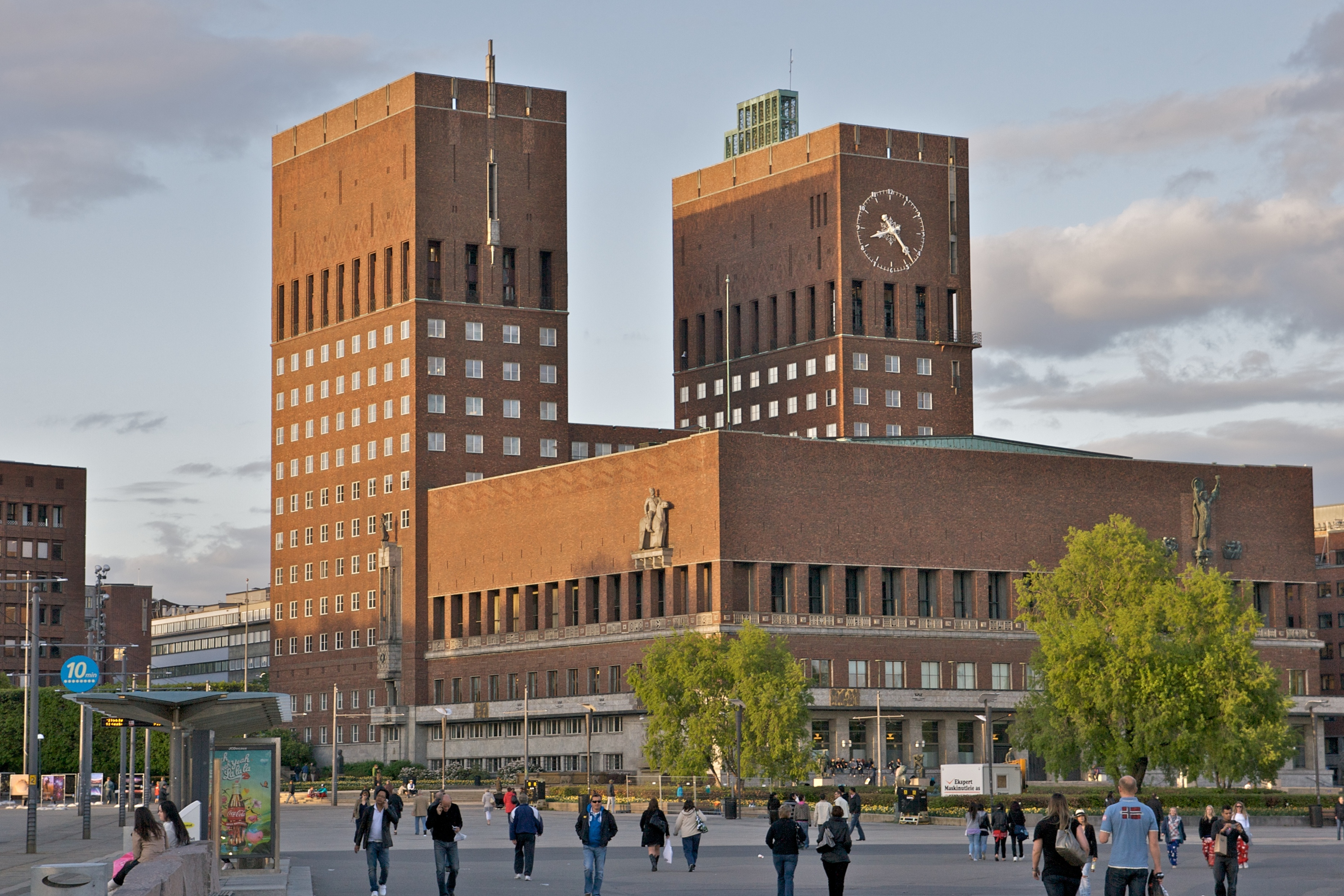
Oslo City Hall (centre of image) with relief depicting Harald on the western façade

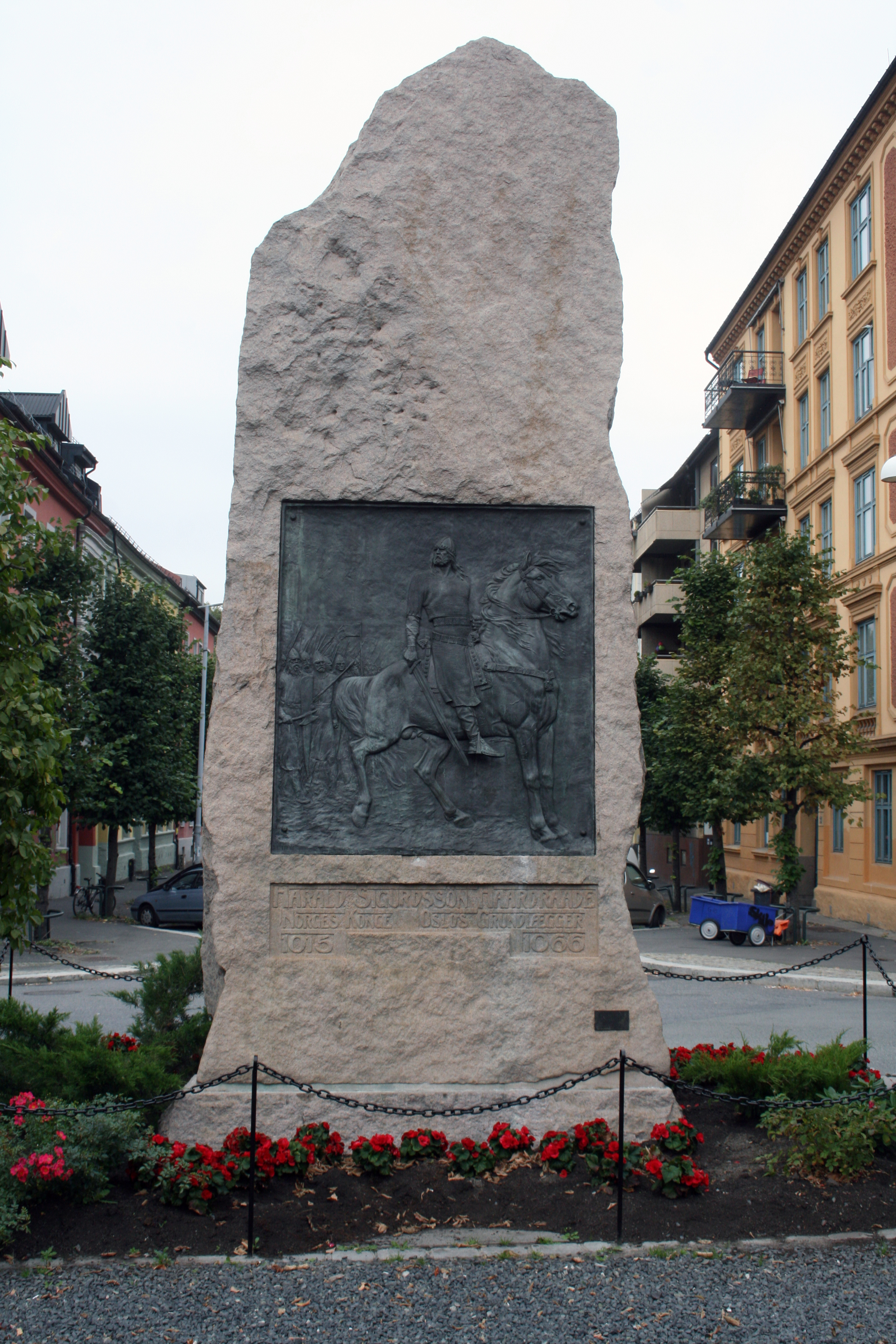
Monument to Harald at Harald Hardrådes plass in Gamlebyen

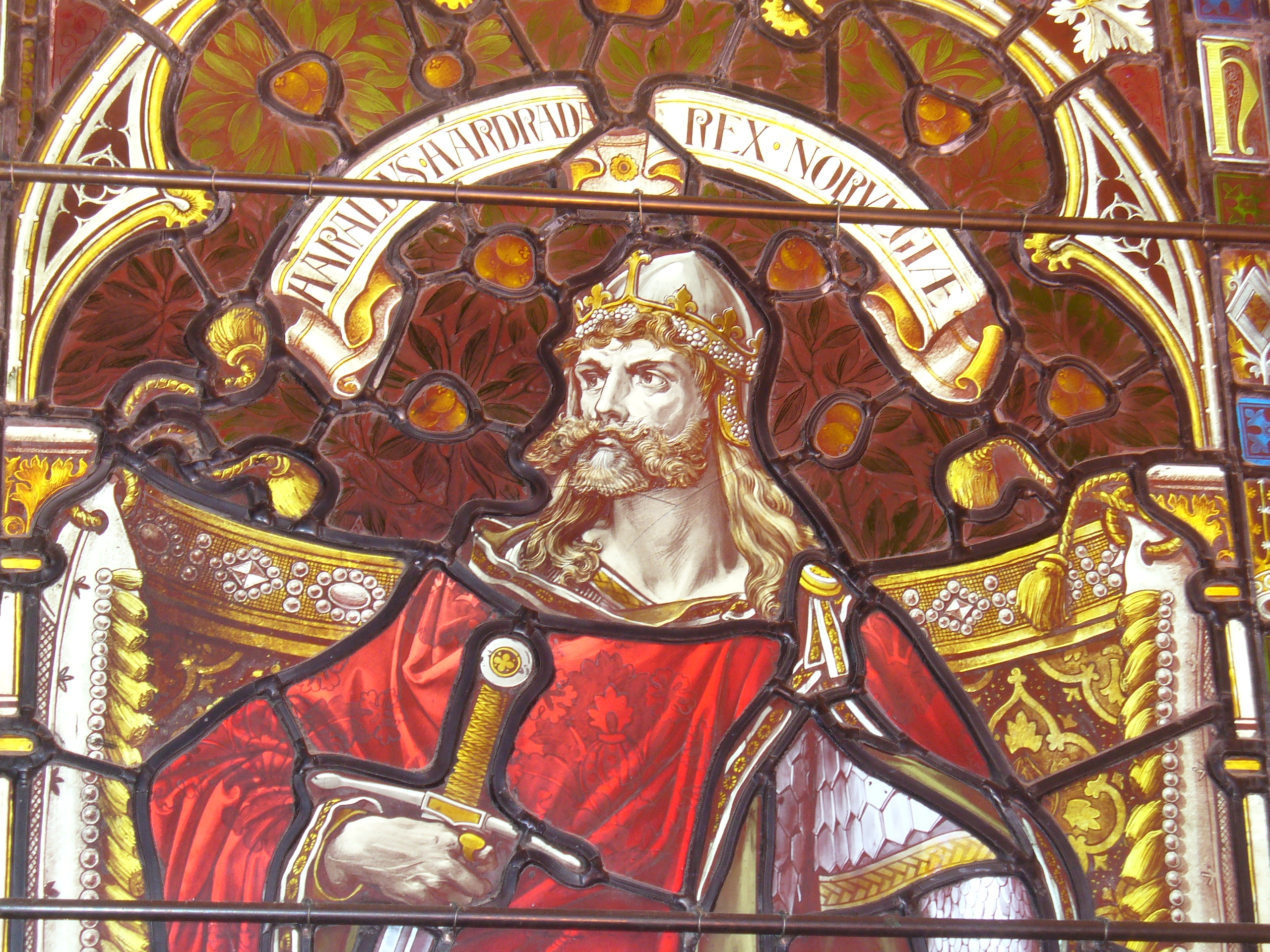
Window with portrait of Harald in Lerwick Town Hall, Shetland

=== Literature ===
Poul Anderson's historical-fiction trilogy The Last Viking is a fictionalised account of Harald's life.

== Citations ==
=== Sources ===
- Bandlien, Bjørn (2022). "When Worldviews Collide?: The Travel Narratives of Haraldr Sigurdarson of Norway" In Raffensperger, C. (Ed.) Authorship, Worldview, and Identity in Medieval Europe (1st ed.), 38–59. Routledge. ISBN 9781003025160.
- Barlow, Frank (1970). Edward the Confessor. University of California. ISBN 978-0520016712.
- Beeler, John (1971). Warfare in Feudal Europe: 730–1200. Cornell University. ISBN 978-0-8014-9120-7.
- Bibikov, Mikhail (2004). "Byzantine Sources for the History of Balticum and Scandinavia". In Volt, Ivo; Päll, Janika (eds.). Byzanto-Nordica. Tartu, Estonia: Tartu University. ISBN 9949-11-266-4.
- Blöndal, Sigfús (2007). Benedikz, Benedikt S. (ed.). The Varangians of Byzantium. Cambridge University. ISBN 978-0-521-21745-3.
- Chisholm, Hugh, ed. (1911). "Harald" . Encyclopædia Britannica (11th ed.). Cambridge University Press.
- DeVries, Kelly (1999). The Norwegian Invasion of England in 1066. Boydell & Brewer Ltd. ISBN 978-0-85115-763-4.
- DeVries, Kelly (2001). Harold Godwinson in Wales: Military Legitimacy in Late Anglo-Saxon England in The Normans and their Adversaries at War: Essays in Memory of C. Warren Hollister (Warfare in History). Boydell Press. ISBN 978-0851158471.
- Gravett, Christopher; Nicolle, David (2007). The Normans: Warrior Knights and Their Castles. Osprey. ISBN 978-1-84603-218-9.
- Henriksen, Vera (2011). Dronningsagaen; Kongespeil [Queen's Day; King's Mirror] (in Norwegian). Aschehoug. ISBN 978-8203350788. Archived from the original on 20 October 2019.
- Hjardar, Kim; Vike, Vegard (2011). Vikinger i krig (in Norwegian). Spartacus. ISBN 978-82-430-0475-7.
- Jakobsson, Sverrir (2008). "The Schism that never was: Old Norse views on Byzantium and Russia". Byzantinoslavica. Slovanský ústav Akademie věd ČR, v. v. i. and Euroslavica. pp. 173–188.
- Moseng, Ole Georg; et al. (1999). Norsk historie: 750–1537 (in Norwegian). Vol. I. Aschehoug. ISBN 978-82-518-3739-2.
- Schive, C. I. (1865). Norges Mynter i Middelalderen (in Norwegian). Christiania: H. Tønsberg.
- Skaare, Kolbjørn (1995). Norges mynthistorie: mynter og utmyntning i 1000 år, pengesedler i 300 år, numismatikk i Norge (in Norwegian). Vol. 1. Universitetsforlaget. ISBN 82-00-22666-2.
- Stenton, F. M. (1971). Anglo-Saxon England. Oxford History of England. Vol. II (3rd ed.). Oxford: Clarendon Press-Oxford University Press. ISBN 978-0-19-821716-9.
- Thunberg, Carl L. (2012). Att tolka Svitjod [To interpret Svitjod] (in Swedish). Göteborgs universitet, CLTS. ISBN 978-91-981859-4-2.
- Tjønn, Halvor (2010). Harald Hardråde. Sagakongene (in Norwegian). Saga Bok/Spartacus. ISBN 978-82-430-0558-7.

Harald Hardrada House of Hardrada Cadet branch of the Fairhair dynasty Born: c. 1015 Died: 25 September 1066
Regnal titles
| Preceded by Magnus I | King of Norway; 1046–1066 with Magnus I (1046–1047) | Succeeded by Magnus II |
