= Ingerid of Denmark =

Queen of Norway from 1067 to 1093

Queen consort of Norway
- Tenure: 1067–1093
- Died: After 1093
- Spouse: Olaf III of Norway; Svein Brynjulfsson
- Issue: Hallkatla Sveinsdotter
- House: Estridsen
- Father: Sweyn II of Denmark

Ingerid Swendsdatter of Denmark (also spelt Ingrid; 11th century – after 1093) was a Danish princess who became Queen of Norway as the spouse of King Olaf III of Norway.

Ingerid Swensdatter was the daughter of King Sweyn II of Denmark. It is not known which one of her father's wives and concubines was the mother of Ingerid.

She seems to have retired to private life as a widow and there is nothing to indicate that she played any political part after the death of her spouse.

== Ancestry ==
Ancestors of Ingerid of Denmark

16. Björn
8. Thorgil Sprakling
4. Ulf Thorgilsson
2. Sweyn II of Denmark
20. Harald Bluetooth
10. Sweyn I Forkbeard
5. Estrid Svendsdatter
11. Sigrid the Haughty (legendary)
1. Ingerid of Denmark

== Notes ==
Norwegian royalty
Preceded by Elisiv of Kiev	Queen consort of Norway; 1067–1093	Succeeded by Margaret Fredkulla
