= Ingegerd of Norway =

Queen of Denmark (1086–1095) and Sweden (1105–1118)

Ingegerd Haraldsdotter

Queen consort of Denmark
- Tenure: 1086–1095

Queen consort of Sweden
- Tenure: 1105–1118
- Born: c. 1046
- Died: c. 1120 (aged 73–74)
- Spouse: Olaf I of Denmark; Philip of Sweden
- Dynasty: Hardrada
- Father: Harald Hardrada
- Mother: Elisiv of Kiev

Ingegerd Haraldsdotter (Old Norse: Ingigerðr Haraldsdóttir; c. 1046 – c. 1120) was a Norwegian princess who, by her successive marriages, became queen of Denmark and Sweden. Her husbands were Olaf I of Denmark (died 1095) and Philip of Sweden (died 1118).

== Biography ==
Ingegerd Haraldsdotter was the daughter of King Harald Hardrada of Norway and Elisiv of Kiev and thereby the great-granddaughter of King Olof Skötkonung of Sweden and the granddaughter of Yaroslav the Wise, Grand Prince of Kiev. She was first married to Olaf I of Denmark, in approximately 1067, in a marriage arranged as a part of the peace treaty between Denmark and Norway; to further strengthen the alliance, Olof's half-sister, Ingerid, married King Olav Kyrre, who was the brother of Queen Ingegerd. Ingegerd became queen of Denmark when Olof became king in 1086.

After his death in 1095, the queen dowager traveled to Sweden, where she married King Inge the Elder's nephew Philip in 1095 or 1096. He became king in 1105, making her queen a second time. There is no known issue from the second marriage. She was widowed in 1118. The years of her birth and death are not confirmed, but she is known to have survived her second spouse.

== Sources ==
- Lars O. Lagerqvist (1982). Sverige och dess regenter under 1.000 år(Sweden and its rulers during 1000 years) (in Swedish). Albert Bonniers Förlag AB. ISBN 91-0-075007-7.

Ingegerd Haraldsdotter House of Hardrada Born: 1046 Died: 1120
Royal titles
Preceded by Adela of Flanders	Queen consort of Denmark; 1086–1095	Succeeded by Boedil Thurgotsdatter
Preceded by Helena	Queen consort of Sweden; 1105–1118	Succeeded by Ragnhild
