= Olaf III of Norway =

King of Norway from 1067 to 1093

Olaf III
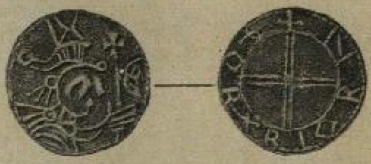
- Coin dating to the reign of King Olaf Kyrre.

King of Norway
- Reign: 1067 – 22 September 1093
- Predecessor: Magnus II
- Successor: Magnus III, Haakon Magnusson
- Co-ruler: Magnus II (until 1069)
- Born: c. 1050
- Died: 22 September 1093 (aged about 43); Haukbø, Rånrike, Norway (now Håkeby, Tanum, Sweden)
- Burial: Nidaros Cathedral
- Consort: Ingerid of Denmark
- Issue: Magnus III of Norway
Names
- Óláfr Haraldsson
- House: Hardrada
- Father: Harald III of Norway
- Mother: Tora Torbergsdatter

Olaf III or Olaf Haraldsson (Old Norse: Óláfr Haraldsson, Norwegian: Olav Haraldsson; c. 1050 – 22 September 1093), known as Olaf the Peaceful (Old Norse: Óláfr kyrri, Norwegian: Olav Kyrre), was King of Norway from 1067 until his death in 1093.

He was present at the Battle of Stamford Bridge in England in 1066 where his father, King Harald Hardrada, saw defeat and was killed in action, an event that directly preceded his kingship. During his rule, Olaf made peace with regard to earlier royal conflicts with the church, strengthened the power of the monarchy, and is traditionally credited with founding the city of Bergen circa 1070. Around 1225, Snorri Sturluson wrote Olav Kyrres saga about King Olaf in the Heimskringla.

== Biography ==
Olaf was a son of King Harald Hardrada and Tora Torbergsdatter. Olaf joined his father during the invasion of England during 1066. However, he was only 16 years old during the Battle of Stamford Bridge on 25 September 1066. He stayed guarding the ships at Riccall and did not participate in the fighting. After the Norwegian defeat, he sailed with the remains of the Norwegian strike force back to Orkney, where they wintered. The return journey to Norway took place in summer 1067.

After the death of his father, Olaf shared the kingdom with his brother Magnus II (Magnus 2 Haraldsson) who had become king the previous year. When King Magnus died during 1069, Olaf became the sole ruler of Norway.

During his reign, the nation of Norway experienced a rare extended period of peace. He renounced any offensive foreign policy, instead protecting Norway's sovereignty through agreements and marriage connections. Domestically he emphasized the church's organization and the modernization of the kingdom. The latter resulted in, among other things, the reorganization of the body-guard and of measures under which key cities, especially Bergen, could better serve as a royal residence. According to the Heimskringla by Snorri Sturluson, Olaf is said to have founded the city of Bergen (originally called Bjørgvin).

The death of Harald Hardrada and the serious defeat suffered by the Norwegians in 1066 tempted the Danish king, Svend Estridsen, to prepare for an attack on Norway. King Svend no longer felt bound by the ceasefire agreement signed with Harald Hardrada in 1064, since it would only be valid for the two kings during their own lives. However Olaf made peace with King Svend and married the king's daughter Ingerid. Later, Olav's half sister Ingegerd married King Svend's son Olaf. Although there were some attacks on England by Danish forces, peace persisted between Denmark and Norway. Olaf also made peace with William the Conqueror of England.

King Olaf broke with his father's line in his relationship to the church. Harald Hardrada had developed a continuing conflict with the Archbishopric of Bremen due to the archbishop's authority over the Norwegian church. Unlike his father, Olav recognized that authority fully. Political considerations may have been behind this conciliatory attitude, as may have been Olaf's concern with the church organization. Until his time bishops had formed part of the king's court and traveled with him around the country to take care of the ecclesiastical affairs while the king took care of worldly matters. The bishops established fixed residence in Oslo, Nidaros and Bergen. King Olaf also took the initiative for the construction of churches, including Christ Church in Bergen and Nidaros Cathedral in Trondheim.

Olaf strengthened the power of the king and instituted the system of guilds in Norway. There are strong indications that the government of King Olaf began writing secure provincial laws to a greater extent. The Norwegian law Gulatingsloven was probably put in writing for the first time during his reign.

King Olaf died of illness on 22 September 1093 in Haukbø, Rånrike, then part of Norway (now Håkeby, Tanum Municipality, Sweden). He was buried at the Nidaros Cathedral. His marriage to Ingerid did not produce any children. His successor as king, Magnus III nicknamed Magnus Barefoot (Magnus Berrføtt), was acknowledged to be his illegitimate son.

== Appearance and character ==
The Morkinskinna (c. 1220) describes Olaf III as:

- "[A] tall man, and everyone agrees that there has never been seen a fairer man or a man of nobler appearance."
- "He had blond hair, a light complexion, and pleasing eyes, and he was well proportioned. He was taciturn for the most part, and not much of a speechmaker, though he was good company after drink."

Another description is found in the Heimskringla of Snorri Sturluson:

- "Olaf was a stout man, well grown in limbs; and every one said a handsomer man could not be seen, nor of a nobler appearance."
- "His hair was yellow as silk, and became him well; his skin was white and fine over all his body; his eyes beautiful, and his limbs well proportioned. He was rather silent in general, and did not speak much even at Things; but he was merry in drinking parties. He loved drinking much, and was talkative enough then; but quite peaceful."
- "He was cheerful in conversation, peacefully inclined during all his reign, and loving gentleness and moderation in all things."

== Memorial ==
A memorial to King Olaf Kyrre was placed in Bergen, Norway in connection with the city's 900-year anniversary. The abstract equestrian statue by noted Norwegian sculptor Knut Steen was unveiled on 21 May 1998.

== The "Maine penny" ==
The Maine penny - a Norwegian silver coin discovered in the US State of Maine in 1957 and suggested as evidence of Pre-Columbian trans-oceanic contact - has been dated to the time of Olaf III. The circumstances of its arrival from Norway to a Native American village in the present US territory remain unclear and highly disputed.

== See also ==
- List of Norwegian monarchs

Olaf Kyrre House of Hardrada Cadet branch of the Fairhair dynasty Born: c. 1050 Died: 22 September 1093
Regnal titles
Preceded by Magnus II	King of Norway; 1067–1093 with Magnus II (1067–1069)	Succeeded by Magnus III & Haakon Magnusson
