= Battle of Stamford Bridge =

1066 battle in England

- Part of the Viking invasions of England
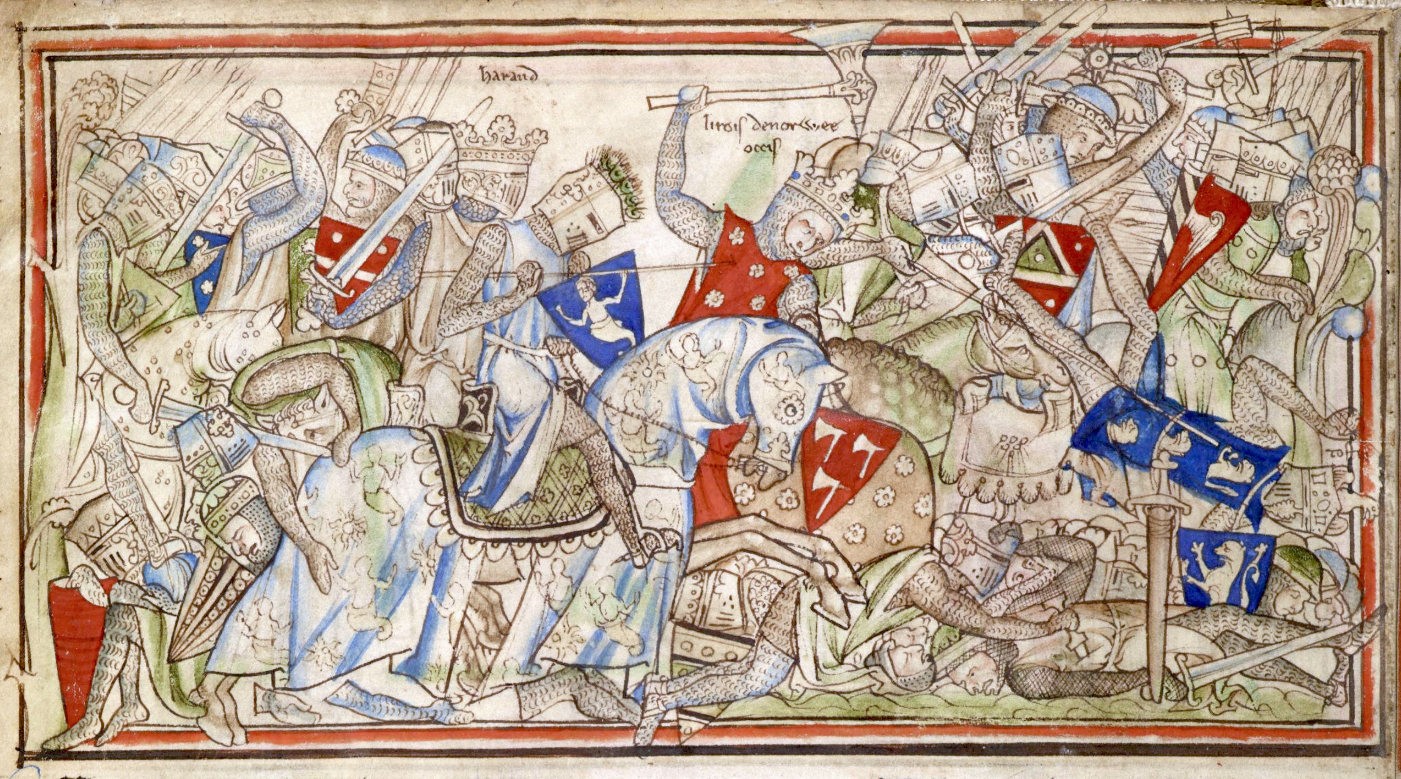
Date	25 September 1066 (Monday)
Location	Stamford Bridge, East Riding of Yorkshire, England 53°59′33″N 00°54′45″W
Result	English victory

Belligerents
Kingdom of England	Kingdom of Norway; Earldom of Orkney; English rebels

Commanders and leaders
Harold Godwinson; Morcar, Earl of Northumbria; Edwin, Earl of Mercia	Harald Hardrada †; Tostig Godwinson †; Eystein Orre †

Strength
10,500–15,000	9,000–11,000 (of which 3,000 engaged late in battle); 300 transport ships

Casualties and losses
Unknown	6,000–8,000+ dead or missing
- Location within England

The Battle of Stamford Bridge took place at the village of Stamford Bridge, East Riding of Yorkshire, in England, on 25 September 1066, between an English army under King Harold Godwinson and an invading Norwegian force led by King Harald Hardrada and the English king's brother Tostig Godwinson. After a bloody battle, both Hardrada and Tostig, along with most of the Norwegians, were killed. Although Harold Godwinson repelled the Norwegian invaders, his army was defeated by the Normans at Hastings less than three weeks later.

The battle has traditionally been presented as marking the end of the Viking Age, although major Scandinavian campaigns in Britain and Ireland occurred in the following decades, such as those of King Sweyn Estridsen of Denmark in 1069–1070 and King Magnus Barefoot of Norway in 1098 and 1102–1103.

== Background ==
The death of the childless King Edward the Confessor of England in January 1066 had triggered a succession struggle in which a variety of contenders from across Northwestern Europe fought for the English throne. These claimants included King Harald Hardrada of Norway. According to the Anglo-Saxon Chronicle Manuscript D, the Norwegians assembled a fleet of 300 ships to invade England. The authors, however, did not seem to differentiate between warships and supply ships. In King Harald's Saga, Snorri Sturluson states, "It is said that King Harald had over two hundred ships, apart from supply ships and smaller craft." Combined with reinforcements picked up in Orkney, the Norwegian army most likely numbered between 7,000 and 9,000 men. Arriving off the English coast in September, King Hardrada was joined by further forces recruited in Flanders and Scotland by Tostig Godwinson. Tostig was at odds with his elder brother Harold (who had been elected king by the Witenagemot on the death of King Edward). Having been ousted from his position as Earl of Northumbria and exiled in 1065, Tostig had mounted a series of abortive attacks on England in the spring of 1066.

In the late summer of 1066, the invaders sailed up the Ouse before advancing on York. On 20 September they defeated a northern English army led by Edwin, Earl of Mercia, and his brother Morcar, Earl of Northumbria, at the Battle of Fulford, outside York. Following this victory they received the surrender of York. Having briefly occupied the city and taken hostages and supplies from the city, they returned towards their ships at Riccall. They offered peace to the Northumbrians in exchange for their support for Hardrada's bid for the throne, and demanded further hostages from the whole of Yorkshire.

At this time King Harold was in Southern England, anticipating an invasion from France by Duke William of Normandy, another contender for the English throne. Learning of the Norwegian invasion, King Harold headed north at great speed with his housecarls and as many thegns as he could gather, travelling day and night. He made the journey from London to Yorkshire, a distance of about 185 miles (298 km), in only four days, enabling him to take the Norwegians completely by surprise. Having learned that the Northumbrians had been ordered to send the additional hostages and supplies to the Norwegians at Stamford Bridge, King Harold hurried on through York to attack them at this rendezvous on 25 September. Until the English army came into view, the invaders remained unaware of the presence of a hostile army anywhere in the vicinity.

== Location ==
Manuscripts C, D and E of the Anglo-Saxon Chronicle all mention Stamford Bridge by name. Manuscript C contains a passage which states, "Then Harold, king of the English, came upon them beyond the bridge by surprise; and there they joined battle and were fighting very hard long in the day." Though often interpreted to mean the main battle took place east of the Derwent River after the English army had crossed the bridge, Charles Plummer explains that the phrase "beyond the bridge" must be viewed "from the point of view of the enemy. To the English coming from York, they [the Norwegians] would be on the hither [near] side of the bridge." According to Henry of Huntingdon, after many "fearful assaults on both sides," the English superiority in numbers forced the Norwegians "to give way but not to flee. Driven back beyond the river, the living crossing over the dead, they resisted stoutheartedly." Like the Chronicle account, Henry's description suggests the main battle may have been fought west of the bridge.

In 2020 Simon Richardson and John Benfield, metal detectorists, and the Battle of Stamford Bridge Heritage Society, located Viking military artifacts on the banks of the River Derwent, about a mile south of Stamford Bridge and near the village of Low Catton on the east side of the river. Since no similar archeological remains have been discovered near Stamford Bridge itself, they believe that these finds come from the battlefield of 1066. A documentary on the new finds, titled "1066: The Lost Battlefield", fronted by historian and television presenter Dan Snow, was released in September 2026.

== Battle ==
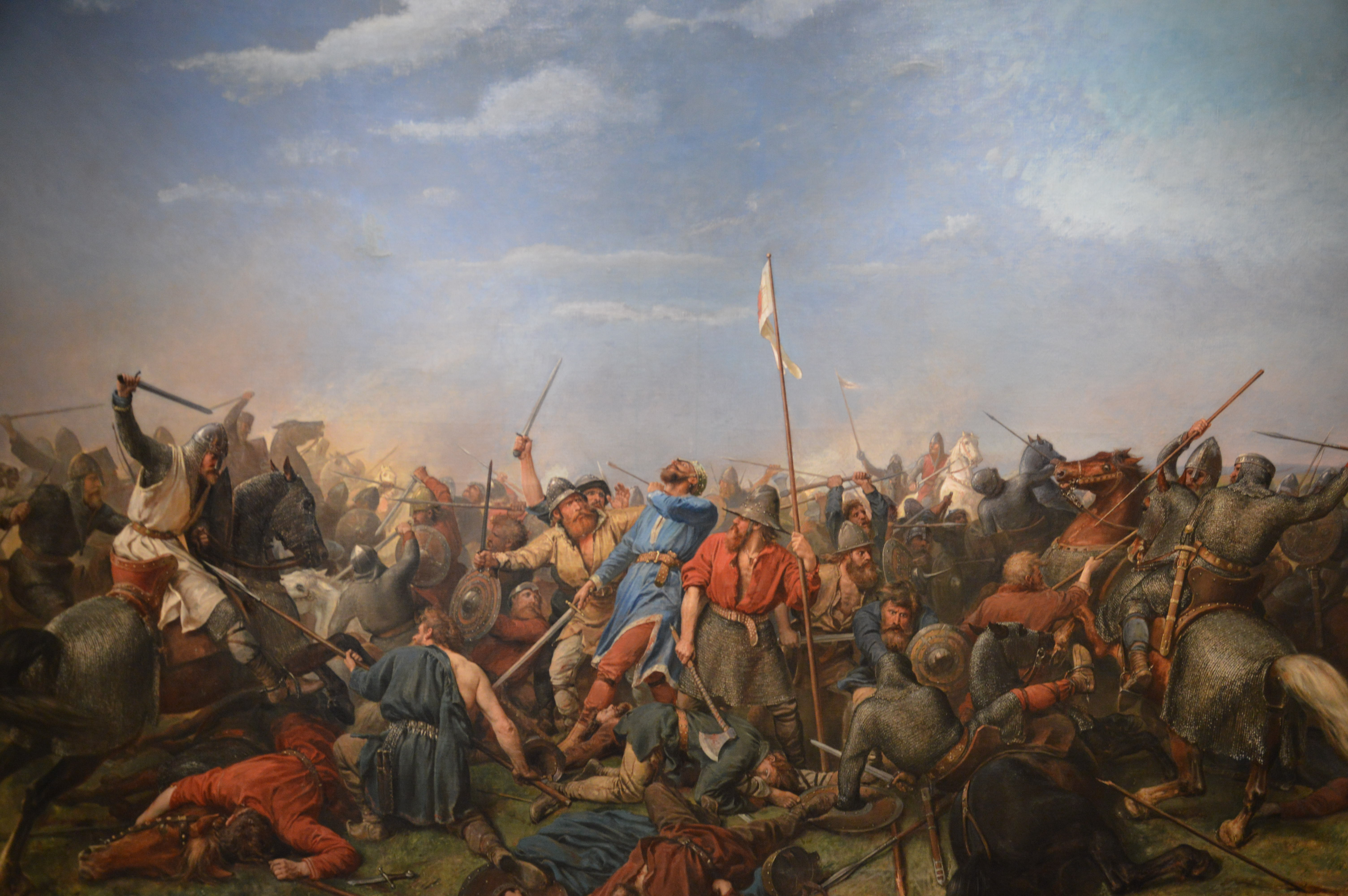
Battle of Stamford Bridge, 1870, by Peter Nicolai Arbo

According to Sturluson's King Harald's Saga, a lone rider approached King Hardrada and Tostig shortly before the battle. The rider, who did not give his name, offered Tostig the restoration of his earldom if he would abandon King Hardrada and rejoin his brother, King Harold Godwinson of England. When Tostig asked what King Harold would offer King Hardrada in return, the rider replied that King Hardrada would receive "six feet of ground, or as much more as he needs, as he is taller than most men," meaning a grave in English soil. King Hardrada, impressed by the boldness of the envoy, asked Tostig who the rider was, and Tostig identified him as King Harold Godwinson himself.

The sudden appearance of the English army caught the Norwegians by surprise. The English advance was then delayed by the need to pass through the choke-point presented by the bridge itself. The Anglo-Saxon Chronicle and the Chronicle of Henry of Huntingdon has it that one of the Norwegians, armed with an axe, blocked the narrow crossing and single-handedly held up the entire English army. This Norwegian alone cut down more than 40 Englishmen and was defeated only when an English soldier floated under the bridge and thrust his spear through the planks in the bridge and under the warrior's mail shirt.

This delay had allowed the bulk of the Norse army to form a shield wall to face the English attack. King Harold's army poured across the bridge, forming a line just short of the Norse army, locked shields and charged. The battle went far beyond the bridge itself, and although it raged for hours, the Norse army's decision to leave their armour behind left them at a distinct disadvantage. Eventually, the Norse army began to fragment and fracture, allowing the English troops to force their way in and break up the Scandinavians' shield wall. Completely outflanked, and with King Hardrada killed with an arrow to his windpipe and Tostig slain, the Norwegian army disintegrated and was virtually annihilated.

In the later stages of the battle, the Norwegians were reinforced by troops led by Eystein Orre, King Hardrada's prospective son-in-law. They had been some 16 miles (26 km) to the south, guarding the ships at Riccall, to the west of the River Derwent on the River Ouse. They had run all the way, fully armed for battle, and some of Orre's men were said to have collapsed and died of exhaustion upon reaching the battlefield. Their counter-attack, described in the Norwegian tradition as "Orre's Storm," briefly checked the English advance, but was soon overwhelmed and Orre was slain. The Norwegian army were routed. As given in the Chronicles, pursued by the English army, some of the fleeing Norsemen drowned whilst crossing rivers.

So many died in an area so small that the field was said to have been still whitened with bleached bones 50 years after the battle.

== Aftermath ==
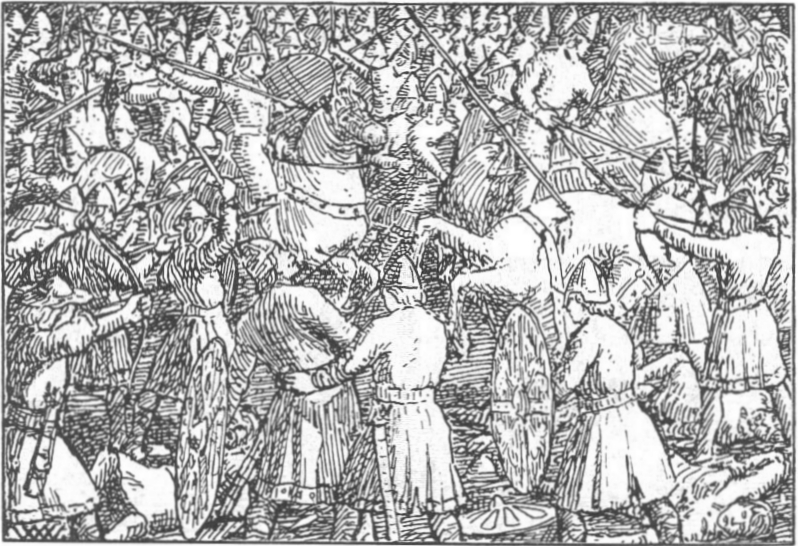
A 19th-century illustration of the Harald Hardrada saga, Heimskringla

King Harold accepted a truce with the surviving Norwegians, including King Hardrada's son Olaf and Paul Thorfinnsson, Earl of Orkney. They were allowed to leave after giving pledges not to attack England again. The losses the Norwegians had suffered were so severe that only 24 ships from the fleet of over 300 were needed to carry the survivors away. They withdrew to Orkney, where they spent the winter, and in the spring Olaf returned to Norway. After King Hardrada's death, the Norwegian kingdom was divided between Olaf and his brother Magnus, whom King Hardrada had left behind to govern in his absence. The heavy casualties suffered by both sides at Stamford Bridge were noted by later chroniclers; the English-born Norman historian Orderic Vitalis, writing decades after the event, reported that the battlefield was still "easily recognizable by the piles of bones that still bear witness to the heavy losses on both sides."

King Harold’s victory was short-lived. Three days after the battle, on 28 September 1066, a Norman invasion army led by William the Conqueror landed at Pevensey, Sussex, on the south coast of England. King Harold immediately led his troops on a forced march southwards to intercept the Norman army. On 14 October 1066, Harold, commanding an army variously estimated between 5,000 and 13,000 men, confronted William's forces at the Battle of Hastings, where he was decisively defeated and killed, allowing William to march on London and ultimately take control of all England.

== Monuments ==
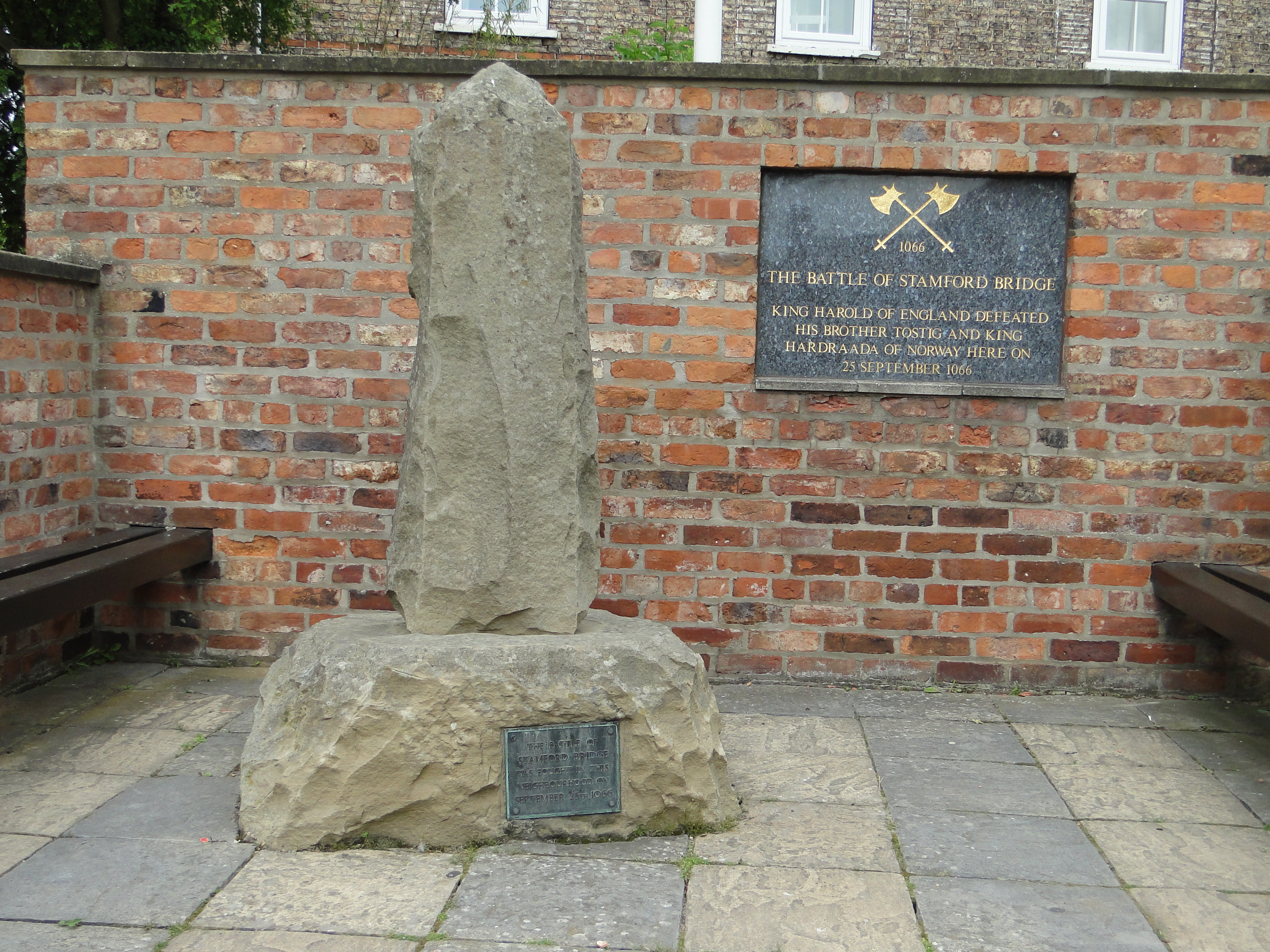
Village monument

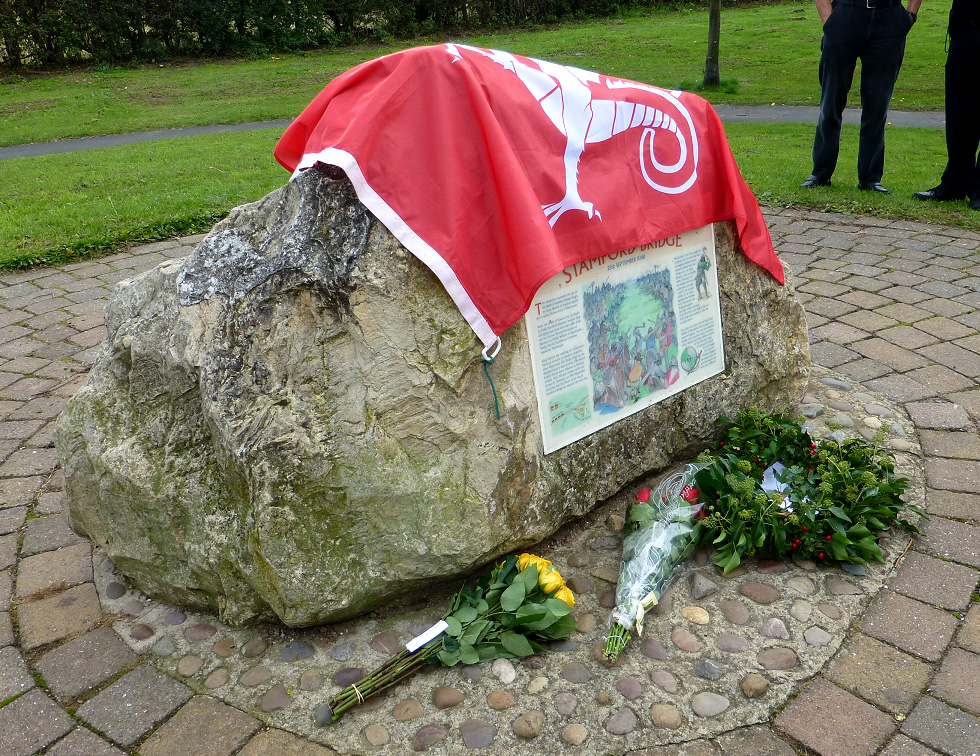
Stamford Bridge battlefield memorial near Whiterose Drive

Two monuments to the battle have been erected in and around the village of Stamford Bridge.

=== Village monument ===
The first memorial is located in the village on Main Street (A166) to the east of Church Road. The monument's inscription reads (in both English and Norwegian):

THE BATTLE OF STAMFORD BRIDGE
WAS FOUGHT IN THIS NEIGHBOURHOOD
ON SEPTEMBER 25TH, 1066

SLAGET VED STAMFORD BRU BLE UTKJEMPET I DISSE TRAKTER DEN 25. SEPTEMBER 1066

The inscription on the accompanying marble tablet reads:

THE BATTLE OF STAMFORD BRIDGE
KING HAROLD OF ENGLAND DEFEATED
HIS BROTHER TOSTIG AND KING
HARDRAADA OF NORWAY HERE ON
25 SEPTEMBER 1066

The memorial is a roadside headless cross in a brick enclosure with two wooden benches, two cast bronze plaques, and a granite panel with the inscription highlighted in gold.

=== Battlefield monument ===
A second monument is located at the battlefield site, at the end of Whiterose Drive. It has memorial stone and plaque that shows the events and the outcome of the battle.
