= History of Sweden (800–1521) =

Historical period of Sweden

Swedish pre-history ends around 800 AD, when the Viking Age begins and written sources are available. During the following centuries, Sweden gradually consolidated as a single nation. The Viking Age lasted until the mid-11th century. Scandinavia was formally Christianized by 1100 AD. The period 1050 to 1350—when the Black Death struck Europe—is considered the Older Middle Ages. The period from 1350 to 1523 is considered the Younger Middle Ages. (Note: The classification and dates are found in Harrison (2002), pp. 12–14, and Weibull (1997).) The Kalmar Union between the Scandinavian countries was established in 1397 and lasted until King Gustav Vasa ended it upon seizing power during the Swedish War of Liberation, which concluded in 1523.

== Viking Age ==
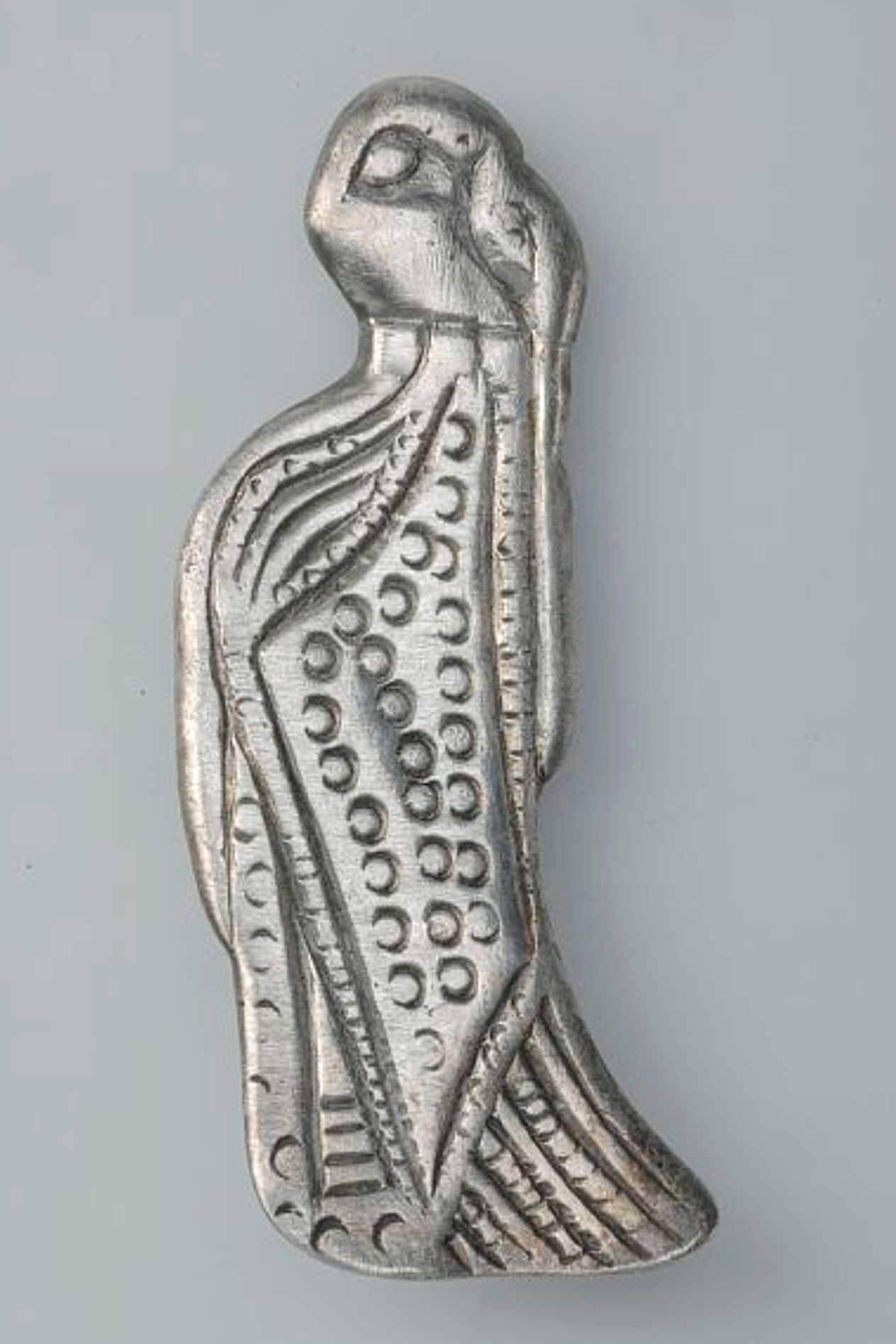
Viking age silver valkyria 800–1099.

Until the 9th century, the Scandinavian people lived in small Germanic kingdoms and chiefdoms known as petty kingdoms. These Scandinavian kingdoms and their royal rulers are mainly known from legends and scattered continental sources as well as from runestones. The Scandinavian people appeared as a group separate from other Germanic nations, and at this time there was a noticeable increase in war expeditions (Viking raids) on foreign countries, which has given the name Viking Age to this period. At this time the seas were easier to travel than Europe's inland forests, and the wild buffer regions that separated the kingdoms of the time that were known as marches.

=== Voyages to foreign countries ===
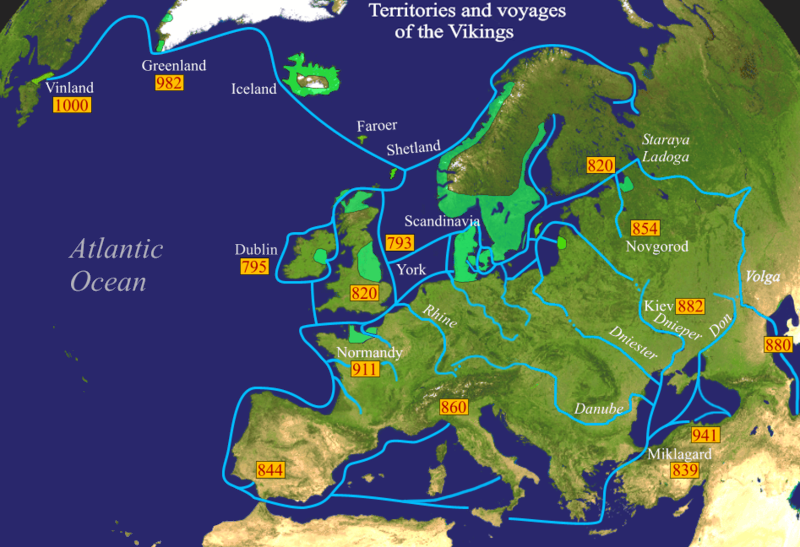
Viking expeditions (blue): Norse people, including Swedes, engaged in far-reaching voyages and raids. Swedish Vikings predominantly traveled eastward, into Russia.

The Swedes took part in many Western raids against England alongside the Danes and Norwegians of which many successfully acquired Danegeld as seen on the England Runestones. The Swedes were also very active traders and raiders in the eastern and southeastern parts of Europe. The large Russian mainland and its many navigable rivers offered good prospects for trading and plundering. These routes brought them into contact with the Byzantine and Muslim empires. The former led, among other things, to the formation of the Varangian Guard, an elite fighting force made up by Norsemen. The scholarly consensus is that the Rus' people originated in what is currently coastal eastern Sweden around the eighth century and that their name has the same origin as Roslagen in Sweden (with the older name being Roden).

During the 9th century, extensive Scandinavian settlements were made on the east side of the Baltic Sea. The Tale of Bygone Years (dated to 1113) tells of how the Varangians arrived in Constantinople, and of pirate expeditions on the Black Sea and the Caspian Sea.

The Varangians accumulated great wealth from their foreign trades. A centre of trade in northern Europe developed on the island of Birka, not far from where Stockholm was later constructed, in mid-latitude Sweden. Birka declined drastically by 960, but archaeological finds indicate it was wealthy in the 9th and 10th centuries. Thousands of graves, coins, jewelry and other luxury items have been found there.

=== Early rulers ===
Medieval Danish, Norwegian, Icelandic and Anglo-Saxon sources tell of Migration Age Swedish kings belonging to the Scylfing dynasty, also known as Ynglings. Some sources, such as Íslendingabók, Ynglinga saga and Historia Norwegiæ trace the foundation of the Swedish kingdom back to the last centuries BC. (Note: One of the earliest kings, Fjölnir was considered to have lived at the time of the Roman emperor Augustus, see Grottasöngr.) Some of these sources, the Anglo-Saxon Widsith and Beowulf, may date to the 8th century in their present forms, but retain oral traditions that are considerably older. Native Scandinavian sources are generally held to date no earlier than the 9th century in the form of skaldic poetry, such as Ynglingatal. The Scandinavian sources were not put to paper until the 11th century and later.

In a mythological sense, the first king of Sweden is said to have been Odin as the founder of the house of Yngling. (See also List of legendary kings of Sweden.)

The earliest kings whose names appear in different traditions (Beowulf and Ynglingatal) are three kings from the 6th century, starting with Ongentheow or Egil. The first kings attested in a contemporary source are those mentioned in Rimbert's Vita Ansgarii, from the 9th century.

Before the 10th or 11th century, there were many different petty kings, who ruled over different parts of the future Sweden and a lot of fighting and disputes between different tribes, such as the Geats and Swedes, and different sources contradict each other. These contradictions persists up to and after the reign of Eric the Victorious, who ruled around 970–995, but some facts about him can be established. Eric was succeeded by his son King Olof Skötkonung (late 960s – c. 1020), the first Christian king of Sweden, and the first who is known to have ruled over the different tribes. Olof is listed first in medieval Swedish regnal lists, but modern ones usually start with his father.

== Middle Ages ==
=== Christianization ===
During and before the Early Viking Age, the people in what is now Sweden were primarily believers in Norse mythology, which dominated most of southern Scandinavia. Swedes had contact with Christianity from their early travels. Christian influence on burials can be traced to the late 8th century in some parts of Sweden. Additionally, Irish missionary monks were most likely active in some parts of Sweden, as demonstrated by Irish saints that were honored in the Middle Ages. Sweden is traditionally considered to be the last country out of Sweden, Denmark and Norway to adopt Christianity and held on to their pagan beliefs the longest, with rulers such as Blot-Sweyn.

From the Holy Roman Empire, the monk Ansgar (801–865) began the earliest campaign to introduce Christianity to Sweden. Ansgar made his first visit to Birka in 829, was granted permission to build a church, and stayed as a missionary until 831. He then returned home and became Archbishop of Hamburg-Bremen. Around 850, he returned to Birka, where he saw that the previous congregation had faded away. Ansgar tried to re-establish it, but it only lasted a few years. However, archaeological digs in Varnhem found a Christian burial ground established in the late 9th century. On the same spot, a stone church was built in the early-11th century, and a short distance away, Varnhem Abbey was established in the 12th century.

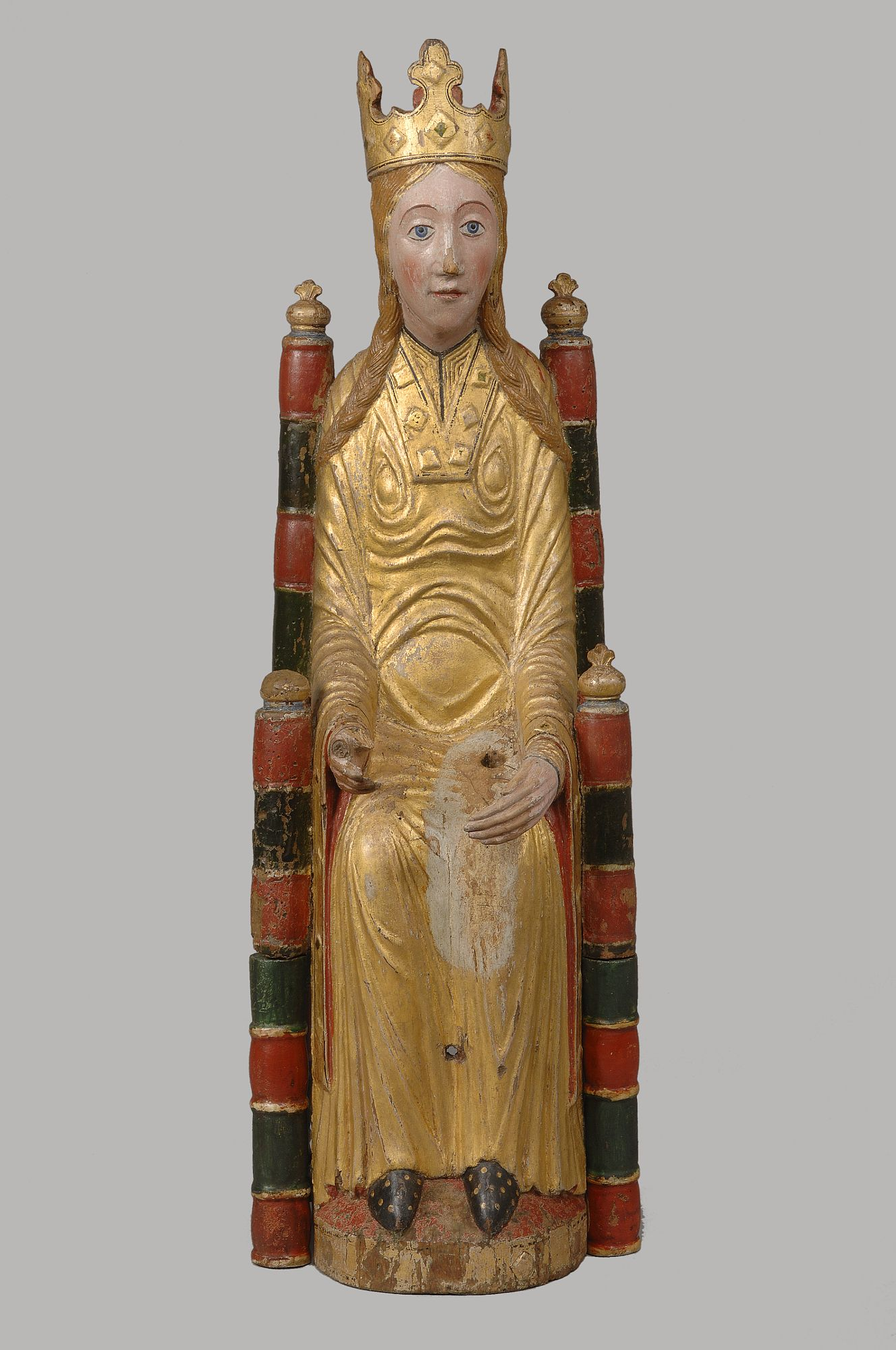
The Viklau Madonna, 12th century, Viklau Church, Gotland.

When Emund the Old ascended to the throne, around 1050, he had converted to Christianity. But because of his quarrels with Adalhard, Archbishop of Bremen, independence of the Church of Sweden was not obtained for another century. A decade later, in 1060, King Stenkil ascended to the throne. At the time, Christianity was firmly established throughout most of Sweden, with its chief strength in Västergötland. However, the people of Uppland, with their centre in Uppsala, still held to their original (heathen) faith. Adalhard had succeeded in destroying the idols in Västergötland, but was unable to persuade Stenkil to destroy the ancient Temple of Uppsala.

There are large gaps in the knowledge of the earliest Swedish regents. However, the last king who followed the old Norse religion was Blot-Sweyn, who reigned 1084–87. According to legend, Blot-Sweyn became king when his predecessor Inge refused to sacrifice at Uppsala. His brother-in-law Sweyn stepped up and agreed to sacrifice, which gave him the nickname Blot, which means sacrifice. Inge took out his revenge three years later, when he entered Uppsala with a great force, set Blot-Sweyn's house ablaze, and killed him as he attempted to flee the burning wreckage. (Note: One early source is the Hervarar saga from the 13th century.) (Note: Another important primary source is found in the legend of Saint Eskil, written a few centuries later.)

It was not until Eric the Saint (1150–60) that the Church of Sweden was to be organized on the medieval model. According to a late-13th-century legend, Erik undertook the so-called First Swedish Crusade to Finland together with the equally legendary Bishop Henry of Uppsala, conquering the country and building many churches there. No historical record remains of the alleged crusade.

After the introduction of Christianity the importance of Uppsala began to decline steadily, and the kings no longer made it their residence. It was made the seat for the Swedish Archbishop in 1164. A cathedral was built on the place for the old Temple of Uppsala. One of the first to be consecrated there was the Swedish King Eric the Saint.

=== Consolidation ===
In the 11th and 12th centuries, the sources state how Sweden more or less consisted of self-governing provinces. It is established that Olof Skötkonung was king of Svealand and at least parts of Götaland, but it is uncertain whether his realm extended to include all of it. And after Olof, the reign of the country was on several occasions divided between different rulers. King Sverker I of Sweden (1134–55) is said to have permanently integrated Götaland and Svealand.

The following centuries saw rivalry between two houses: the House of Sverker in the Östergötland province, and the House of Eric in the Västergötland province.

=== 13th century ===
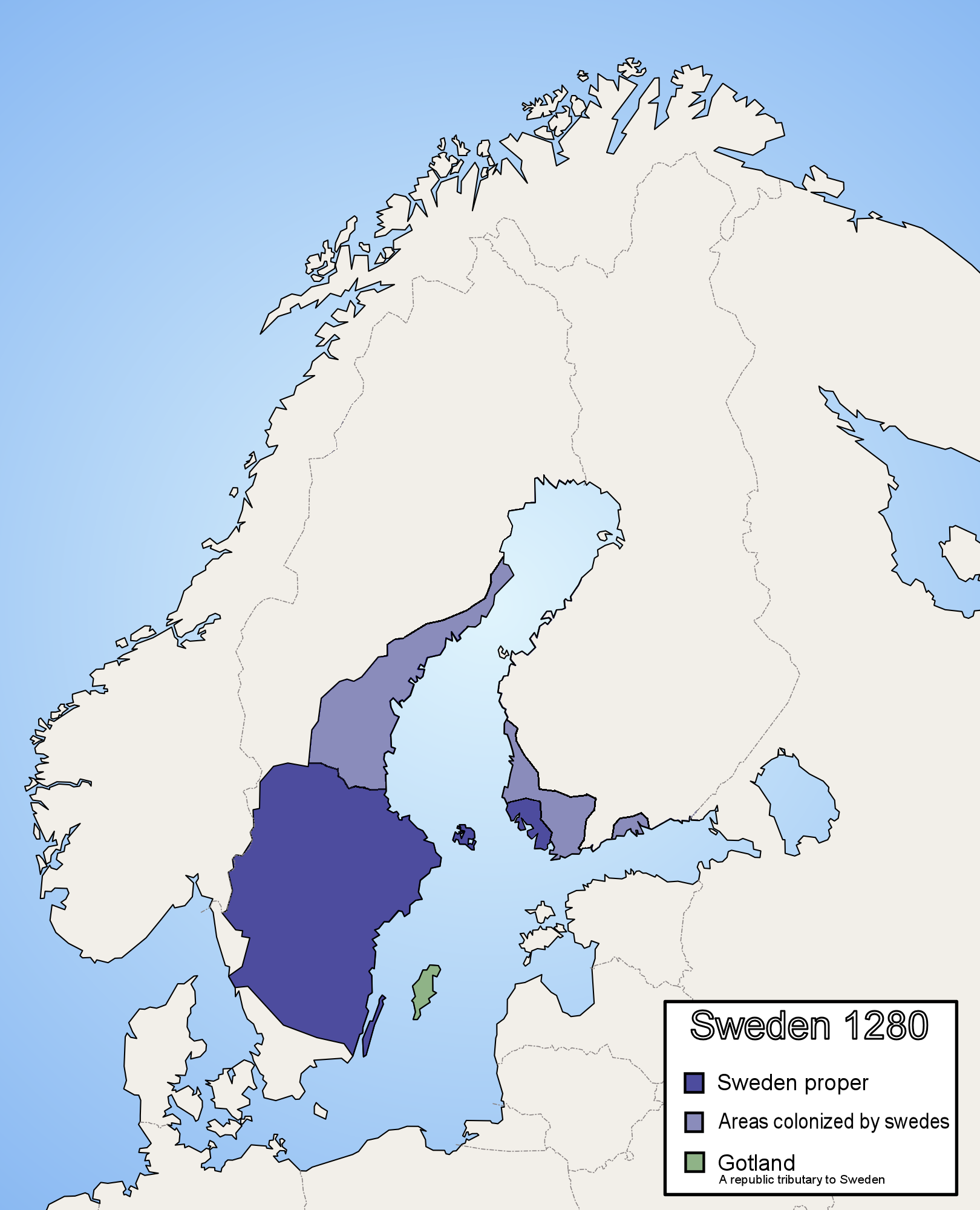
A rough map of the extent of Swedish rule, c. 1280

The greatest medieval statesman of Sweden, and one of the principal architects of its rise as a nation, Birger Jarl the Regent, practically ruled the land from 1248 to 1266. He is today revered as the founder of Stockholm and as the creator of national legislation. His reforms paved the way for the abolition of serfdom. The increased respect and power which later royals owed to Birger Jarl were further extended by his son, King Magnus Ladulås (1275–90). Both these rulers, by the institution of separate and almost independent duchies, attempted to introduce into Sweden a feudal system similar to that already established in continental Europe; the danger of thus weakening the realm by partition was averted, though not without violent and tragic complications by the opponents, the Folkung party. Finally, in 1319, the severed portions of Sweden were once more reunited.

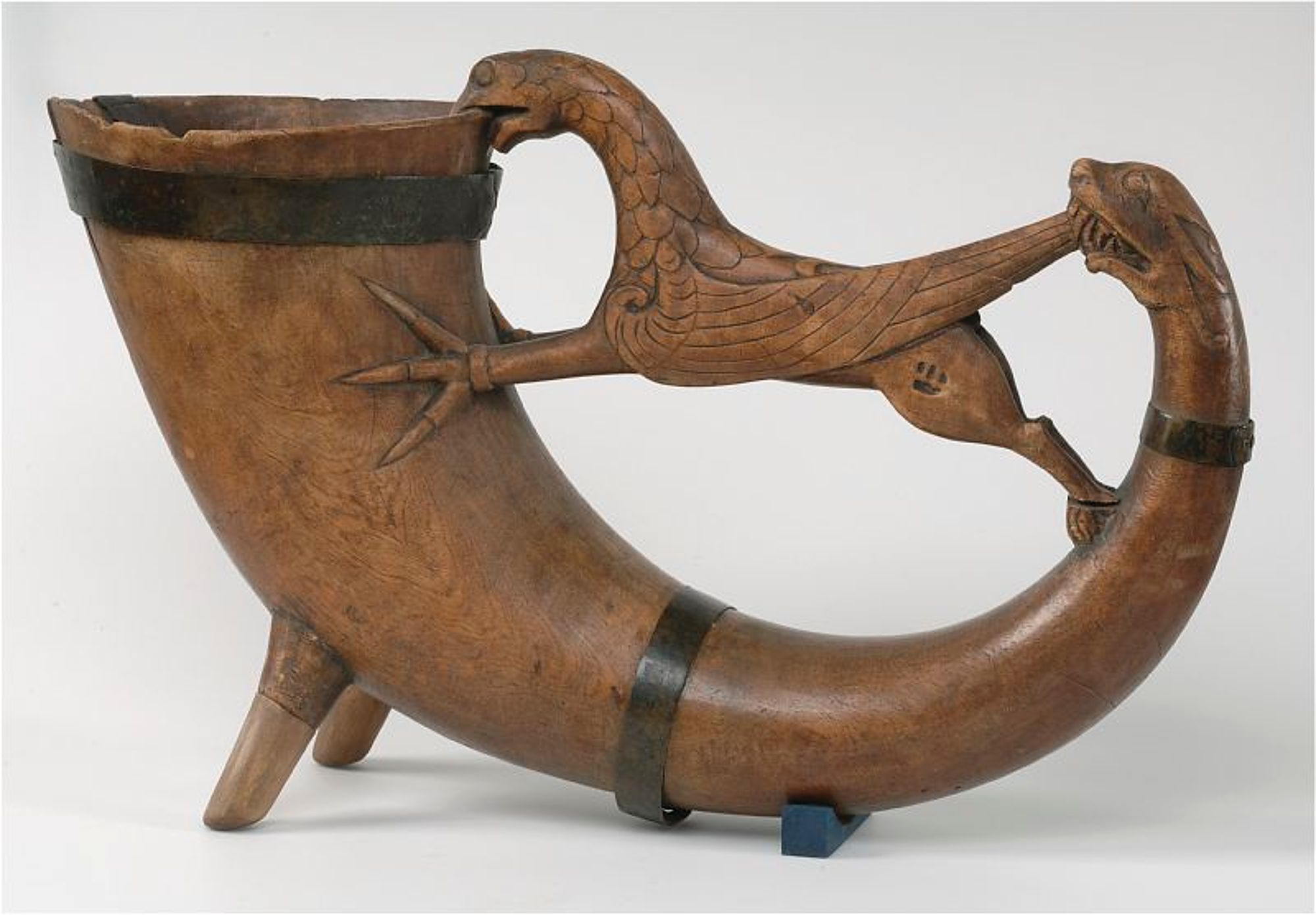
Swedish Middle Ages drinking horn.

The formation of separate orders (classes of society), or estates, was promoted by Magnus Ladulås, who extended the privileges of the clergy and practically founded the formal Swedish nobility (see Ordinance of Alsnö, 1280). Founded with this institution was a heavily armed cavalry, the kernel of the national army. The Knights (new nobles) and Burghers became distinguishable from the higher nobility. This period saw the rise of a prominent burgess class, as the towns now began to acquire charters. At the end of the 13th century, and the beginning of the 14th, provincial codes of laws appear and the king and his council also executed legislative and judicial functions.

Although Swedish-speaking culture had been expanding eastwards through Åland and along what are now the coastal regions of Finland for several centuries, the Second Swedish Crusade, undertaken by Birger Jarl in the late 1230s or late 1240s, is generally perceived as the period when the region now called Finland was incorporated into the Swedish state. This region remained an integral part of Sweden until 1809, governed from the city of Åbo (Finnish: Turku).

=== Union between Sweden and Norway ===
The first union between Sweden and Norway occurred in 1319 when the three-year-old Magnus, son of the Swedish royal Duke Eric and of the Norwegian princess Ingeborg, inherited the throne of Norway from his grandfather Haakon V and in the same year was elected King of Sweden, by the Convention of Oslo. The boy king's long minority weakened the royal influence in both countries, and Magnus lost both his kingdoms before his death. In Sweden, Magnus' partialities and necessities led directly to the rise of a powerful landed aristocracy, and, indirectly, to the growth of popular liberties. Forced by the incompetence of the magnates to lean upon the middle classes, in 1359 the king summoned the first Swedish Riksdag, on which occasion representatives from the towns were invited to appear along with the nobles and clergy. The Swedes, irritated by Magnus' misrule, replaced him with his nephew, Albert of Mecklenburg in 1365. Albert was forced to take the first coronation oath in 1371, in which Albert swore to concede many of his powers to the nobility in the Regency Council.

=== Kalmar Union ===
In 1388, at the request of the Swedes, Albert was driven out by Margaret I of Denmark and at a convention of the representatives of the three Scandinavian kingdoms (held at Kalmar in 1397), Margaret's great-nephew, Eric of Pomerania, was elected the common king, although the liberties of each of the three realms were expressly reserved and confirmed. The union was to be a personal, not a political union. Neither Margaret nor her successors observed the stipulation that in each of the three kingdoms only natives should hold land and high office, and the efforts first of Denmark (at that time by far the strongest member of the union) to impose her will on the Union's weaker kingdoms soon produced secessions. The Swedes first broke away from the Union in 1434 under the popular leader Engelbrekt Engelbrektsson, and after his murder they elected Karl Knutsson Bonde as their king with the title of Charles VIII in 1436. In 1441 Charles VIII had to abdicate in favour of Christopher of Bavaria, who was already king of Denmark and Norway; however, upon the death of Christopher in 1448, a state of confusion ensued in the course of which Charles VIII was twice reinstated and twice expelled again. Finally, on his death in 1470, the three kingdoms were reunited under Christian II of Denmark, the prelates and higher nobility of Sweden favouring the union.

== See also ==
- Provinces of Sweden
- History of Scandinavia
- List of runestones
- Swedish History Museum
- Garðar Svavarsson
