= Helena (wife of Inge the Elder) =

Queen of Sweden c.1079–1110

Queen consort of Sweden
- Tenure: c. 1079–c. 1084 and c. 1087–c. 1110
- Born: 11th century Sweden
- Died: early 12th century possibly Vreta Abbey, Sweden
- Burial: Sweden
- Spouse: Inge the Elder
- Issue: Christina, Grand Duchess of Kiev; Ragnvald Ingesson; Margaret, Queen of Norway and Denmark; Katarina Ingesdotter
- House: Stenkil
- Father: Sigtorn? Prince Ingvar of Sweden?
- Religion: Roman Catholicism

Helena or Elin, possibly also known as Maer, Mär or Mö (Old Norse for Maiden) (born in the 11th century – Floruit c. 1105/10), was Queen of Sweden as the wife of King Inge the Elder, and a supposed sister of King Blot-Sweyn of Sweden.

== Name and background ==
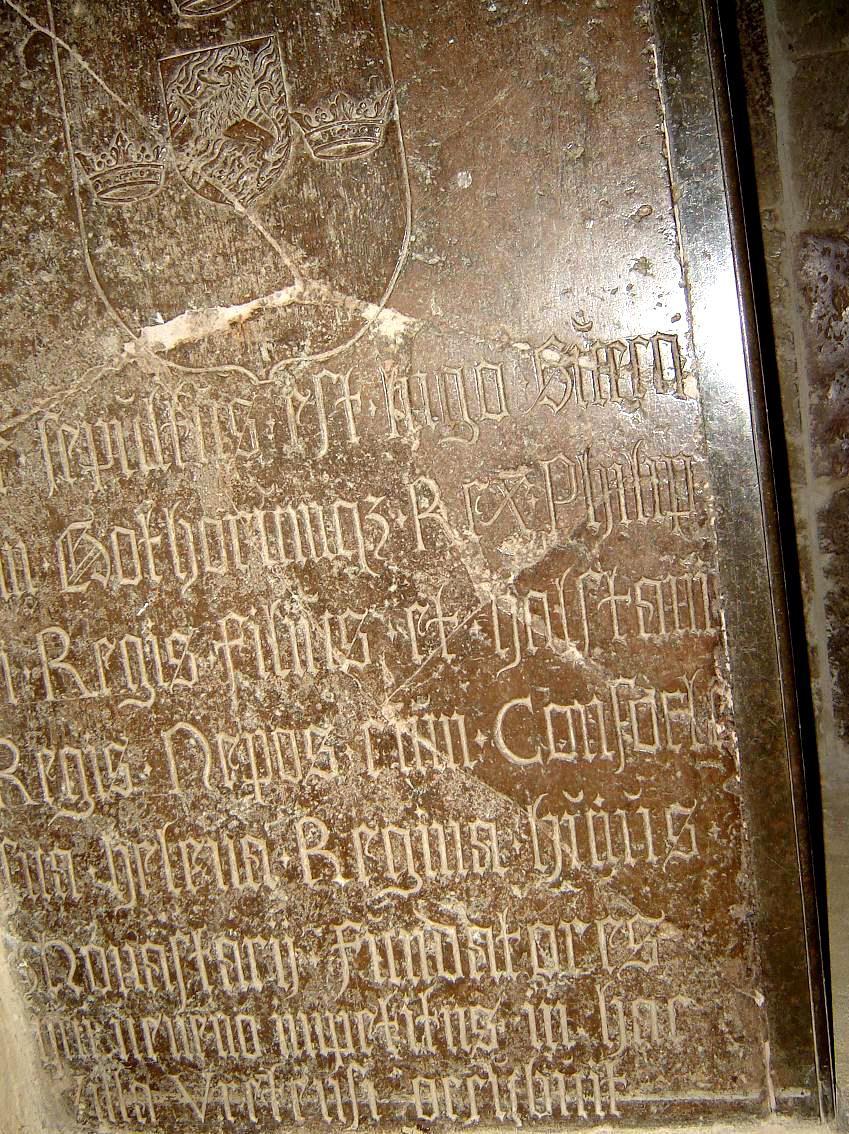
A 17th century gravestone in Vreta Abbey with a partially incorrect inscription mentions an Ingi and a Helen – their burial somewhere in the church has been accepted as fact.

The background of Queen Helena is not confirmed, but her activities as queen show that she had an affiliation to Östergötland. The Icelandic Hervarar saga ok Heiðreks (late 13th century) has the following to say about Inge I's spouse: "King Inge married a woman called Maer [or Mö]; the name of her brother was Sweyn. No one was as beloved by Inge as Sweyn, and Sweyn therefore became a very powerful man in the kingdom". However, an older source, a Danish royal genealogy from c. 1194, gives another name: "The abovementioned Christina, the grandmother of Valdemar [I], was the daughter of the Swedish King Inge and Queen Helena". While "Helena" is the usual Latin spelling of the Swedish Christian name Elin, Maer is simply an old Nordic word for "maiden", "girl" (in modern Swedish, mö), and may not be an actual name; at any rate it is extremely rare as a Scandinavian personal name. Because of this it is sometimes assumed that Inge was married two times. Alternatively, however, they have been assumed to be one and the same person; the maiden Elin, to Christian foreigners spelled as Helena in Latin, sister to Sweyn. According to a third opinion, the sibling pair Maer and Sweyn is legendary or rather allegoric, since it simply translates as "maiden" and "swain".

== Pagan reaction ==
According to the Hervarar saga ok Heiðreks, and the Swedish Legend of Saint Eskil (13th century), Sweyn usurped power from Inge I, who was King of Sweden or parts of Sweden a few times in the interval 1080–1110. Inge is well known as the king who defeated the Swedish pagans in the final stages of a religious strife that took place in Sweden between about 1020 and the 1080s. To a large extent his faction abolished freedom of religion by suppressing old ritual practices and requiring the population to profess the Christian faith. Still, traces of the Nordic religion survived far into the 12th century. Inge's greatest opponent in this fight was his brother-in-law Sweyn who was enthroned as pagan ruler in Svealand, and was known as Blot-Sweyn (Sweyn the Sacrificer). Inge withdrew to Västergötland, but the sources do not tell whether he brought Maer with him. If indeed Maer was identical with Helena and a historical figure, it is unknown which side she favored in the contest between the pagans and Christians. The queen would have witnessed how the war between her Christian spouse and her pagan brother resulted in Inge's triumph in sometime between 1083 and 1087. However, she was considered a pious Christian in her later life.

== Religious endowments ==
Not many things are known about queen Helena, but if she was Blot-Sweyn's sister she was most likely a pagan like her brother before her marriage. In that case she would have been convinced, willingly or by force, to submit to the Christian faith and convert, receiving the name Helena by her christening. Her daughters were also given names from Christian Europe: Christina, Margaret and Catherine. After the defeat of the pagans, she founded Sweden's first known nunnery, the Benedictine Vreta Abbey in Östergötland, jointly with her spouse, some time between c. 1090 and c. 1100. This is known from a 16th-century paraphrase of a medieval list of donations: "King Inge in Sweden ... with his queen Helena, first founded Vreta Abbey; they bestowed goods and farmsteads to it, as follows: 4 attungs [units] of land in Lilla Vreta, 2 attungs in [Kungs-]Bro, 9 attungs in Brunneby, 4 attungs in Håckla, 2 attungs in Mjölorp."

These lands were situated close to Vreta. The royal pair also gave away 2 attungs in Broby, close to Omberg, also in Östergötland. All these East Geatic donations to the convent form a landmark in Swedish medieval history, since no monastery existed in the kingdom before. Perhaps they belonged to the queen, as a dowry or as an inheritance after her alleged brother Sweyn.

The 16th-century list of donations furthermore says that a certain Queen Helena donated land in Slaka parish to Vreta, then entered the abbey as a nun. On the basis of this it has been assumed that Queen Dowager Helena, after the death of her spouse in c. 1105–1110, devoted her last days to monastic life. However, it might also be question of a later Queen Helena, widow of Canute V of Denmark.

== Possible ancestry ==
Several hypotheses have been advanced regarding Helena's or Maer's ancestry. Blot-Sweyn has tentatively been identified with a Sweyn known from Ingvar Vittfarne's Saga (14th century). This person was the son of Prince Ingvar Vittfarne, great-grandson of King Erik Segersäll of Sweden, which would make Maer a third cousin of her spouse. A runestone in Ballingsta parish in Uppland (U861) has the text "Sigtorn ... erected this stone and a bridge after his son Ådjärv and after Mö, his daughter, Etorn and Sweyn and Vigtorn..." Since the stone is from the late 11th century, and the name Mö is otherwise unattested, it has been suggested by runologist Erik Brate that the monument was raised by the father of Queen Mö (Maer) and her brother Blot-Sweyn. Mö's full name would in that case have been Mö Sigtornsdotter. If so Mö-Maer and Helena were probably separate queens, but the equation has been criticized as lacking corroborating evidence. It is also sometimes suggested that Helena was of Greek or Russian origin, but this is unconfirmed and unlikely.

== Confusion with Helena of Skövde ==
Queen Helena or Elin has long been confused in history with Saint Helena of Skövde (d. c. 1135), who lived in Sweden during the same period. This is a misconception which has no support from historians now.

== Children ==
1. Christina, married Grand Duke Mstislav I of Kiev, and ancestress of several Kievan and Novgorodian princes.
2. Ragnvald, who died before his father and who was father of Ingrid, who first was married to the Danish prince Henrik Skadelår, and later to the Norwegian king Harald Gille. She was the mother of pretender (and alleged murderer) Magnus Henriksson.
3. Margaret Fredkulla, married (1) Magnus Barefoot, king of Norway, and later king Niels of Denmark; through her second marriage, she was the mother of King Magnus the Strong of Västergötland and claimant of Denmark.
4. Catherine, married a Danish "Son of King", Björn Ironside Haraldsson, with whom she had a daughter Christina Bjornsdatter who married the future Eric IX of Sweden.

== Sources ==
- Lars O. Lagerqvist (1982). "Sverige och dess regenter under 1.000 år",("Sweden and its rulers during 1000 years") (in Swedish). Albert Bonniers Förlag AB. ISBN 91-0-075007-7.
- Sven Rosborn (in Swedish): När hände vad i Nordens historia (When did what happen in the history of the Nordic countries) (1997)
- Svensk Uppslagsbok, 1947 års Utgåva.(Swedish dictionary, 1947 edition) (in Swedish)

== Succession ==
Helena (Elin), also called Maer/Mär/Mö Born: 11th century Died: after 1105
Swedish royalty
| Preceded by Unknown; Last known consort:Gyla | Queen consort of Sweden; 1079–1084 | Succeeded by Blotstulka |
| Preceded by Blotstulka | Queen consort of Sweden; 1087–1105 | Succeeded by Ingegerd Haraldsdotter |
