= Margaret of Sweden =

Margaret of Sweden, also Martha, Margareta, Margaretha or Märta/Märtha, may refer to:

- Martha of Denmark or Martha, Queen consort of Sweden 1298
- Margaret I of Denmark, Queen consort 1363 and ruler 1389
- Margaret Leijonhufvud, Queen consort of Sweden 1536
- Margaret Fredkulla, Swedish princess, died 1130
- Margaret of Sweden, Queen of Norway, Swedish princess, died 1209
- Margaret, Swedish princess, died 1288, daughter of King Valdemar of Sweden, nun
- Margaret, Swedish princess 1448, daughter of King Charles VIII of Sweden
- Margaret of Denmark, Queen of Scotland, Swedish princess 1457
- Margareta Elizabeth, Princess of Sweden 1580, daughter of King Charles IX of Sweden (died young)
- Princess Margaretha of Sweden, Princess of Sweden and Norway 1899
- Princess Märtha of Sweden, Princess of Sweden and Norway 1901
- Princess Margaret of Connaught, Crown Princess of Sweden 1907
- Princess Margaretha, Mrs. Ambler, Princess of Sweden 1934
