= Kata Farm =

Viking-age farm in Varnhem, Sweden

Coordinates: 58°23′00″N 13°39′22″E

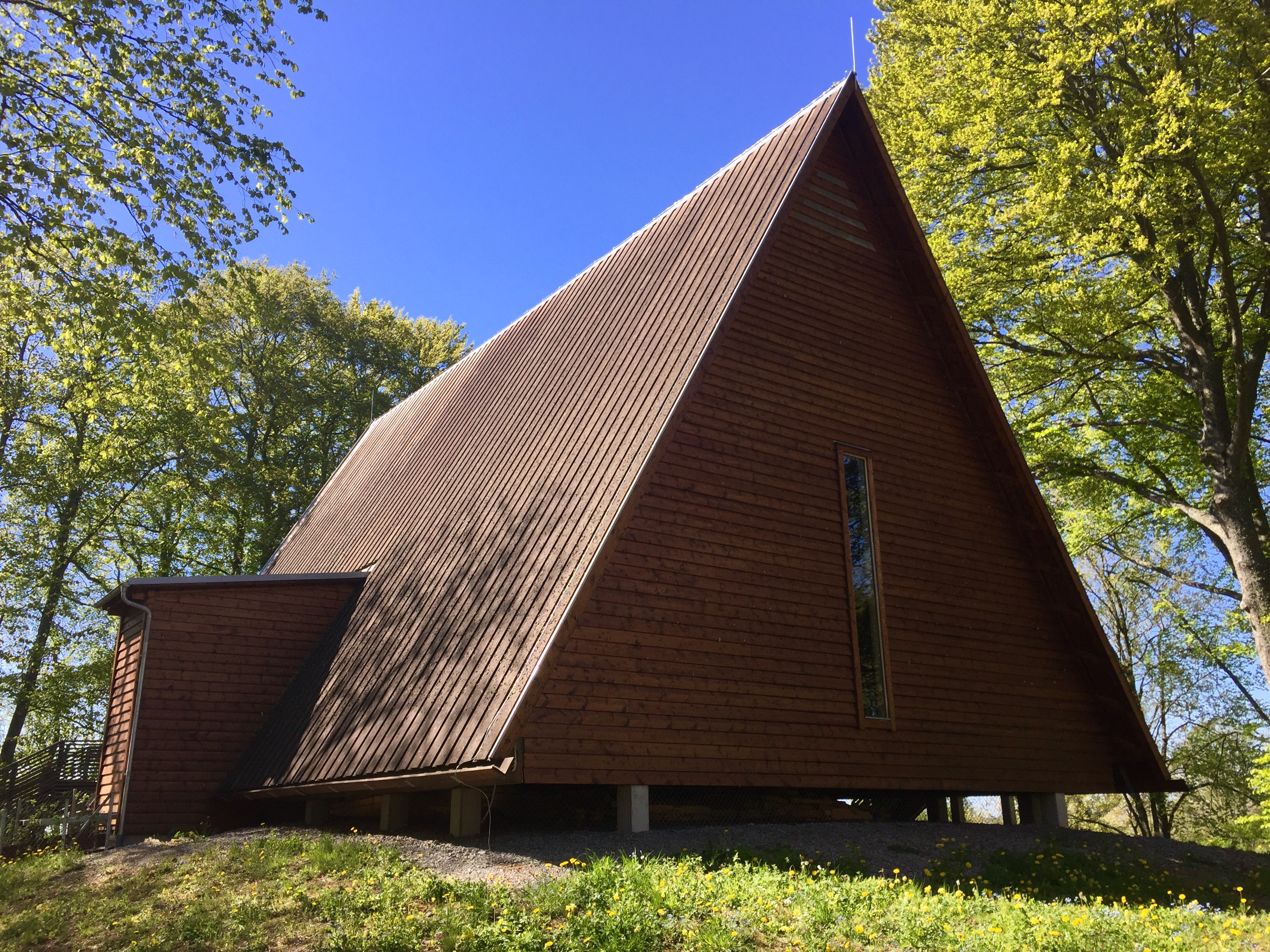
Kata Farm in 2019

Kata Farm (Swedish: Kata Gård) is the remains of a large Viking-age farming estate, located in Varnhem, Västra Götaland. The ruins include a crypt dated to the late 10th century A.D., which could make it the oldest Christian church in Sweden.

== History ==
Until recently, Sweden was considered to have begun its Christianisation in the year 1000, when the king Olof Skötkonung was baptised by the English missionary-bishop Sigfrid of Sweden. The name Kata Farm derives from one of its presumed owners, a woman named Kata, who lived in the early 11th century A.D., and whose grave has been found on the grounds.

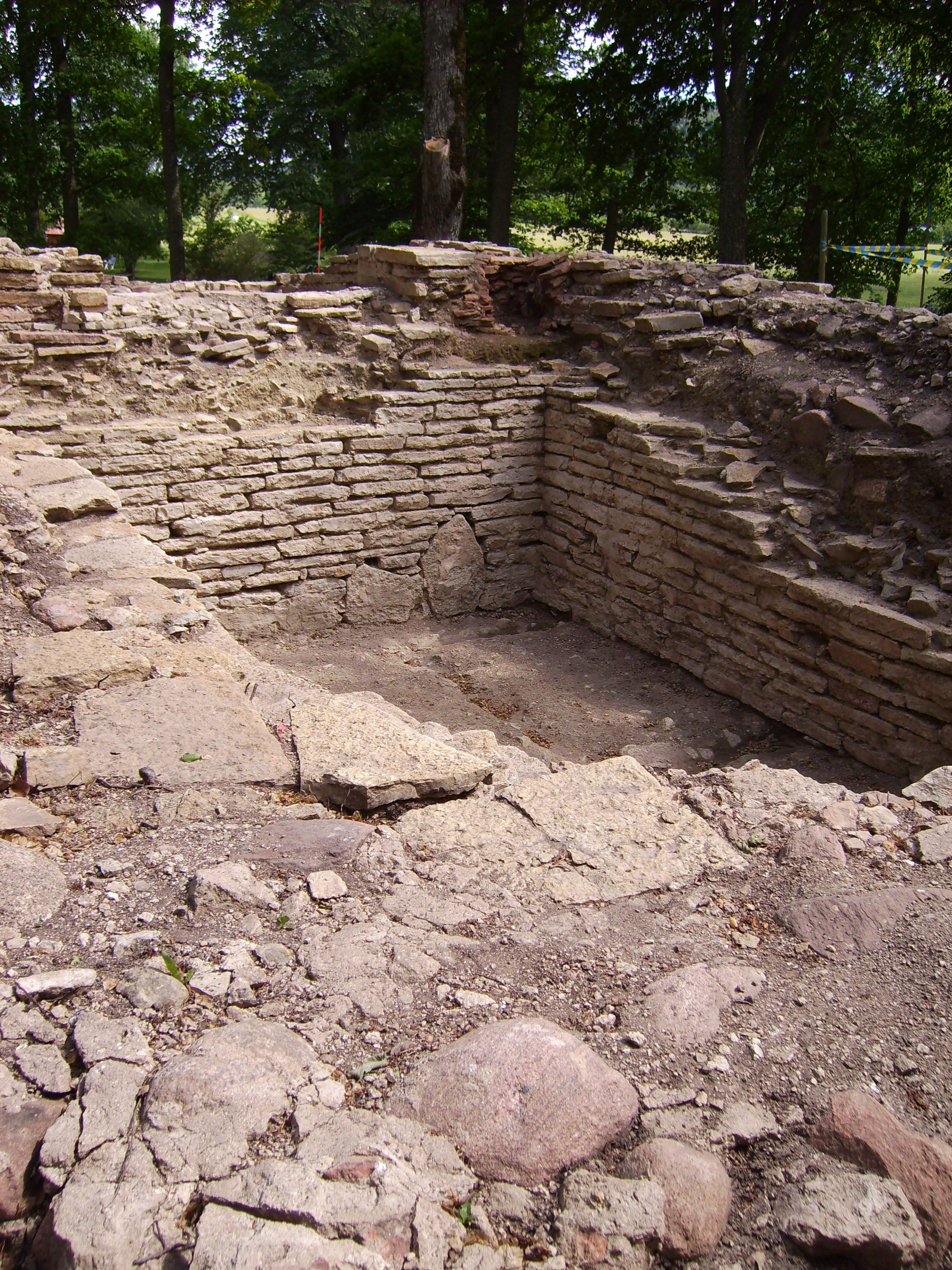
Part of the excavation of the Varnhem monastery at Kata Farm in 2007

The original church built on the estate in the late 10th century was made of wood. It was later replaced with a larger church building, made of stone. It is evident that builders from outside of Västergötland – most likely from Denmark, Germany, and England – erected the stone structure, as such building methods were not known in Sweden at the time. This may however have started a trend in Västergötland to build churches of stone, as these proliferate from the 11th century onwards. Churches at the time were built on private estates, and were a sign of the wealth and power of the landowners.

The 4,000 square metres (43,000 ft^{2}) cemetery, created around the same time the wooden church, contains thousands of graves. The landowner families were placed closest to the church, while servants and slaves were buried on the outskirts. Men were buried south of the church, women to the north. The wealthy were buried in limestone or wooden coffins, the poor were put straight in the ground. The bodies were buried with the feet to east, according to christian tradition. The oldest remains were dated to the 10th century, before the earliest historical account of Christianity in Sweden.

Excavations of the hill near Varnhem Abbey started in 2005 and continued for 12 years. The artefacts found during the digs are on display at the Museum of Västergötland in Skara. Residents of the estate were wealthy engaged in long distance trade, ancient Roman and English coins have been found, as well as skeletons of greyhounds, a status symbol in ancient Rome but very unusual at northern latitudes.

Kata's grave, sealed with an engraved runestone bearing a cross, was discovered just north of the church. In close proximity, another grave containing a man has been found. It is believed that this is Kata's husband Kättil, who had the runestone made for his wife. The inscription reads: "Kätill made this stone after Kata his wife sister of Torgil".

The last private owner of the Varnhem Estate was Mistress Sigrid, related to then-queen Kristina Björnsdotter of the House of Stenkil. Mistress Sigrid donated the estate to the church, in order to establish a Cistercian monastery on the premises. The stone church was included in the donation to the monks, but as they built their own, much larger church, it was instead used for other purposes such as storage and crafts. It was probably demolished some time during the Middle Ages, and the stone walls were transported and used elsewhere.

A large hall has been erected over the crypt, with a glass floor allowing visitors to view the crypt and Kata's grave. Officially inaugurated on 7 May 2017, the hall also features the exhibition Christian Vikings in Varnhem, as well as scale models of both the wooden and stone churches. Despite lacking walls, the superstructure protects the ruins from damage from sun and rain. The site was nominated for the 2018 World Architecture Festival World Building of the Year award.

== See also ==
- Axevalla House (castle ruins)
- List of runestones
