= Katarina Ingesdotter =

12th-century Swedish princess

- Born: c. 1100
- Spouse: Bjørn Haraldsen Ironside
- Issue: Christina of Denmark, Queen of Sweden
- House: Stenkil
- Father: Inge the Elder
- Mother: Helena

Katarina Ingesdotter (fl. 1110) was a Swedish princess who married the Danish prince Bjørn Haraldsen Ironside.

== Life ==
Katarina was the daughter of King Inge the Elder of Sweden and Queen Helena. She was the sister of Christina Ingesdotter and Margaret Fredkulla. Katarina was the youngest of the three royal daughters: her sister Christina married in the 1090s, and her sister Margaret in 1101. Katarina is assumed to have been of about the same age as her future spouse, and was thus born in around the year 1100.

Katarina's father died in 1110, and was succeeded on the Swedish throne by his nephews. By the time of her father's death, Katarina would still have been a child. Her mother is reported to have entered Vreta Abbey as a widow. Her eldest sister, Christina, lived in Kievan-Rus', and was in Sweden considered as too far away to be given a share in the inheritance of their father. Their sister Margaret was at this point queen of Denmark. It is known that Margaret shared her inheritance with her niece Ingrid in Norway, and her niece Ingeborg in Denmark. Katarina is not mentioned in these transactions, but as the only unmarried daughter of Inge left in Sweden, she would have been one of his heirs.

According to the Knýtlinga saga, Katarina married the Danish prince Bjørn Haraldsen Ironside. Only one child is known from this union: their daughter Christina, future queen of Sweden, who is estimated to have been born in circa the year 1122.

In 1134, Katarina's spouse sided with his uncle Eric II of Denmark in the Danish war of succession, but was killed by Eric the same year. Her daughter Christina is estimated to have married the future king Eric IX of Sweden in the 1140s.

== Issue ==
1. Christina of Denmark, Queen of Sweden, married to Eric IX of Sweden.
