= Katarina Eriksdotter =

12th-century Swedish princess

Katarina Eriksdotter (fl. 12th-century) was a Swedish princess, daughter of King Eric the Saint and his queen Kristina.

== Biography ==
She married Nils Blake, who probably was a Swedish magnate. They had a daughter, Kristina Nilsdotter, who married the Norwegian Earl Hakon the Mad, and later Eskil Magnusson, the lawspeaker of Västergötland.
