= Kristina Nilsdotter =

Swedish noblewoman (died 1254)

Kristina Nilsdotter Blake (died 1254), was a Swedish noblewoman. Kristina and her spouse were written of by poet Snorri Sturlasson, who visited them in 1219; they reportedly gave him valuable information for his writings. Kristina was the daughter of princess Catherine of Sweden and Norwegian nobleman Nils Blake. She married the Norwegian earl Hakon the Mad (Håkon Galen) in 1205. He was the half-brother of the Norwegian king Inge Bårdsson. She was the mother of Knut Haakonsson (c. 1208–1261) who was later a claimant to the throne during the Civil war era in Norway.

After the death of Håkon, Kristina took their son Knut with her and returned to Västergötland where she married Swedish nobleman, Eskil Magnusson (c. 1175–1227), the lawspeaker of Västergötland and elder brother of Birger Jarl.
