= Axevalla House =

Medieval castle ruins in Sweden

Coordinates: 58.3934°N 13.6028°E

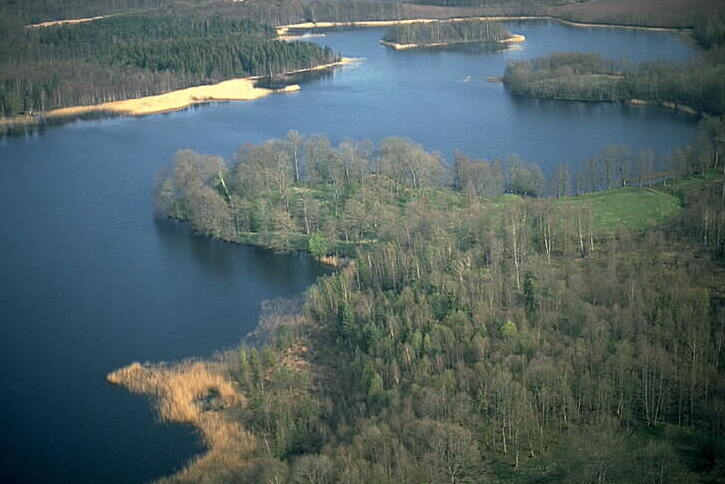
Aerial photo of Axevalla House

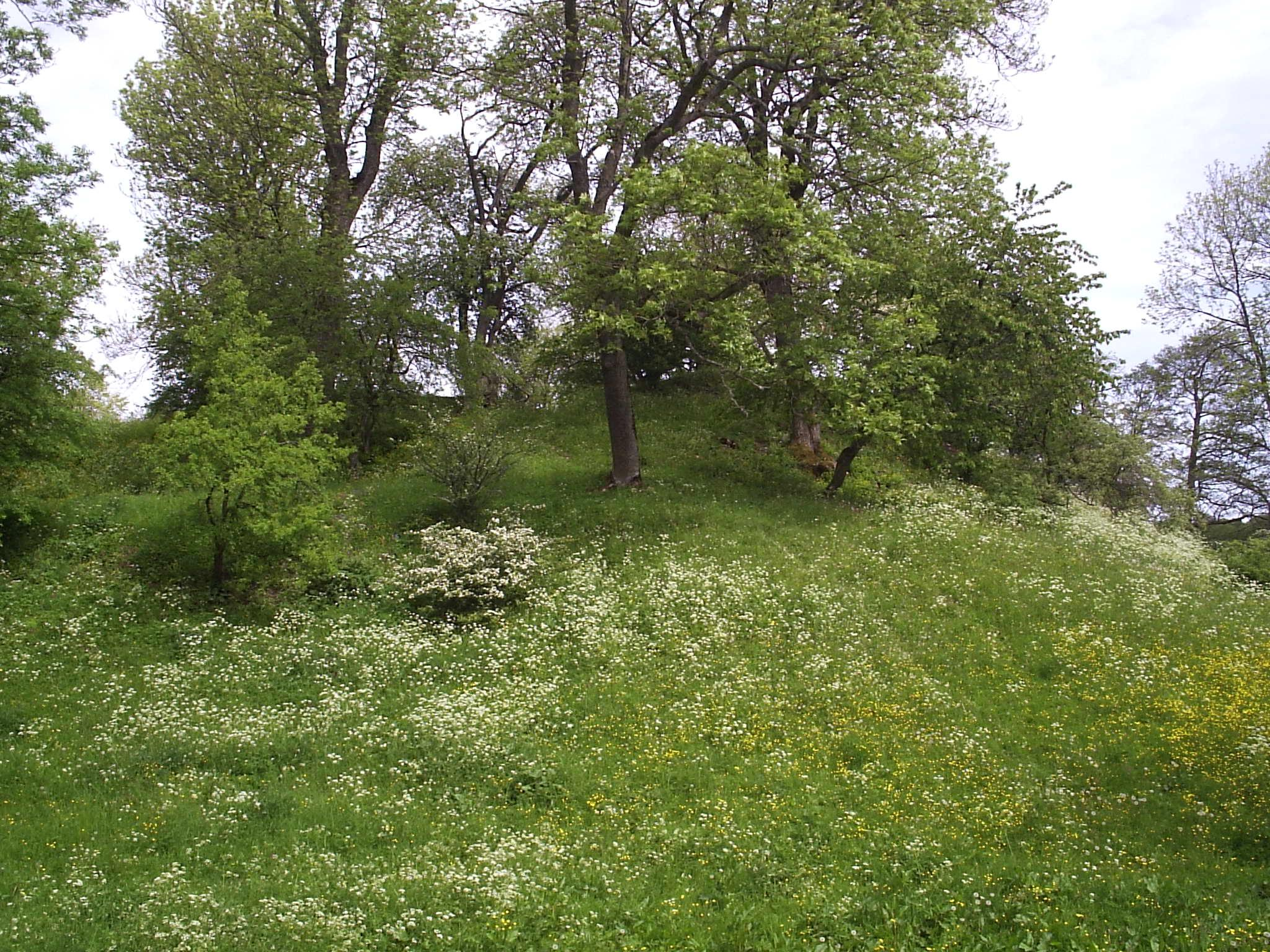
Axevalla house, main fort

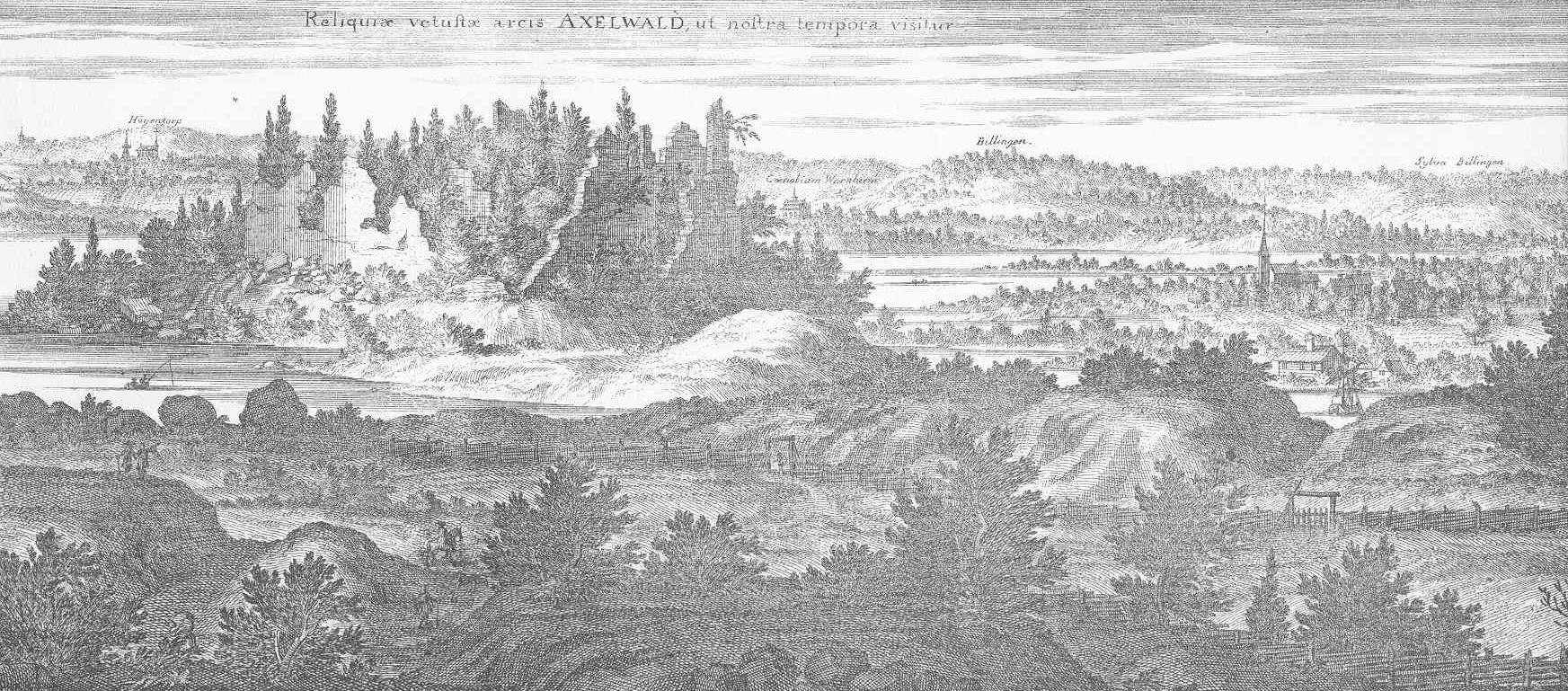
Axevalla house, as depicted in Suecia antiqua et hodierna

Axevalla House (Axevalla hus) is the ruins of a medieval castle in the parish of Skärv in the municipality of Skara, Västergötland, Sweden. It is located on a headland by Lake Husesjön, east of the heathland of Axevalla Hed and halfway between the cities Skara and Skövde.

== History ==
The castle was first mentioned in 1278, when Magnus Ladulås was taken prisoner there during a feast by his host Peter Porse. A further reference was made to the castle as the new castle in Axavald (novum castrum in Axsawaldh) in 1315, and again in 1321, when it was called "the New House", suggesting it replaced an earlier construction.

When Magnus Ladulås died in 1290, the kingdom was divided between his sons Birger, Erik and Valdemar. Axevalla was given to Duke Erik, and after his death in 1318 as a prisoner at Nyköpings hus, his widow Ingeborg Håkansdotter – mother of the still underage King Magnus Eriksson – received the estate as her residence.

Her contacts with the mighty Danish family Porse was considered a threat to the Swedish Crown, as Axevalla House was an important defence in the ongoing wars between the Nordic countries. It was therefore decided against Ingeborg's will, that the castle should be returned to the Crown. Failing to reach a peaceful agreement, the castle was besieged in 1323. The conflict ended with the Peace of Skara in 1326, where it was decided that Ingeborg Håkansdotter should relinquish Axevalla House and instead move to the estate of Dåvö in Munktorp in Västmanland. Her ”dangerous liaisons” had been broken.

In early 14th century, the castle was remodelled. The main fortress measured 52 x 44 metres and was surrounded by fortifications, ramparts, and a moat. Palisades stretched into the lake and the stone road leading to the castle was surrounded by swamp.

In 1367, it fell into the hands of King Albrekt of Mecklenburg. Subsequent to his defeat at Åsle in 1389, it passed to Queen Margaret of Denmark and became a residence for Danish sheriffs. Engelbrekt Engelbrektsson tried unsuccessfully to capture it in 1434, and after a second siege in 1436, the peace negotiations were suspended. The sheriff did however voluntarily turn the castle over to the Swedes shortly after.

It would be fair to assume that Axevalla House formed part of a defence line against Danish forces. During the battles between kings Charles VIII of Sweden and Christian I of Denmark, it was attacked by an uprising of disgruntled farmers and burnt to the ground. It was never rebuilt. The castle is depicted in Suecia antiqua et hodierna, a collection of engravings collected during the middle of the 17th century by Erik Dahlbergh. Hardly any visible traces now remain of the building above ground.

== See also ==
- Kata Farm (church ruin)
- Varnhem Abbey

== Other Sources ==
- Henrikson, Alf (2013-07-18). Svensk Historia (in Swedish). Albert Bonniers Förlag. ISBN 9789100136567.
