= Saint Erik =

King of Sweden from c. 1156 to 1160

Eric IX
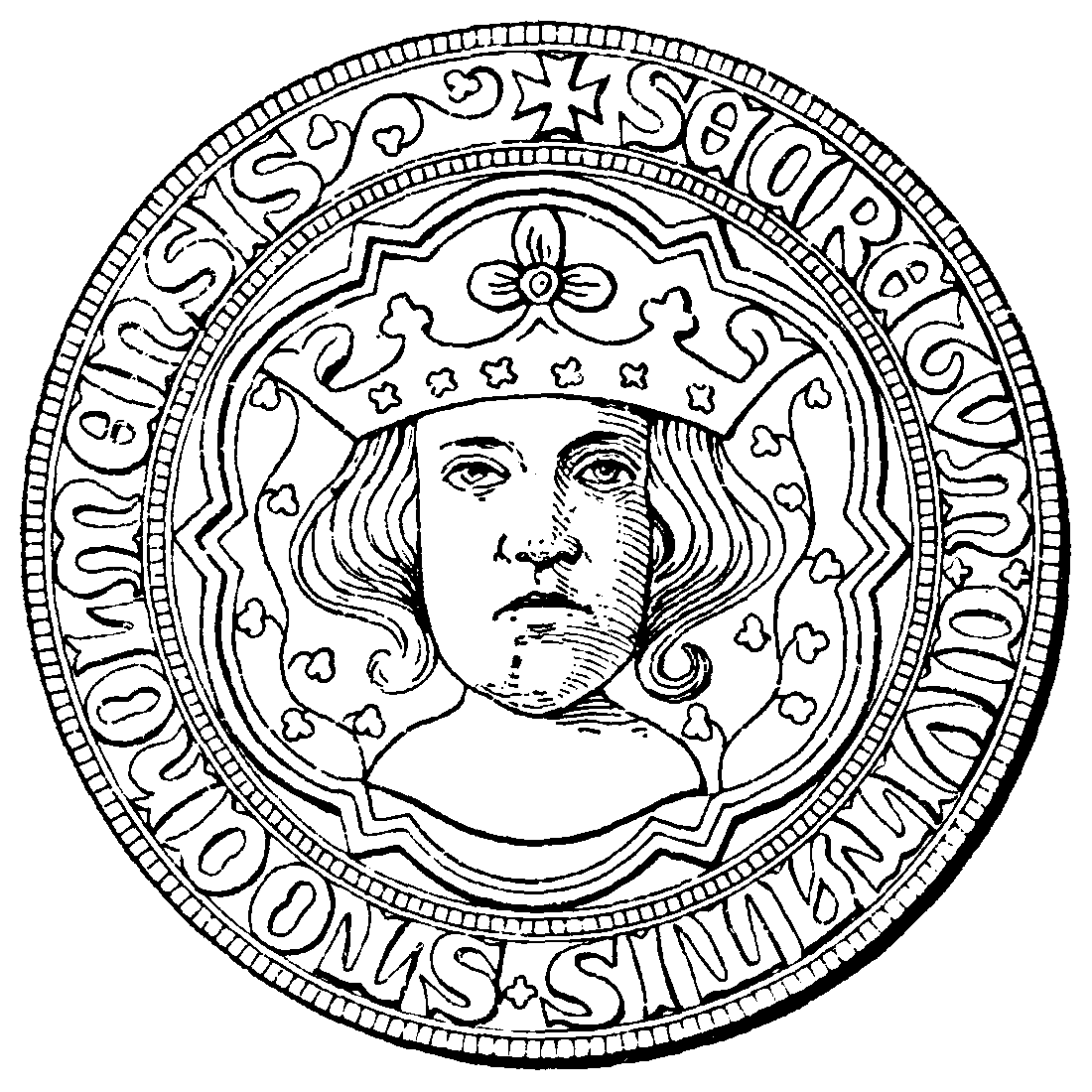
- A depiction of King Erik on Stockholm's city seal. First known use in 1376.

King of Sweden
- Reign: c. 1156 – 18 May 1160
- Predecessor: Sverker the Elder
- Successor: Magnus Henriksen
- Born: c. 1120–1125
- Died: 18 May 1160; Uppsala, Sweden
- Burial: Church of Old Uppsala, later moved to Uppsala Cathedral
- Spouse: Christina of Denmark
- Issue Detail: Knut, King of Sweden; Filip Eriksson; Katarina Eriksdotter; Margaret, Queen of Norway
- House: Erik
- Father: Jedvard
- Religion: Roman Catholicism

Saint Erik
- Born: c. 1120–1125
- Died: May 18 1160
- Venerated in: Catholic Church
- Feast: May 18

Saint Erik (c. 1125 – 18 May 1160), also called Eric IX (Note: Referring to Erik Jedvardsson as King Erik IX is a later invention, counting backwards from Erik XIV (1560–1568). Erik XIV and his brother Charles IX (1604–1611) adopted numerals according to a fictitious history of Sweden. The number of Swedish monarchs named Erik before Erik XIV (at least seven) is unknown and none of them used numerals. It would be speculative to try to affix a mathematically accurate one to this king.) or Erik Jedvardsson (Note: Other names include Erik the Holy, and Erik the Lawgiver. Modern Swedish names include Erik den helige or Sankt Erik.) was King of Sweden from c. 1156 until his death in 1160. The Roman Martyrology of the Catholic Church names him as a saint memorialized on 18 May. He was the founder of the House of Erik, which ruled Sweden with interruptions from c. 1156 to 1250.

== Background ==
As later kings from the House of Erik were consistently buried at Varnhem Abbey near Skara in Västergötland, Erik's family is considered to have Geatish roots like other medieval ruling houses in Sweden. Osteological investigations of Erik's remains suggest that he may have lived the last 10–15 years of his life in Västergötland rather than in Uppland where he died. On the other hand, the only manor he is known to have possessed is situated in Västmanland in Svealand. Eriksberg in central Västergötland has been suggested as the original family manor.

Erik had a brother whose name began with a "J"; this brother has been identified with a Joar Jedvardsson. This in turn fits with King Sverre's Saga, which refers to "Eirik the Saint, son of Jatvard". Late medieval Swedish tradition likewise knows the king by the name Erik Jedvardsson. The name of the father, Jedvard (Edward), is not Scandinavian and may point to English missionary influence. According to 14th-century tradition, Erik's mother was Cecilia, a daughter of King Blot-Sweyn. This information is disputed, however.

== Legend ==
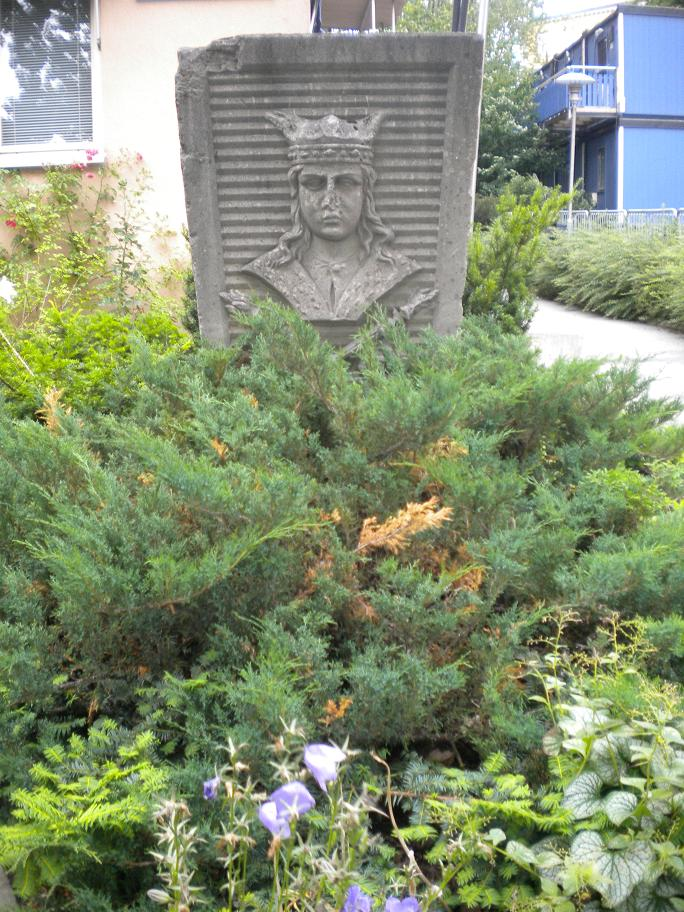
One of the many images of Saint Erik in Stockholm as the city's symbolic patron.

No contemporary sources with information about Erik have been found, and the first written mention of him is in a letter during the reign of his son Knut Eriksson. The letter refers to Erik as "King of the Swedes"; the only full account of Erik's life is a hagiographical legend dating from the late 13th century. The historicity of the legend has been much-discussed by Swedish historians. It tells that Erik was of royal blood and was unanimously chosen king of Sweden when there was a vacancy of the kingship. It also states that Erik reigned for ten years, which would put the beginning of his reign in c. 1150. If this is correct he would have been a rival king to Sverker I, who had ascended the throne in c. 1132 and was murdered in 1156. At any rate it is assumed that Erik was recognized in most provinces after 1156. While his paternity is obscure, there is good evidence that he strengthened his claims to the throne by marriage to the Danish princess Christina Björnsdotter, a granddaughter of King Inge the Elder. His realm did not include Östergötland, where Sverker's son Karl Sverkersson ruled in the late 1150s.

According to the legend, Erik did much to consolidate Christianity in his realm. However, the only reliable source mentioning his reign is a Cistercian chronicle from c. 1200. Quite contrary to the impression of pro-clerical policy of the Erik Legend, it says that King Erik and Queen Christina harassed the monks of Varnhem Abbey in Västergötland. Some monks left for Denmark where Vitskøl Abbey was founded in 1158. After this, however, Erik and Christina changed their stance and allowed Varnhem to be reorganized under Abbot Gerhard of Alvastra Abbey. An early 13th-century source adds that he made donations to Nydala Abbey in Småland.

== Crusade to Finland ==
Legend also attributes Erik with the initial spread of the Christian faith into Finland, "which at this time was pagan and did Sweden great harm". In an effort to conquer and convert the Finns, he allegedly led the First Swedish Crusade east of the Baltic Sea.

"Then Eric the Saint asked the people of Finland to accept Christianity and make peace with him. But when they refused to accept it, he fought against them and conquered them by the sword, avenging the blood of the Christian men which they had spilled often and for a long time. And when he had scored such an honourable victory he prayed to God, falling on his knees with tears in his eyes. Then one of his good men asked why he cried, since he should rejoice over the honourable victory which he had won over the enemies of Jesus Christ and the holy faith. He then replied: I am happy and praise God since he gave us victory. But I greatly regret that so many souls were lost today, who could have gained eternal life if they had accepted Christianity."

Erik persuaded an English Bishop Henry of Uppsala to remain in Finland to evangelize the Finns, later becoming a martyr.

There is no direct confirmation from other sources of this "crusade". However, a papal bull from the early 1170s does mention complaints that "the Finns always, when they are threatened by hostile armies, promise to keep the Christian creed and eagerly ask for preachers and teachers in the Christian law; but when the army returns, they deny the faith and despise and persecute the preachers badly". The bull implies that the Swedes already stood in a certain relation to the Finns and conducted expeditions against them. Moreover, a papal letter from 1216 reserved for Erik's grandson Erik Knutsson the right to pagan lands conquered by his ancestors. If interpreted literally this might allude to conquests in Finland conducted by Saint Erik and Knut Eriksson (his grandfather and father). If the "crusade" took place, it was however probably no more than a sea-borne raid.

== Achievements ==
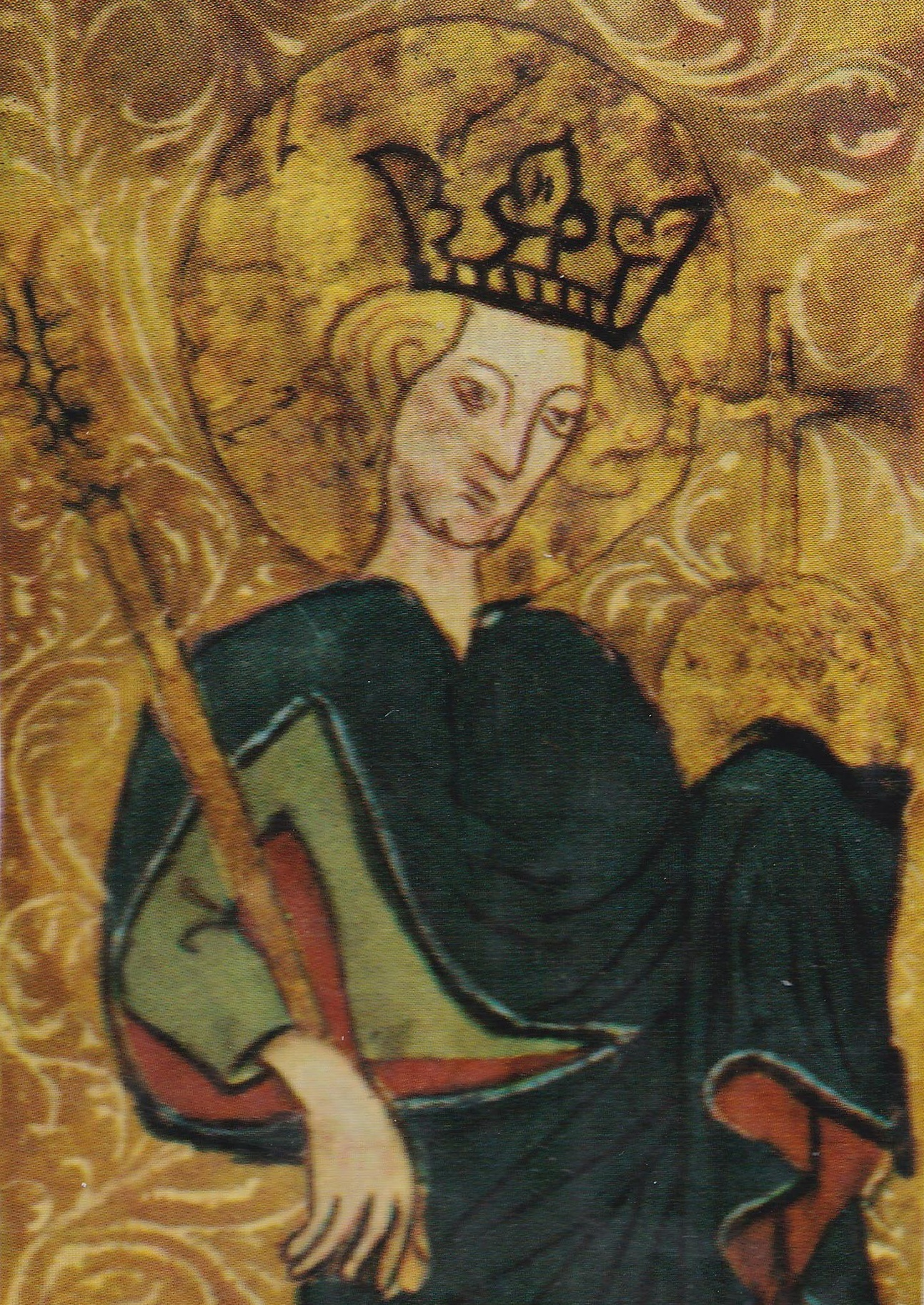
Mediieval church portrait

Erik is portrayed in the legend as the ideal of a just ruler, who supported those who were oppressed by the mighty, and expelled the rude and unfair from his kingdom. He was supposedly responsible for codifying the laws of his kingdom, which became known as King Erik's Law. Additionally, a hypothesis argues that he established a monastic chapter in Old Uppsala, begun by Benedictines which had come from the Danish abbey of Odense or from Vreta Abbey. If so, he would have established an unpopular system of tithes to support the Church similar to elsewhere in Europe. The legend strongly accentuates Erik's personal piety: "This saintly king of ours conducted many godly prayers and sessions, as well as fasting. He showed empathy with people in distress, was generous in giving alms to poor people, and forced himself to wear a shirt of horsehair, which he used when he was mortifying the flesh ... How he dealt with his secret enemy which is in the sexual parts, that is seen from the circumstance, that when he observed celibacy at fasting or religious celebrations, he often took a secret bath in a cold tub of water - even in wintertime - thus expelling non-permissible body heat with the cold." While much of this may reasonably be regarded as hagiographical stereotypes, the scientific investigation of his remains shows that he consumed much freshwater fish, indicating observance of fasts.

== Assassination ==
While the legend asserts that Erik was unanimously accepted as king, the circumstances reveal that this was not the case. Apart from Karl Sverkersson in Östergötland, the Danish prince Magnus Henriksen had a claim to the throne, being the great-grandson of Inge I and the great-great-grandson of King Sweyn Estridson of Denmark.

According to the legend, the Devil inspired Magnus in his machinations. He used gifts and grand promises to attract Swedish nobles, including "a mighty man in the kingdom". If this is based on sound tradition it may mean that Magnus allied with Karl of the rival House of Sverker. This assumption is supported by a statement in a late medieval chronicle.

Unbeknownst to the king, the allies gathered a considerable army and accosted Erik near Uppsala at Östra Aros when he attended Mass on the Feast of the Ascension in May 1160. The king, being informed of the approach of the enemy, heard mass to the end, then armed himself and the few men at hand, and went out to meet Magnus' troops. He was pulled off his horse onto the ground by the swarming rebels, who taunted and stabbed him, then beheaded him.

Some of the details of Erik's violent end seem to be corroborated by a scientific investigation of his bones (see below). Otherwise, a papal bull to his son Knut confirms that he was killed by unspecified enemies. The short chronicle in the Västgötalagen from c. 1250 says: "The twelfth was King Erik. He was too soon put to death at an unfortunate moment, He always made good deeds while he was alive, and was therefore rewarded by God and his angels; his bones rest in Uppsala. He has there presented many good portents by the grace of God." In a letter from 1172, Pope Alexander III complains that some people in Sweden had begun worshiping "a man who had been killed in debauchery and feasting". Some scholars have assumed that this alludes to King Erik, and that the celebration of the Ascension Day was accompanied by feasting which enabled the surprise rebel attack. The identification is uncertain, however.

== Succession ==
After killing Erik, Magnus Henriksen was able to take power. However, Magnus' reign proved short and he never fully consolidated the kingdom before likewise dying at rivals' hands in the following year. Likewise his slayer (and possible co-conspirator in Erik's death) Karl Sverkersson, was assassinated in 1167 after Erik's son Knut returned from exile. Knut defeated his Sverker rivals by 1173 and unified the kingdom in the decades before his death in 1195 or 1196. While Erik had been a short-lived and ultimately unsuccessful ruler, Knut established the House of Erik as the ruling dynasty and used the memory of his father to anchor his regime. He was indirectly succeeded by his son Erik Knutsson and grandson Erik Eriksson.

== Family ==
Erik was married to Kristina Björnsdotter of the Danish House of Estridsen. Their children were:

- Knut, King of Sweden from 1167 to 1196.
- Filip, whom some historians identify as the father of Holmger, father of King Knut Långe.
- Katarina, who married Nils Blake.
- Margaret, who married Sverre I of Norway in 1185 and died in 1202.

== Veneration ==
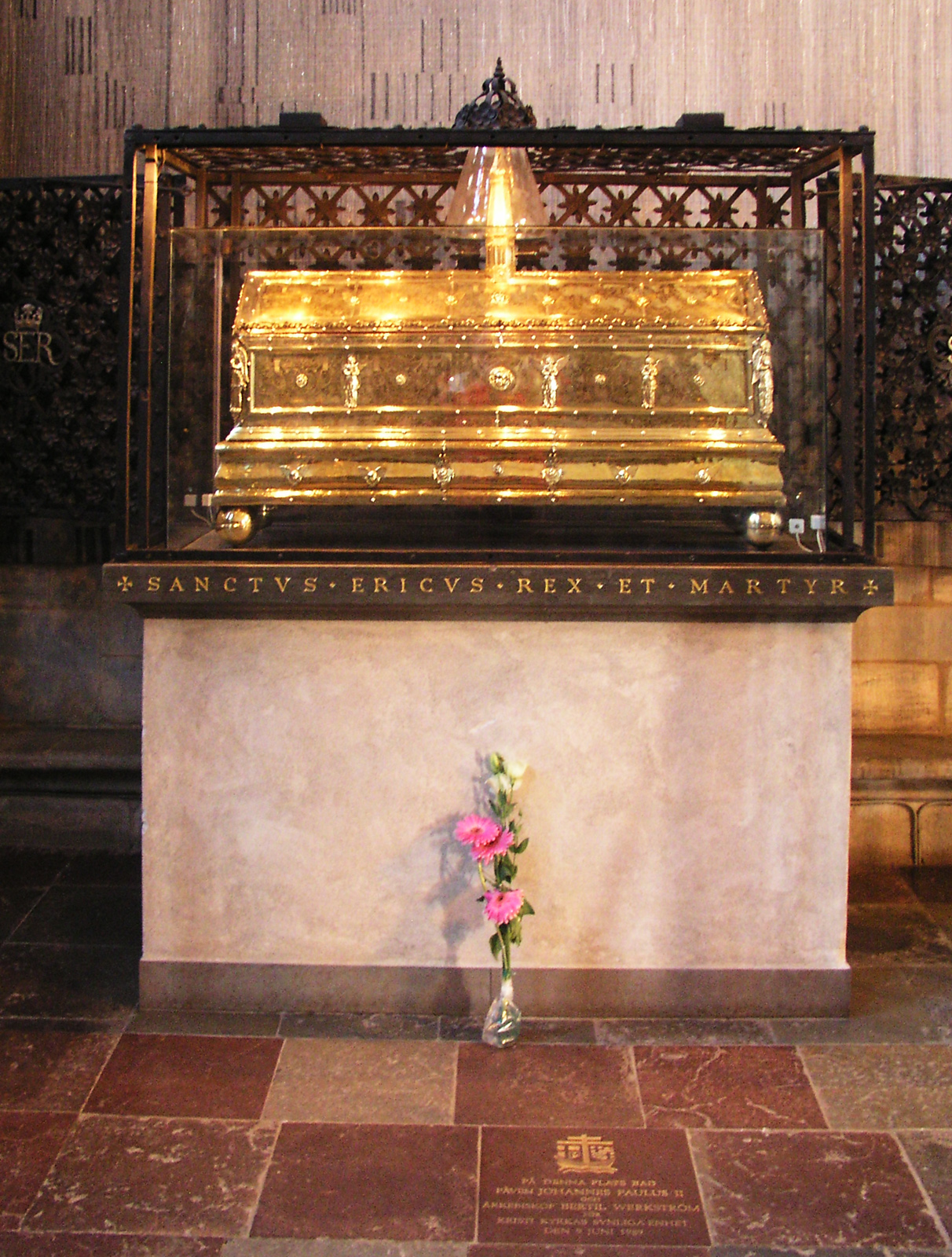
Silver-gilt reliquary of Erik the Saint, Uppsala Cathedral

The assassinated king Erik was buried in the Old Uppsala church, which he had rebuilt around the burial mounds of his pagan predecessors. In about 1167, as his son began to take power after the death of the latest Sverker king, Erik's body was enshrined, although there is no direct evidence for this until c. 1220. Erik's son Knut encouraged veneration of his father as a martyr, as seen from the so-called Vallentuna Calendar from 1198. Facts and fiction about his life were inseparably mixed together, including the alleged miracle of a fountain springing from the earth where the king's head fell after being cut off. In 1273, a century after Knut consolidated Sweden, Erik's relics and regalia were transferred to the present cathedral of Uppsala, built on the martyrdom site. The translation both displayed and extended the depth of his religious following.

The Evangelical Lutheran Church in America commemorates Erik on May 18 as "Erik, King of Sweden, martyr, 1160". Erik is commemorated by the Roman Catholic Church on 18 May. Swedish traditions included processions on his feast day from the cathedral to Old Uppsala to petition for a good harvest. The Catholic St. Eric's Cathedral, Stockholm, is named for King Erik.

=== Reliquary ===
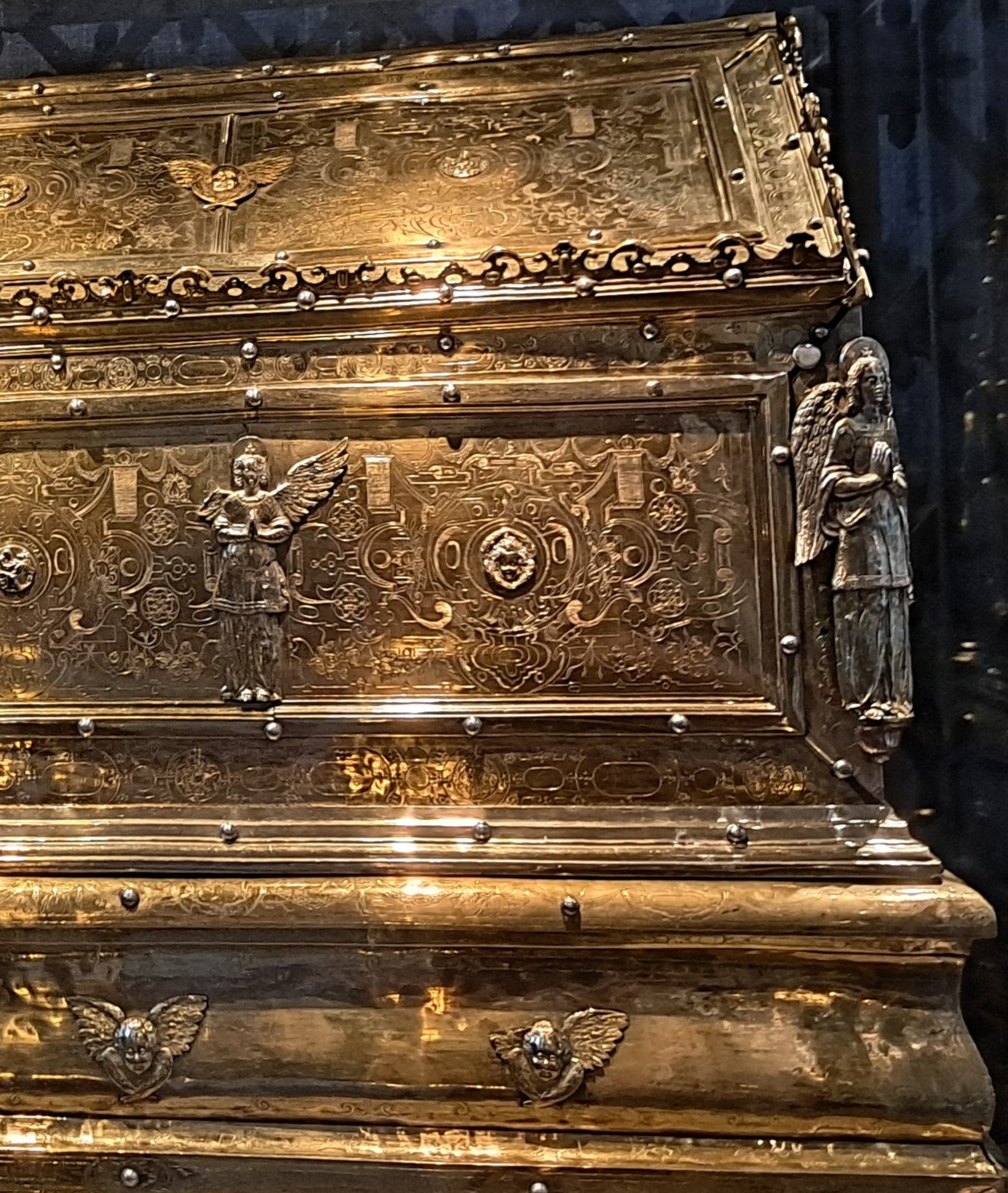
A closeup showing the artwork of the casket.

Uppsala Cathedral (Swedish: Uppsala domkyrka) continues to display the relic casket. During the Middle Ages, each new Swedish king took his oath of office with his hands on the reliquary. The original medieval casket was melted down by Johan III, partly in order to pay off the Älvsborg ransom required by the Treaty of Stettin (1570) and to finance war against Russia. The present Renaissance style casket was commissioned in the 1570s to contain his relics by Johan's Polish Catholic queen, Catherine Jagiellon.

In April, 2014, Swedish researchers opened the current reliquary to examine its contents, and the cathedral displayed the funerary crown during the forensic examination period. On March 19, 2016, researchers announced preliminary results that Erik's relics contained injuries consistent with legends of his demise, and that they would soon publish a detailed account. Twenty-three of the twenty-four bones in the reliquary came from the same 35 to 40-year-old male (the other bone, a shinbone, is from a male from the same time period). The dead person was a strongly built man of about 171 centimeters, adequately fed and well-trained. Not only did the bones display healed wounds consistent with the Finnish crusade and a lifetime of battles, the decapitated body contained multiple stab wounds in the back from around the time of death. Further injuries to the vertebrae in the neck could only have happened outside of battle, since during battle a hauberk would have protected those neck vertebrae.

=== Patronage ===
Coat of arms of Stockholm, depicting Saint Erik and based on a medieval seal

Coat of arms of the Royal Guards and the Commandant General in Stockholm

Erik is the patron saint of Sweden and its capital, Stockholm. His crowned head is depicted on the city's coat of arms, as well as those of the Royal Guards and the Commandant General in Stockholm.

In art, Saint Erik is portrayed as a young king being murdered during Mass, alongside Bishop Henry of Uppsala. Uppsala Cathedral contains a series of late medieval paintings depicting Erik and Henry.

== Archaeological evidence of Trinity Church ==
According to legend, Erik was slain following his attendance at Mass in the ecclesia Sancte trinitatis "Trinity church" located at Mons Domini "Mountain of the Lord." The current Trinity church in Uppsala was founded in the late 13th century and is not old enough to be the church where Erik was slain. Scholars have discussed different locations for the older Trinity church, but the presence of pre-cathedral graves in the vicinity of the cathedral might suggest that the original Trinity church was located at the same spot as the cathedral.

In an effort to elucidate this early history of the cathedral and Mons Domini, archaeologist Magnus Alkarp examined a large part of the cathedral floor with ground-penetrating radar (GPR) in 2005. The results from this investigation confirmed the existence of an older building beneath the cathedral, which includes details corresponding with known 12th-century Romanesque churches. The GPR work likely confirmed the historicity of a Trinity church building that once stood on the site of the cathedral.

== Notes ==
Erik the Saint House of Erik Born: 1120 Died: 18 May 1160
Regnal titles
Preceded by Sverker the Elder	King of Sweden; 1156–1160	Succeeded by Magnus Henriksson
