= Bjørn Haraldsen Ironside =

Swedish king

- Died: 1134; Near Schleswig
- Spouse: Katarina Ingesdotter
- Issue: Christina of Denmark, Queen of Sweden
- House: Estridsen
- Father: Harald Kesja
- Mother: Ragnild Magnusdatter of Norway

Bjørn Haraldsen Ironside (Bjørn Jærnside; died 1134) was a Danish prince.

Bjørn was one of the 15 sons of Prince Harald Kesja. His mother was Ragnild Magnusdatter. Bjørn married Princess Katarina Ingesdotter of Sweden, the daughter of King Inge I of Sweden. Bjørn was the father of Christina Bjornsdatter, a Swedish queen.

Bjørn accidentally drowned with his brother Eric in 1134 near Schleswig.
