= Christina of Denmark, Queen of Sweden =

Queen of Sweden from 1156 to 1160

Christina of Denmark

Queen consort of Sweden
- Tenure: 1156–1160
- Born: c. 1120/25
- Died: c. 1160/70
- Spouse: Saint Erik
- Issue: Knut, King of Sweden; Filip Eriksson; Katarina Eriksdotter; Margaret, Queen of Norway
Names
- Christina Björnsdotter
- House: Estridsen
- Father: Björn Haraldsen Ironside
- Mother: Katarina Ingesdotter

Christina of Denmark (Danish: Kirstine Bjørnsdatter, Swedish: Kristina Björnsdotter; c. 1120/25 – c. 1160/70), was Queen of Sweden as the wife of King Erik the Saint (r. 1156–1160), and the mother of King Knut Eriksson.

== Life ==
According to the Knýtlinga saga, Christina was the daughter of Bjørn Haraldsen Ironside, son of the Danish prince Harald Kesja, and his consort, the Swedish princess Katarina Ingesdotter, daughter of King Inge I of Sweden. It has been calculated that she was born no earlier than c. 1122, which fits with the approximate birthdate of her future husband Erik (c. 1120–25). She was made fatherless in 1134, when her father Prince Björn was murdered by order of his uncle, King Eric II of Denmark. Her sole surviving close relative, Björn's brother Oluf Haraldsen, sought assistance in Sweden and was able to set himself up as king in Skåne in 1140–1143.

In about the same time Christina married in Sweden with a man of non-royal origins, Erik Jedvardsson, later known as Saint Erik. He probably came from the province of Västergötland which bordered to Denmark. Since their son Knut was betrothed by 1160, the marriage of Christina and Erik probably took place in the early 1140s. The marriage gave Erik the means to claim the Swedish throne; the House of Stenkil, to which Christina belonged on her mother's side, became extinct in the male line in the 1120s. The new king Sverker I did not have royal forebears. According to later tradition, Erik took royal titles in 1150. Six years later, he became king after the assassination of Sverker, and Christina became the Queen of Sweden. Her queenship probably lasted for four years, from 1156 to 1160.

=== Queen ===
Queen Christina became notable for her conflict with Varnhem Abbey, Västergötland. She was in dispute with the monks about the ownership to the land upon which the convent had been founded, as she considered it as an inheritance after her relative, lady Sigrid. She is claimed to have harassed the monks: a chronicle accuses her of sending women into the convent to dance naked before the monks. This forced the monks to leave the country and seek refuge in Denmark, where they founded Vitskøl Abbey (1158), a conflict for which the pope contemplated to have her excommunicated. After this, however, Christina and Erik became increasingly well-disposed to the Varnhem monks, who were able to return and reorganize monastic life.

=== Later life ===
There is no explicit mention of Queen Christina after the events in c. 1158. If still alive, she was widowed at the murder of the King outside the cathedral in Uppsala in 1160. Her son and his followers may have fled with Christina, with the crowned head of her husband in their possession. Perhaps she spent the following years in Denmark where her kinsman Valdemar the Great ruled.

In 1167, her son Knut was made king. He promoted the veneration of Erik as a saint. It has been guessed that Queen Dowager Christina died in the beginning of Knut's reign, around 1170, but neither the date of her birth or death is actually known.

== Issue ==
1. Knut Eriksson, King of Sweden 1167–1196.
2. Filip Eriksson
3. Katarina Eriksdotter, married to Nils Blake.
4. Margareta Eriksdotter, married in 1185 Sverre I of Norway, died in 1202.

== Notes ==
Christina of Denmark, Queen of Sweden House of Estridsen Born: 1120s Died: 1170
Swedish royalty
Preceded by Rikissa of Poland	Queen consort of Sweden; 1156–1160	Succeeded by Brigida Haraldsdotter
