= Blotstulka =

Swedish legendary queen

Blotstulka, or Blot-Tulca, (11th century) is a name known in legend for an alleged Swedish medieval queen consort, spouse of a King "Blot-Sweyn" of Sweden who may have reigned in the 1080s. The name can be seen as the equivalent to that of her spouse, with the meaning: "The Woman Sacrificer" or "The Maiden Sacrificer"; as her spouse's name was "Sweyn the Sacrificer", which can also be translated as "The Man Who Performs the Sacrifices".

== Biography ==
Not much is known about the queen and the dates of her birth and death are unknown. She is the possible mother of an alleged son of Blot-Sweyn, Erik Årsäll. She was married to Sweyn before he became king and was alive to be queen during his reign. She is the last known Pagan queen in Sweden and in Scandinavia. She became queen of Sweden when her spouse ascended to the throne. About 1087 her husband was deposed and killed; according to tradition, by being surrounded in his home, which was set on fire. No murder of a female is recorded, and it was also the custom to allow the women of the household to depart from the building in such a situation. The queen is therefore expected to have survived the death of her spouse. The above is related from legend. Nothing factual about her life is known.
