= Viklau Church =

- Viklau kyrka
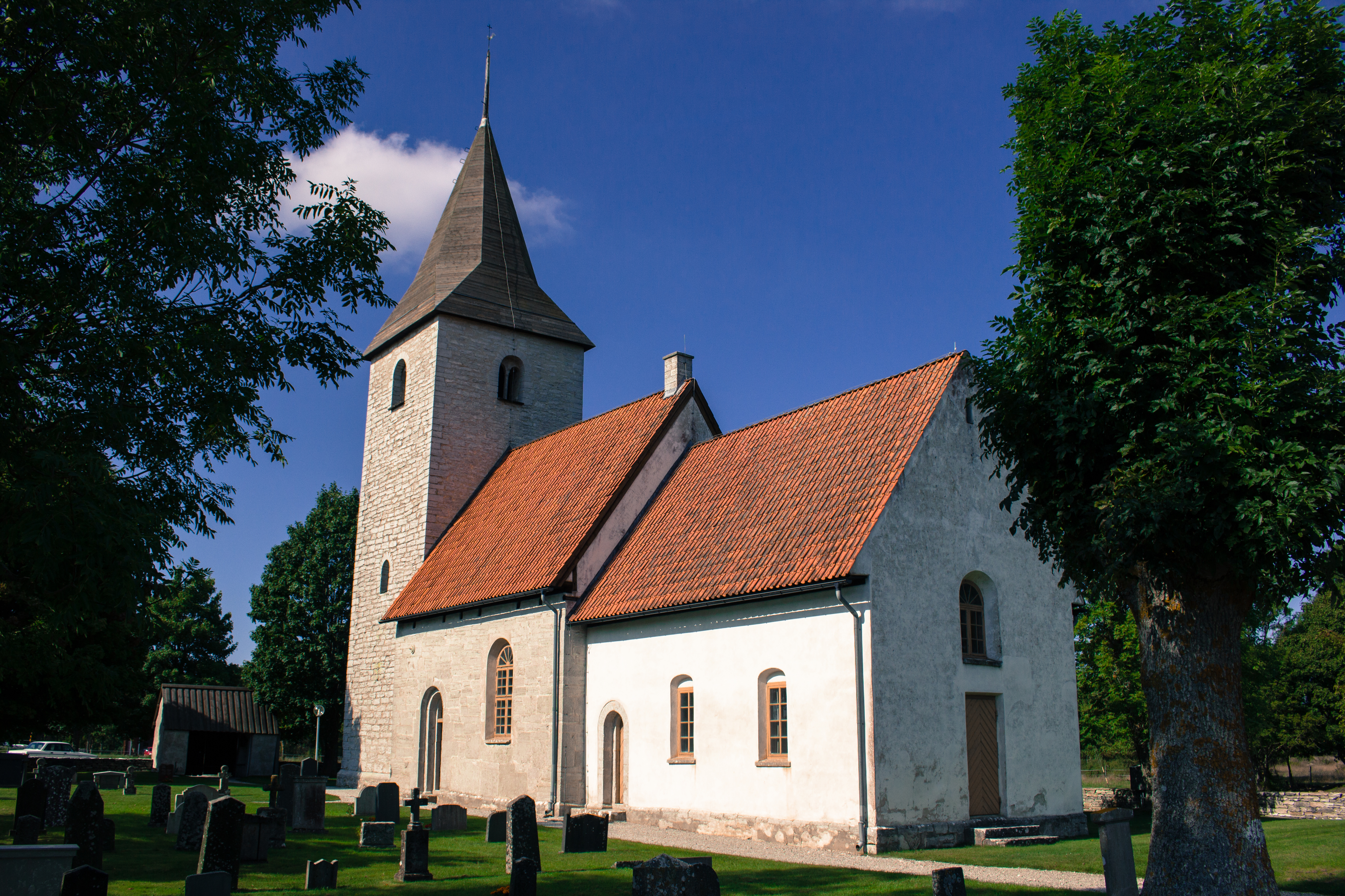
- Viklau Church

- Location on Gotland
- 57°27′56″N 18°27′23″E
- Country: Sweden
- Denomination: Church of Sweden

Administration
- Diocese: Visby

Viklau Church (Swedish: Viklau kyrka) is a medieval church on Gotland, Sweden. It is a well-preserved Romanesque church in which several medieval items have been preserved. The most famous of these is the Viklau Madonna, today housed in the Swedish History Museum in Stockholm.

== History and architecture ==
Viklau Church is a well-preserved Romanesque church. The oldest part is the chancel. The nave was built slightly later than the chancel, but both are from the 12th century. The chancel was somewhat altered in the 19th century. In the middle of the 13th century the tower was erected. The church is rather plain, both the exterior and the interior. The nave has a flat wooden ceiling. A number of medieval furnishings have been preserved in the church. The most well-known is probably the so-called Viklau Madonna, a well-preserved Romanesque wooden sculpture depicting Saint Mary. It is today on display at the Swedish History Museum in Stockholm, but a copy has been made for the church. It dates from the late 12th century. From the same time is also the rood cross, which however was probably made by another workshop. Also the decorated baptismal font of sandstone is from the same time period. It has been ascribed to the stone sculptor known as Hegvald. The reliefs on its sides depict scenes from the life of Mary, the story of Lazarus and scenes from the childhood of Christ. Most of the other furnishings of the church are from the 18th century.

== Sources cited ==
- Jacobsson, Britta; Johansson, Eva; Johansson, Per; Andersson, Rolf (1990). Våra kyrkor [Our churches]. Västervik: Klarkullens förlag AB. ISBN 91-971561-08.
- Lagerlöf, Erland; Svahnström, Gunnar (1991). Gotlands kyrkor [Churches of Gotland] (in Swedish) (4th ed.). Stockholm: Rabén & Sjögren. ISBN 91-29-61598-4.
