= Nils Blake =

12th-century Swedish magnate

Nils Blake (fl. 12th century) was a Scandinavian, probably Swedish nobleman. Although his life is not known in any detail, he had a dynastic importance within the ruling families of Sweden and Norway.

Nils Blake, also known as Nils or Nikolas Blaka, married Katarina Eriksdotter, a daughter of the Swedish king Erik the Saint, probably after Erik's violent fall in 1160. Some older historians assumed that he was a Norwegian lord, son of the grandee Simon Skalp and King Harald Gille's daughter, but this has been disproven. The daughter of Nils and Katarina, Kristina Nilsdotter, is known as "Kristina the Swedish" or "the Swedish lady" in Norwegian sources, implying that Nils was a Swede, too. Kristina was married to Jarl Håkon Galen in January 1205, presumably in the presence of her cousin Erik Knutsson, who sought and received Norwegian support to gain the throne of Sweden. Since Kristina Nilsdotter later returned to Västergötland and remarried there, Nils Blake may have owned land in this province.

== Literature ==
- Kjellberg, Carl M. (1888). "Erik den heliges ättlingar". Historisk tidskrift. 8.
- Munch, P.A. (1857). Det norske Folks historie. Vol. III. Christiania: Tonsbergs.
