= Viklau Madonna =

12th-century wooden statuette

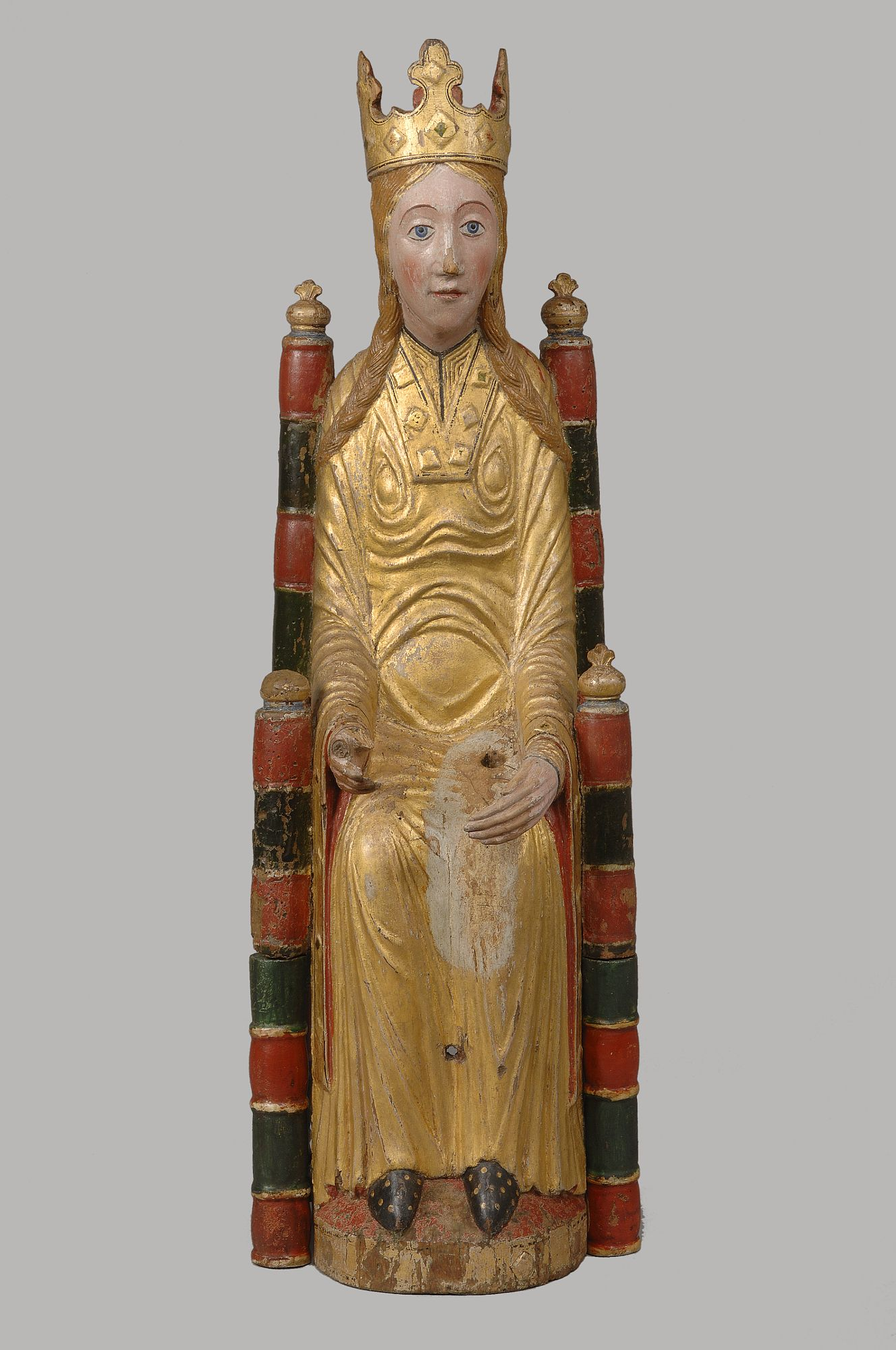
The Viklau Madonna

The Viklau Madonna (Swedish: Viklaumadonnan) is a late 12th-century wooden Madonna, probably made on Gotland in present-day Sweden. The statuette is one of the best-preserved 12th-century wooden statuettes from Europe. Named after the medieval Viklau Church where it was originally located, it was bought by the Swedish History Museum in 1928 and is today in the museum in Stockholm. In 2017, it was discovered that a relic had been placed inside the statuette. The statuette depicts Mary, wearing gilded clothes and a golden crown, sitting on a tall chair. Originally, the Madonna was depicted holding the infant Christ in her arms, but this part of the sculpture has been lost.

== Description ==
The Viklau Madonna is a wooden sculpture depicting Mary sitting on a tall chair. She is sitting with a straight back and with her body weight evenly distributed. Originally she held the Christ Child in her lap, but this part of the sculpture has been lost. The statuette is 680 millimetres (27 in) tall. The material is mainly linden wood, but other types of wood have also been used. The rich gilding of the clothes and crown of Mary contrasts with the more subdued colours of the chair and the delicate features of her face. The posts of the chair have been shaped by a lathe and are painted in alternating red and green bands. Apart from gold leaf, the crown and dress of the Madonna are also adorned with imitations of gemstones, made by a mixture of adhesive and lime. In 2017, a hole in the head of the Madonna was found to contain a small linen bag in which a piece of bone lay, implying a relic. That the Madonna was used as a reliquary is unusual; sculptures of Mary did usually not house relics and relics were typically placed in the chest of sculptures during the Middle Ages. Radiocarbon dating indicates that the bone piece found in the Madonna is approximately 3,500 years old. The back of the statuette is flat, indicating that it originally was placed in and framed by a shallow cabinet – like all preserved Madonnas from this time from Sweden. Its relatively small size implies that it may have been made to be easily moved and used in several different locations.

Stylistically, the Viklau Madonna has several times been compared with the sculptures decorating the portals of Chartres Cathedral in France (it has even been suggested that the Viklau Madonna was produced at the cathedral workshop in Chartres). However, it has also been noted that the stylistic traits that these sculptures have in common can be observed over a large geographical area, and the link between Chartres and Viklau has in more recent years been played down. Recent research has instead noted similarities with art from northern or western Germany. It has been described as being an early example of Gothic art, but also as one of the most characteristic examples of Romanesque art. Art historian Lennart Karlsson argued that whether the sculpture should be classified as Romanesque or Gothic is an "academic" question. It is one of the best-preserved European wooden sculptures from the 12th century.

== History ==
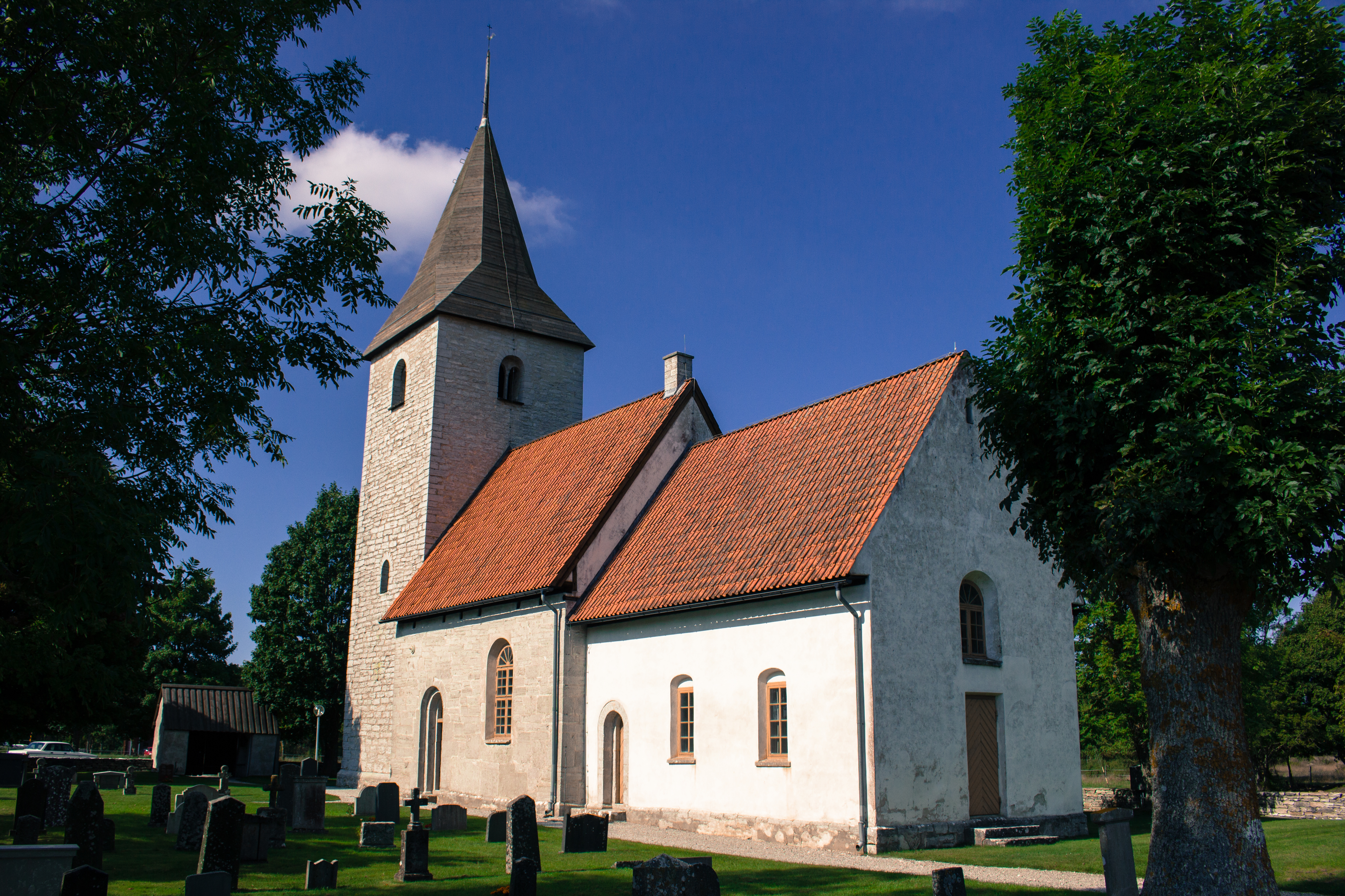
Viklau Church on Gotland, where the sculpture was before being bought by the Swedish History Museum in 1928

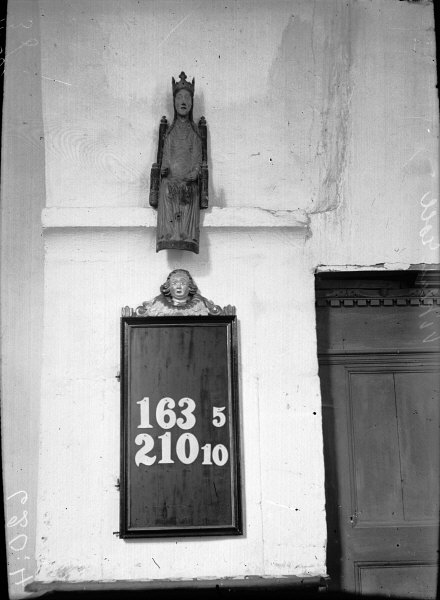
The statue in Viklau Church in 1914

The identity of the artist who made the Viklau Madonna is not known. Several theories have been put forward, as the Madonna from Viklau has attracted more attention than any other depiction of Mary from the Romanesque era in Sweden. Johnny Roosval was the first art historian who wrote about the Viklau Madonna. Early theories proposed, as mentioned above, that the sculpture was connected to or even made by the cathedral workshop in Chartres. Johnny Roosval thought the Madonna may have come to Gotland via the French monks who settled in Roma Abbey. This conclusion, which has later been described as "surprising", may have derived from a desire among earlier art historians to tie the Madonna and other works of art from Gotland as closely as possible to the great works of art of Western Europe. By examining the paint and wood of the sculpture, as well as through stylistic comparisons, researchers have however been able to draw the conclusion that the sculpture was almost certainly made in a workshop on Gotland during the last quarter of the 12th century (some sources mention the time 1170–80). Furthermore, it has been connected on both stylistic and technical grounds with a group of wooden sculptures from Gotland, and the rood crosses in the churches of Alskog, Hemse and Väte, among others, were very probably made in the same workshop.

The Madonna originally belonged to Viklau Church on Gotland, for which it is named. When it was installed in the church is not known. The relic within the sculpture is probably not original; the linen used to wrap the relic dates from around 1250. In 1928, the church sold the sculpture to the Swedish History Museum in Stockholm for 5,000 crowns. The sale of the sculpture gave rise to a discussion about the museum's practice of buying up works of art from around Sweden. It remains part of the collections of the museum. At the time of the acquisition of the statuette, the museum made five copies. One of these, made of plaster, is on display in Viklau Church. Another is in Gotland Museum in Visby, and a third is in Copenhagen. The whereabouts of the last two copies is today unknown.

== Works cited ==
- Karlsson, Lennart (1995). "Träskulpturen" [Wooden sculpture]. In Karlsson, Lennart (ed.). Signums svenska konsthistoria. Den romanska konsten [Signum's history of Swedish art. Romanesque art] (in Swedish). Lund: Signum. pp. 229–281. ISBN 91-87896-23-0.
- Tångberg, Peter (1995). "Träskulpturens tekniker" [The techniques of wooden sculpture]. In Karlsson, Lennart (ed.). Signums svenska konsthistoria. Den romanska konsten [Signum's history of Swedish art. Romanesque art] (in Swedish). Lund: Signum. p. 291. ISBN 91-87896-23-0.
- Lagerlöf, Erland; Svahnström, Gunnar (1991). Gotlands kyrkor [Churches of Gotland] (in Swedish) (4th ed.). Stockholm: Rabén & Sjögren. ISBN 91-29-61598-4.
- Sonne de Torrens, Harriet (6 February 2012). "Viklau Madonna". Grove Art Online. Oxford University Press.
