= Margaret of Sweden, Queen of Norway =

Queen of Norway from 1189 to 1202

Margaret of Sweden

Queen consort of Norway
- Tenure: 1189–1202
- Born: circa 1155; Sweden
- Died: 1209 (age 53-54); Norway
- Spouse: Sverre of Norway
- Issue: Christina of Norway
- House: Erik
- Father: Saint Erik
- Mother: Christina Björnsdotter

Margaret of Sweden (Norwegian: Margrete Eriksdotter, Swedish: Margareta; c. 1155 – 1209) was Queen of Norway as the spouse of King Sverre of Norway.

== Biography ==
Margaret was the daughter of King Erik Jedvardsson "the Saint" and his Danish Queen Christina. In 1189, she married the Norwegian King Sverre. She is only sporadically mentioned in history during her tenure as queen; primarily in connection with an attempt by Nikolas Arnesson to become Bishop of Stavanger. In the sagas, Queen Margaret is portrayed as suspect and intrigant

She became a widow in 1202, returned to her native Sweden, and retired to her estates in Västergötland and Värmland. Departing Norway, she had to leave her daughter Kristina Sverresdotter behind against her will. She spent two years in Sweden and returned to Norway in 1204.

On 1 January 1204, two days after she had returned to Norway, her stepson, King Haakon III of Norway, died with obvious symptoms of poisoning. Margaret became a suspect of the crime, and one of her servants tried to prove her innocence in a trial by ordeal which failed. The servant was drowned and Margareta fled back to Sweden.

Margaret returned to Norway in 1209 for her daughter's wedding. Her daughter married co-regent Filip Simonsson, the Bagler party candidate to the throne of Norway. Margaret took part in the wedding. Immediately after the wedding she became ill, and died a few weeks later.

== In popular culture ==
Lia Boysen portrays a fictionalized Margaret in the 2016 film The Last King. Margaret is portrayed as having an affair with a fictional Bagler aristocrat and poisons Haakon in a conspiracy to become queen again.

Margrete Eriksdotter House of Erik Born: c. 1155 Died: 1209
Preceded by Estrid Bjørnsdotter	Queen Consort of Norway; 1189–1202	Succeeded by Margrete Skulesdatter
