= Varnhem Abbey =

Church and cloister ruins in Västergötland, Sweden

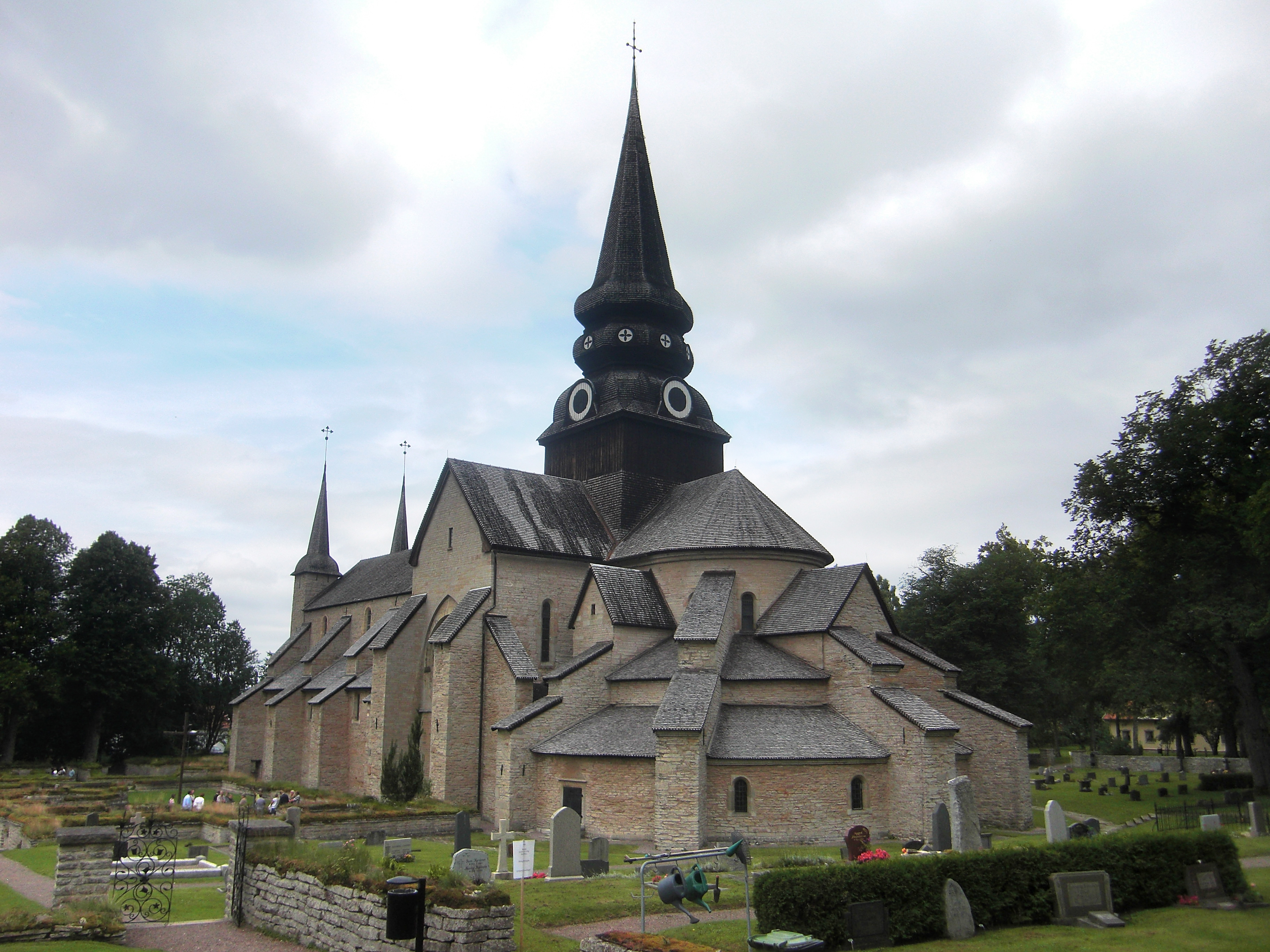
- Varnhem Abbey church, with ruins of the ancient abbey to the right.
- Interactive map of Varnhem Abbey

Monastery information
- Order: Cistercians

Site
- Location: Varnhem, Västra Götaland County, Sweden
- Coordinates: 58°23′03″N 13°39′15″E

Varnhem Abbey (Swedish: Varnhems kloster) in Varnhem, Västergötland, Sweden was founded around 1150 by monks of the Cistercian Order from Alvastra Abbey in Östergötland.

The Cistercian Order used the same floor plan for all its abbeys, which makes it possible to easily locate the different rooms and halls regardless of the building site.

== History ==
A wooden and a stone church were both erected on the site before the abbey was built. The stone church was erected in the 1040s at the latest, and is the oldest known stone church in Sweden (excluding Skåne). According to radiocarbon dating, the oldest Christian man buried there died in the period 780-970. From other radiocarbon evidence, the Christian burials seem to have begun during the 10th century.

A rich lady named Sigrid, probably a widow, donated the property to the cistercian monks, but the queen tried to revoke the donation and instead seize the property herself. The queen's attempts failed and the monks established the abbey in 1150. The Varnhem Abbey was sponsored by the House of Eric which in turn was granted burial privileges there. Three kings from the House of Eric lie buried in the abbey church: Canute I of Sweden, Eric X of Sweden and Eric XI of Sweden.

In 1234, the abbey was ruined by fire. The catastrophe led to a period of blooming, since Birger jarl and other mediaeval financiers rebuilt the abbey, this time more beautiful and imposing. The abbey church, which at first had been built in Romanesque style, was completed in Gothic style after the fire. In 1260 there was an opening ceremony for the church, which was the largest in Sweden at the time.

The abbey's property was confiscated in 1527 in accordance with the Reduction of Gustav I of Sweden, and the abbey buildings were burned by Danish forces 1566 during the Northern Seven Years' War. In the middle of the 17th century, Magnus Gabriel De la Gardie received the abbey as a gift from the Swedish queen Christina. De la Gardie restored the church and established a family mausoleum in it, while the remaining abbey buildings were left to decay. The church was thoroughly restored 1911–1923. Archeological excavations of the central part of the abbey were made 1921–1929, and again 1976 and 1977. In May 2002, the grave of Birger jarl was opened. The scientific analysis that followed, strengthened the belief that the three skeletons in the grave are the remains of Birger jarl, his son duke Eric Birgersson and Birger's wife Mechtild of Holstein.

Today, only the abbey church remains standing, surrounded by ruins. The number of tourists visiting Varnhem has grown manyfold due to Jan Guillou's books about Arn.

== Buried in Varnhem ==
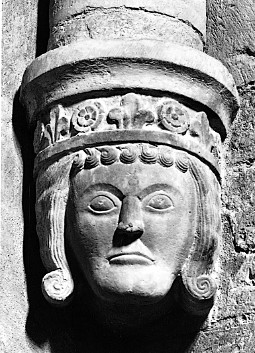
A corbel in the abbey church representing Duke Birger of Sweden (Birger jarl).

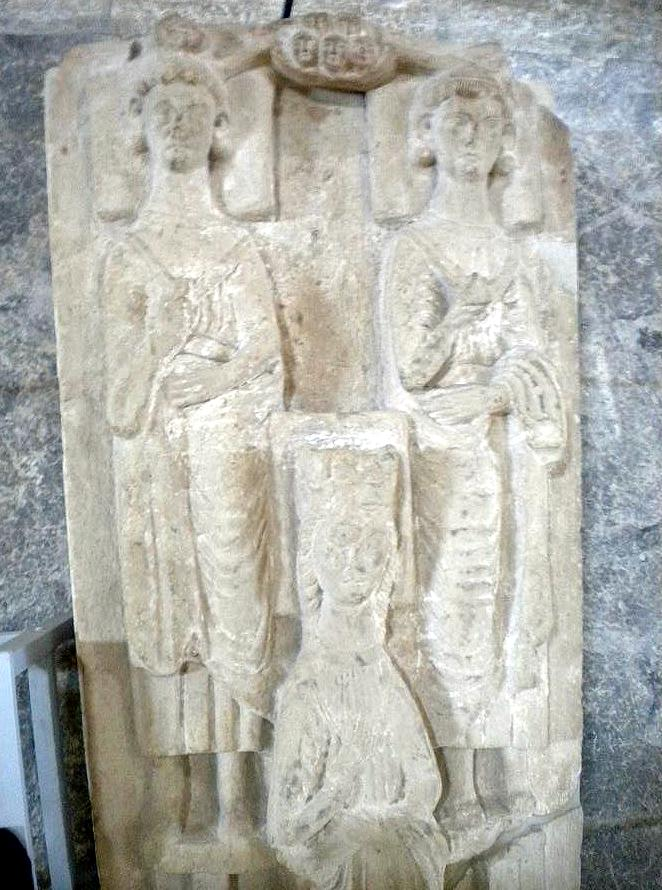
The grave of Birger jarl, his wife Matilda (Mechtild) and Birger's son Duke Eric

- Inge the Elder (oral tradition, if so moved later to Vreta Abbey)
- Canute I of Sweden
- Eric X of Sweden
- Eric XI of Sweden
- Birger Jarl, his wife, Dowager Queen Matilda of Denmark, and his son Eric Birgersson
- Björn Näf, knight, royal advisor, and teacher of Magnus Ladulås in the 13th century
- Magnus Gabriel De la Gardie, his wife Princess Maria Euphrosyne, their son Gustaf Adolf and Gustaf Adolf's wife Elisabeth Oxenstierna

== See also ==
- Axevalla House (castle ruins nearby)

== Literature ==
- Swedish National Heritage Board's registry of buildings Fornsök
