= Varnhem =

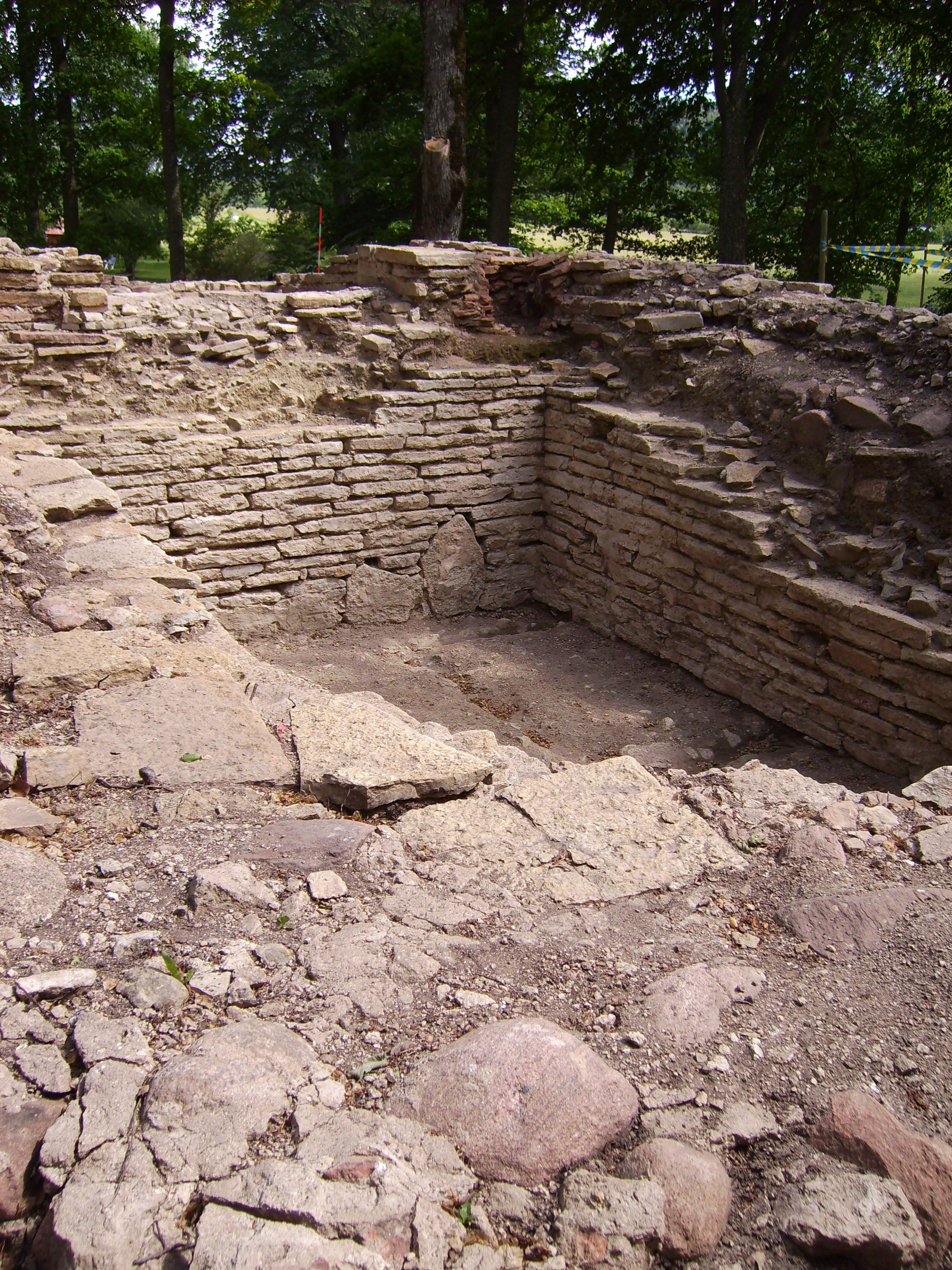
- The stone foundation of the old church of Varnhem, dated 1040 or earlier

- Location within Västra Götaland Location within Sweden
- Coordinates: 58°23′N 13°39′E
- Country: Sweden
- Province: Västergötland
- County: Västra Götaland County
- Municipality: Skara Municipality

Area
  - Total: 0.80 km^{2} (0.31 sq mi)

Population (31 December 2010)
  - Total: 707
  - Density: 889/km^{2} (2,300/sq mi)
- Time zone: UTC+1 (CET)
  - Summer (DST): UTC+2 (CEST)
- Climate: Dfb

Varnhem is a locality situated in Skara Municipality, Västra Götaland County, Sweden with 707 inhabitants in 2010.

Varnhem is the location of the oldest known stone church in Sweden outside of Scania (which is attributed to Dalby Church), erected in the 1040s at the latest. It is also the location of a Christian cemetery which was in use during the end of the ninth century.

The Cistercian Order established Varnhem Abbey around 1150, not far from the old church. A new abbey church was erected to replace the older church; the abbey church is still in use.

== The Varnhem humerus ==
The Varnhem humerus was discovered in the cloister aisle in 1928. It is believed to date to between 1260 and 1527, and it is noteworthy because it shows evidence of healing after being repaired with a cylinder made of copper sheeting. It is an example of apparently successful advanced surgery carried out in the Middle Ages.

== Notable people ==
Notable people that were born or lived in Varnhem include the following:

- Birger Jarl (c. 1210–1266), statesman, and his family, buried in Varnhem
- Anders Dahl (1751–1789), botanist, born in Varnhem
