= History of Norway =

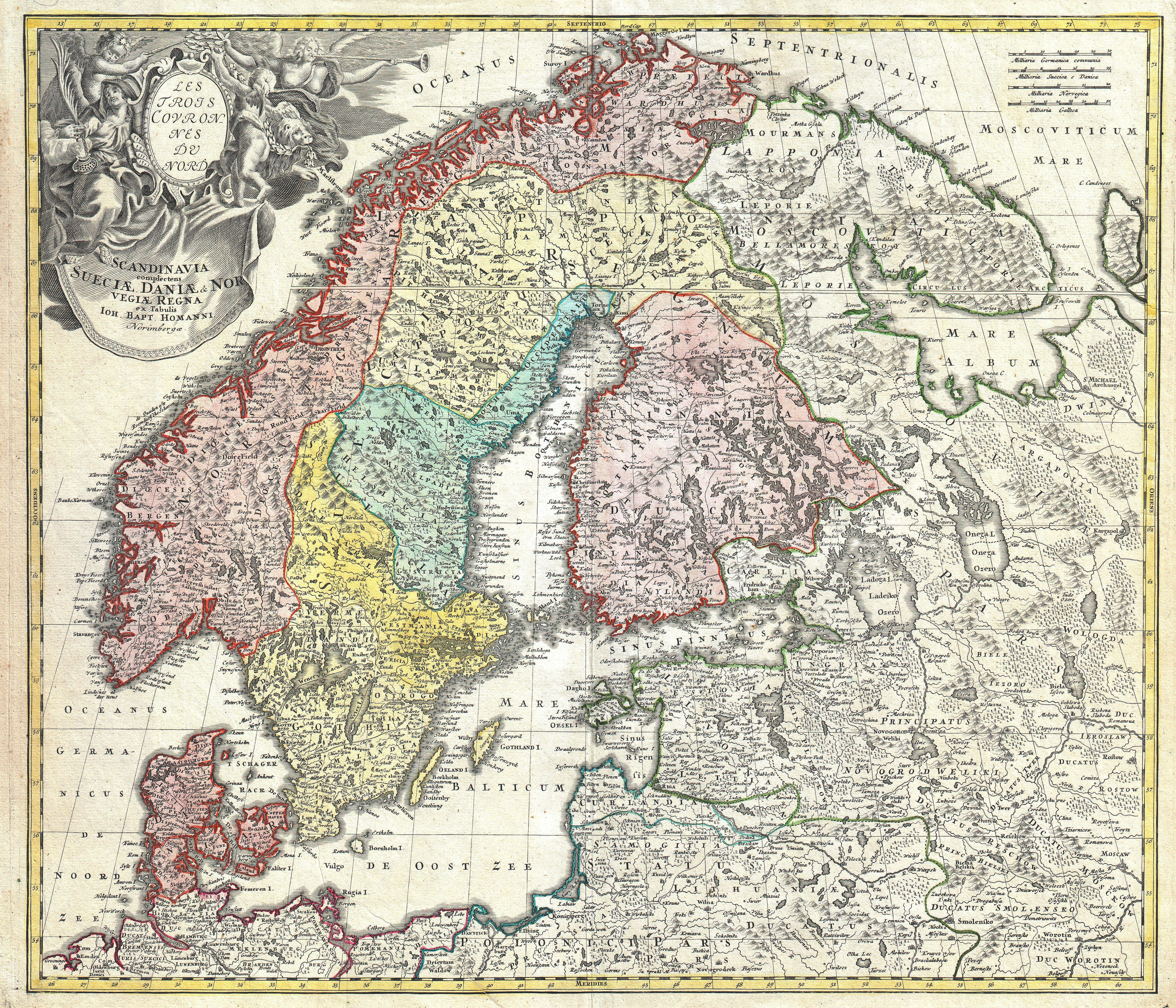
Homann's map of the Scandinavian Peninsula and Fennoscandia with their surrounding territories: northern Germany, northern Poland, the Baltic region, Livonia, Belarus, and parts of Northwest Russia. Johann Baptist Homann (1664–1724) was a German geographer and cartographer; map dated around 1730.

The history of Norway has been influenced to an extraordinary degree by the terrain and the climate of the region. About 10,000 BC, following the retreat inland of the great ice sheets, the earliest inhabitants migrated north into the territory which is now Norway. They traveled steadily northwards along the coastal areas, warmed by the Gulf Stream. They were hunter-gatherers whose diet included seafood and game, particularly reindeer as staple foods. Between 5,000 BC and 4,000 BC the earliest agricultural settlements appeared around the Oslofjord. Gradually, between 1,500 BC and 500 BC, agricultural settlements spread to entire south Norway, while the inhabitants of the regions north of Trøndelag continued to hunt and fish.

The Neolithic period started in 4,000 BC. The Migration Period caused the first chieftains to take control and hilltop forts to be constructed. From the 8th century Norwegians started expanding across the seas to the British Isles and later Iceland and Greenland. The Viking Age also saw the unification of the country. Christianization was completed during the 11th century and Nidaros became an archdiocese. The population expanded quickly until 1349 when it was halved by the Black Death and successive plagues. Bergen became the main trading port, controlled by the Hanseatic League. Norway entered the Kalmar Union with Denmark and Sweden in 1397.

After Sweden left the union in 1523, Norway became the junior partner in Denmark–Norway. The Reformation was introduced in 1537 and absolute monarchy imposed in 1661. In 1814, after being on the losing side of the Napoleonic Wars with Denmark, Norway was ceded to the king of Sweden by the Treaty of Kiel. Norway declared its independence and adopted a constitution. However, no foreign powers recognized the Norwegian independence but supported the Swedish demand for Norway to comply with the treaty of Kiel. After a short war with Sweden, the countries concluded the Convention of Moss, in which Norway accepted a personal union with Sweden, keeping its Constitution, Storting and separate institutions, except for the foreign service. The union was formally established after the extraordinary Storting adopted the necessary amendments to the Constitution and elected Charles XIII of Sweden as king of Norway on 4 November 1814.

Industrialization started in the 1840s, and from the 1860s large-scale emigration to North America took place. In 1884 the king appointed Johan Sverdrup as prime minister, thus establishing parliamentarism. The union with Sweden was dissolved in 1905. From the 1880s to the 1920s, Norwegians such as Fridtjof Nansen and Roald Amundsen carried out important polar expeditions. Shipping and hydroelectricity were important sources of income for the country. The following decades saw a fluctuating economy and the rise of the labor movement. Germany occupied Norway between 1940 and 1945 during the Second World War, after which Norway joined NATO and underwent a period of reconstruction under public planning. Oil was discovered in 1969 and by 1995 Norway was the world's second-largest exporter. This resulted in a large increase of wealth. From the 1980s Norway started deregulation in many sectors, and in 1989–1990 experienced a banking crisis.

By the 21st century, Norway became one of the world's most prosperous countries with oil and gas production accounting for 20 percent of its economy. By reinvesting its oil revenues, Norway had the world's largest sovereign wealth fund in 2017.

== Prehistory ==
Norway's coastline rose from glaciation with the end of the last glacial period about 12,000 BC. The first immigration took place during this period as the Norwegian coast offered rich opportunities for sealing, fishing, and hunting. These early inhabitants were nomadic, and by 9300 BC they were already settled as far north as Magerøya. Increased ice receding from 8000 BC led to settlement along the entire coastline. The Stone Age is evidenced by the Komsa culture in Troms and Finnmark and the Fosna culture further south. The Nøstvet culture took over from the Fosna culture ca. 7000 BC, when a warmer climate led to increased forestation and new species of mammals for hunting. The oldest human skeleton ever discovered in Norway was found in shallow water off Sogne in 1994 and has been carbon dated to 6600 BC. About 4000 BC people in the north started using slate tools, earthenware, skis, sleds and large skin boats.

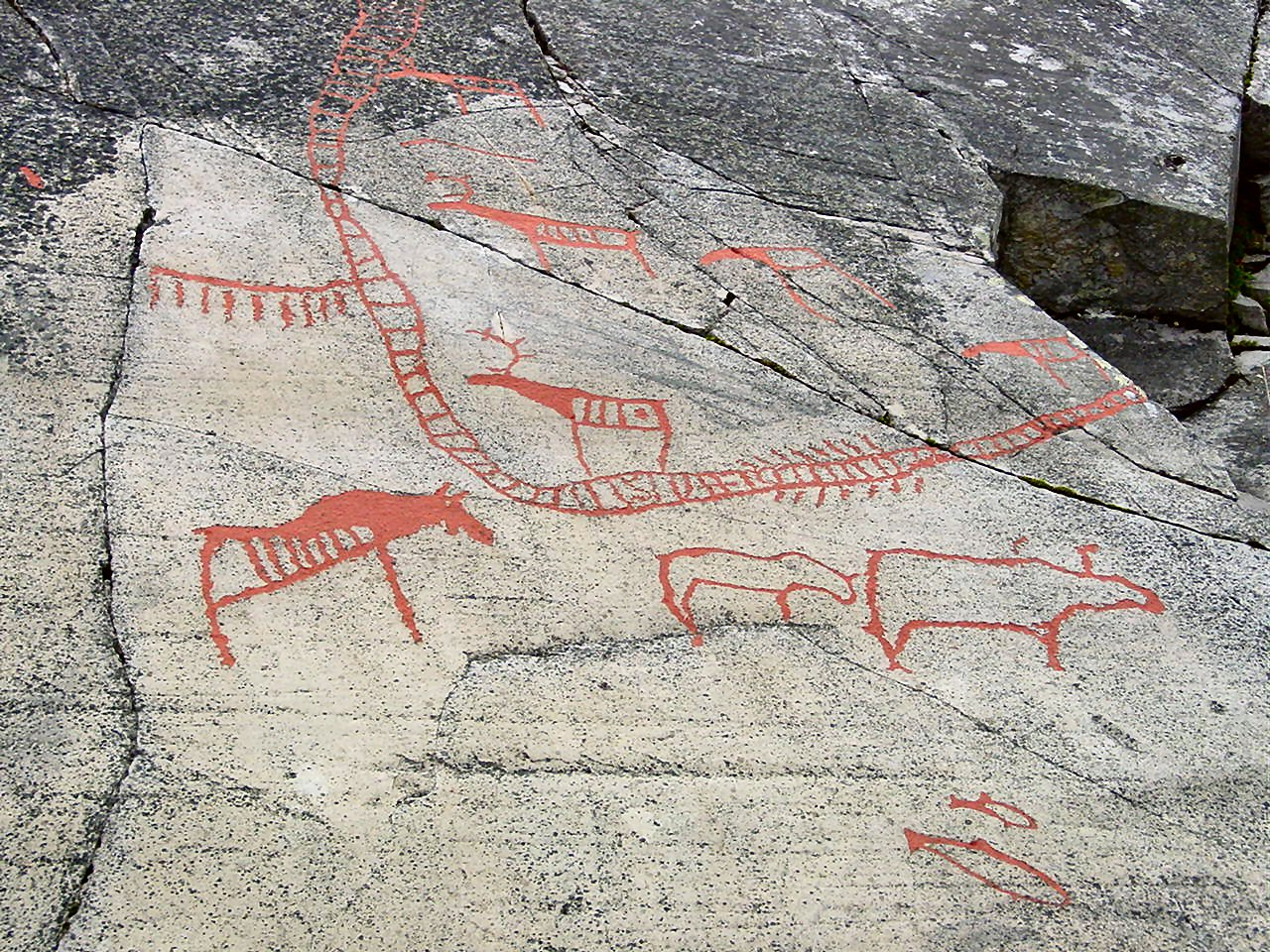
Rock carvings at Alta

The first farming, and thus the start of the Neolithic period, began ca. 4000 BC around the Oslofjord, with technology from southern Scandinavia. The break-through occurred between 2900 and 2500 BC, when oats, barley, pigs, cattle, sheep and goats became common and spread as far north as Alta. This period also saw the arrival of the Corded Ware culture, which brought new weapons, tools and an Indo-European dialect, from which later the Norwegian language developed.

=== Nordic Bronze Age (1800–500 BC) ===
The Bronze Age began around 1800 BC and involved innovations such as ploughing fields with ards, permanent farms with houses and yards, especially in the fertile areas around the Oslofjord, Trondheimsfjord, Mjøsa and Jæren. Some yields were so high that it allowed farmers to trade furs and skins for luxury items, especially with Jutland. About 1000 BC, speakers of Uralic languages arrived in the north and assimilated with the indigenous population, becoming the Sami people. According to Ante Aikio the formation of the Sámi language was completed in its southernmost area of usage (central Scandinavia, South Sápmi) by 500 AD.

A climate shift with colder weather started about 500 BC. The forests, which had previously consisted of elm, lime, ash and oak, were replaced with birch, pine and spruce. The climate changes also meant that farmers started building more solid structures for shelter. Knowledge of ironworking was introduced from the Celts, resulting in better weapons and tools.

=== Nordic Iron Age (500 BC–800 AD) ===
Iron Age tools allowed for more extensive clearing and farming, and thus more areas were cultivated as the population grew with the increased harvests. A new social structure evolved: when sons married, they would remain in the same house; such an extended family was a clan. They would offer protection from other clans; if conflicts arose, the issue would be decided at a thing, a sacred place where all free men from the surrounding area would assemble and could settle disputes and determine sanctions for crimes, such as paying fines in food.

The last century BC saw a widespread cultural development. The Norse adapted letters and created their own alphabet, runes. Trading with Romans also took place, largely furs and skins in exchange for luxury goods. Some Scandinavians also served as Roman mercenaries. Some of the most powerful farmers became chieftains. They functioned as priests and accepted sacrifices from farmers which were again used to pay soldiers, creating a hird. Thus they were able to rule an area of several clans and tribes.

The chieftains' power increased during the Migration Period between 400 and 550 as other Germanic tribes migrated northwards and local farmers wanted protection. This also resulted in the construction of simple fortifications. A plague hit southern Norway in the 6th century, with hundreds of farms being depopulated. Most were repopulated in the 7th century, which also saw the construction of several fishing hamlets and a boom in trade of iron and soapstone across the North Sea. Some chieftains were able to control most of the trade and grew in power throughout the 8th century.

=== Archaeological findings ===
In February 2020, Secrets of the Ice Program researchers discovered a 1,500-year-old Viking arrowhead dating back to the Germanic Iron Age and locked in a glacier in southern Norway caused by the climate change in the Jotunheimen Mountains. The arrowhead made of iron was revealed with its cracked wooden shaft and a feather, is 17 cm long and weighs just 28 grams.

== Viking Age ==
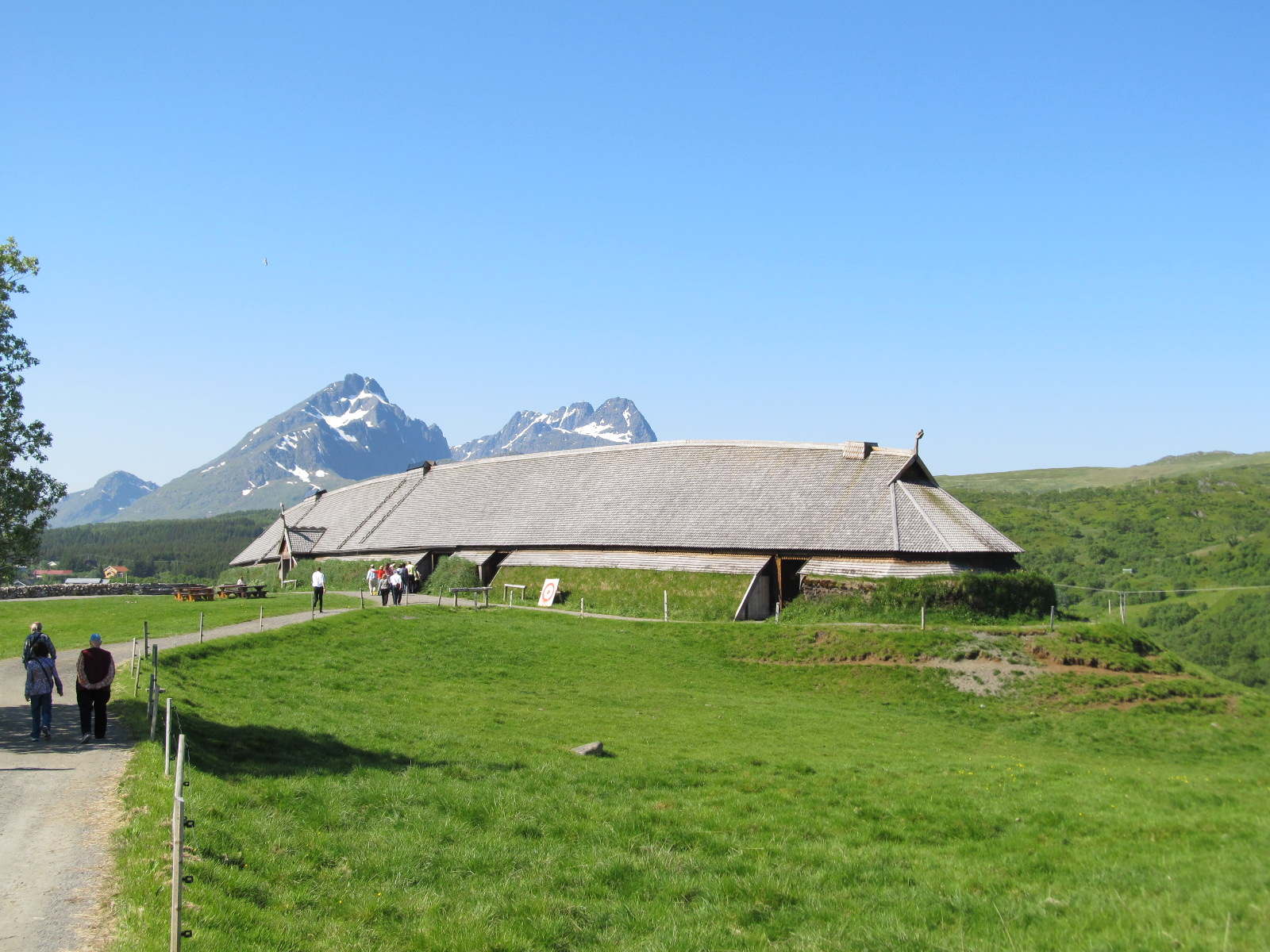
Reconstruction of a longhouse at Lofoten

The Viking Age was a period of Scandinavian expansion through trade, raids and colonization. One of the first raids was against Lindisfarne in 793 and is considered the beginning of the Viking Age. This was possible because of the development of the longship, suitable for travel across the sea, and advanced navigation techniques.

Vikings were well equipped, had chain mail armor, and were well trained. In addition to gold and silver, an important purpose from the raids was the capture and trading of thralls, which were brought to the Norwegian farms as a slave workforce. Whenever the men were engaged in warfare and voyages, the homestead was run by those remaining at home, supervised by the wife.

The lack of suitable farming land in Western Norway caused Norwegians to travel to and colonize sparsely populated areas of Shetland, Orkney, the Faroe Islands, the Hebrides and the Isle of Man the latter two of which became the Kingdom of the Isles. Norwegian Vikings settled on the east coast of Ireland circa 800 and founded the island's first cities, including Dublin. Their arrival caused the petty Gaelic kings to ally, and by 900 they had driven out the Norwegians.

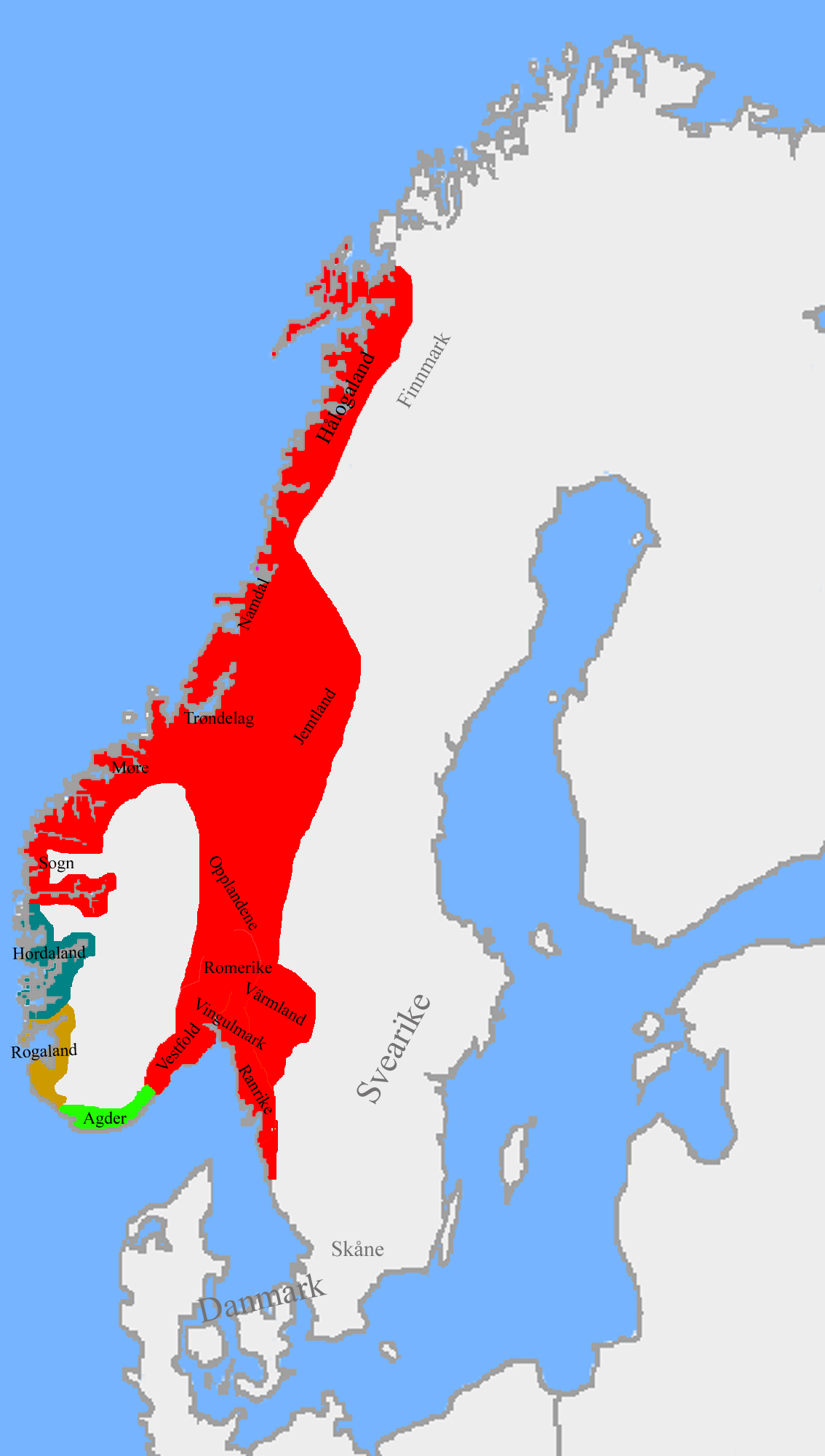
Petty kingdoms of Norway c. 872

The mid-9th century saw the largest chieftains of the petty kingdoms engaged in major power struggle. Harald Fairhair began the process of unifying Norway when he entered an alliance with the Earls of Lade and was able to unify the country after the decisive Battle of Hafrsfjord (circa 870–900). He set up the basics of a state administration with stewards seated at the most important estates of vanquished or exiled chieftains.

Iceland, then uninhabited, was discovered by Norwegians during the late 9th century. By 930 the island had been divided among 400 Norse chieftains.

Håkon the Good – the son of Harald Fairhair, raised in England – assumed the crown in 930 and established two large things, assemblies in which the king met with the free men to make decisions: Gulating for Western Norway and Frostating for Trøndelag. He also established the leidang, a mobilization army/navy. Haakon made an unsuccessful attempt to introduce Christianity in Norway. After his death in 960, war broke out between the Fairhair dynasty and the Earls of Lade in alliance with Danish kings.

Led by Erik the Red, a Norwegian-born man, a group of Icelanders settled on Greenland in the 980s. Erik's son, Leif Ericson, came across Newfoundland in ca. 1000, naming it Vinland. Unlike Greenland, no permanent settlement was established there.

=== Archaeological findings ===
Several Viking ships in burial mounds have been found and placed in museums, including the Oseberg and Gokstad ships. In October 2018, Norwegian archaeologists headed by the archaeologist Lars Gustavsen announced the discovery of a buried 20 m long Gjellestad Viking ship in Halden Municipality. An ancient well-preserved Viking cemetery for more than 1000 years was discovered using ground-penetrating radar. Archaeologists also revealed at least seven other previously unknown burial mounds and the remnants of five longhouses with the help of the radar survey.

== Middle Ages ==
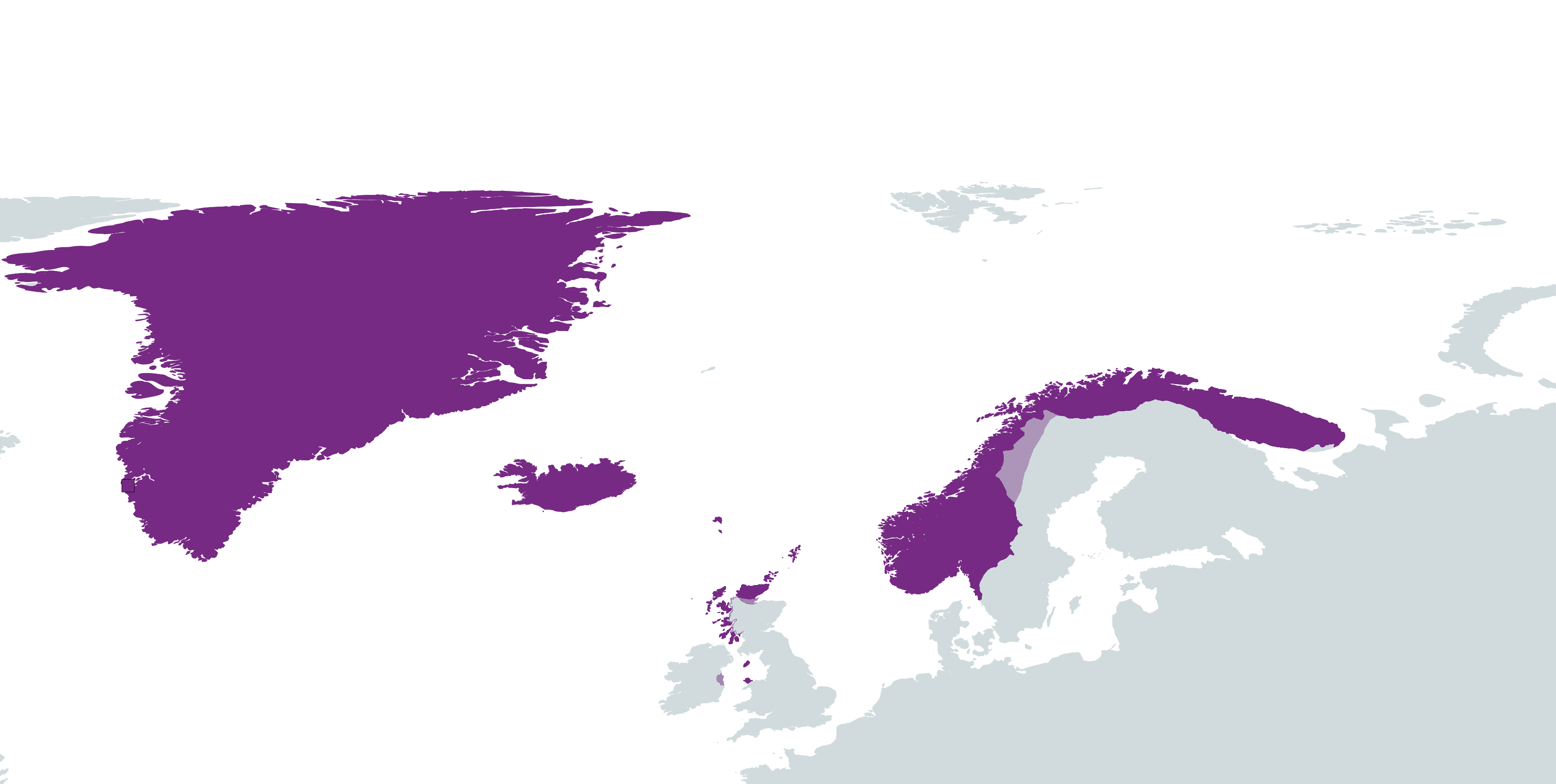
The Kingdom of Norway about 1265, at its greatest extent

Christianization and the abolition of the traditional paganism reflected in Norse mythology was first attempted by Håkon the Good, and later by Olav Tryggvason, but he was killed in the Battle of Svolder in 1000. Olav Haraldsson, starting in 1015, made the things pass church laws, destroyed heathen hofs, built churches and created an institution of priests. Many chieftains feared that Christianization would rob them of power as Goðar in traditional Norse paganism, and had Olaf banished from Norway in 1028. When he tried to return in 1030, he was met by the locals in the Battle of Stiklestad, where Olaf was killed, in accordance with the law. The church elevated Olaf I to sainthood, and Nidaros (today Trondheim) became the Christian centre of Norway. Within a few years the Danish rule had become sufficiently unpopular that Norway again united under a Norwegian king, Magnus Olavson the Good, in 1035.

From the 1040s to 1130 the country was at peace. In 1130, a civil war era broke out over succession to the throne, which allowed all the king's sons to rule jointly by dividing Norway into portions for each to rule. At times there were periods of peace, before a lesser son allied himself with a chieftain and started a new conflict. The Archdiocese of Nidaros was created in 1152 in an attempt to control the appointment of kings. The church inevitably took sides in these conflicts, with the church's influence on the king also becoming an issue in the civil wars. The wars ended in 1217 with the appointment of Håkon Håkonsson, who introduced clear succession laws. He also managed to subject Greenland and Iceland to Norwegian rule; the Icelandic Commonwealth thus came to an end after the Age of the Sturlungs civil war resulted in a pro-Norwegian victory.

The population increased from 150,000 in 1000 to 400,000 in 1300, resulting both in more land being cleared and the subdivision of farms. While in the Viking Age all farmers owned their own land, by 1300 seventy percent of the land was owned by the king, the church, or the aristocracy. This was a gradual process where farmers would borrow money in meagre times, often not being able to repay them. However, tenants always remained free men and the large distances and often scattered ownership meant that Norwegian farmers enjoyed much more freedom than continental serfs. In the 13th century about twenty percent of a farmer's yield went to the king, church and landowners.

=== Decline and the Kalmar Union ===
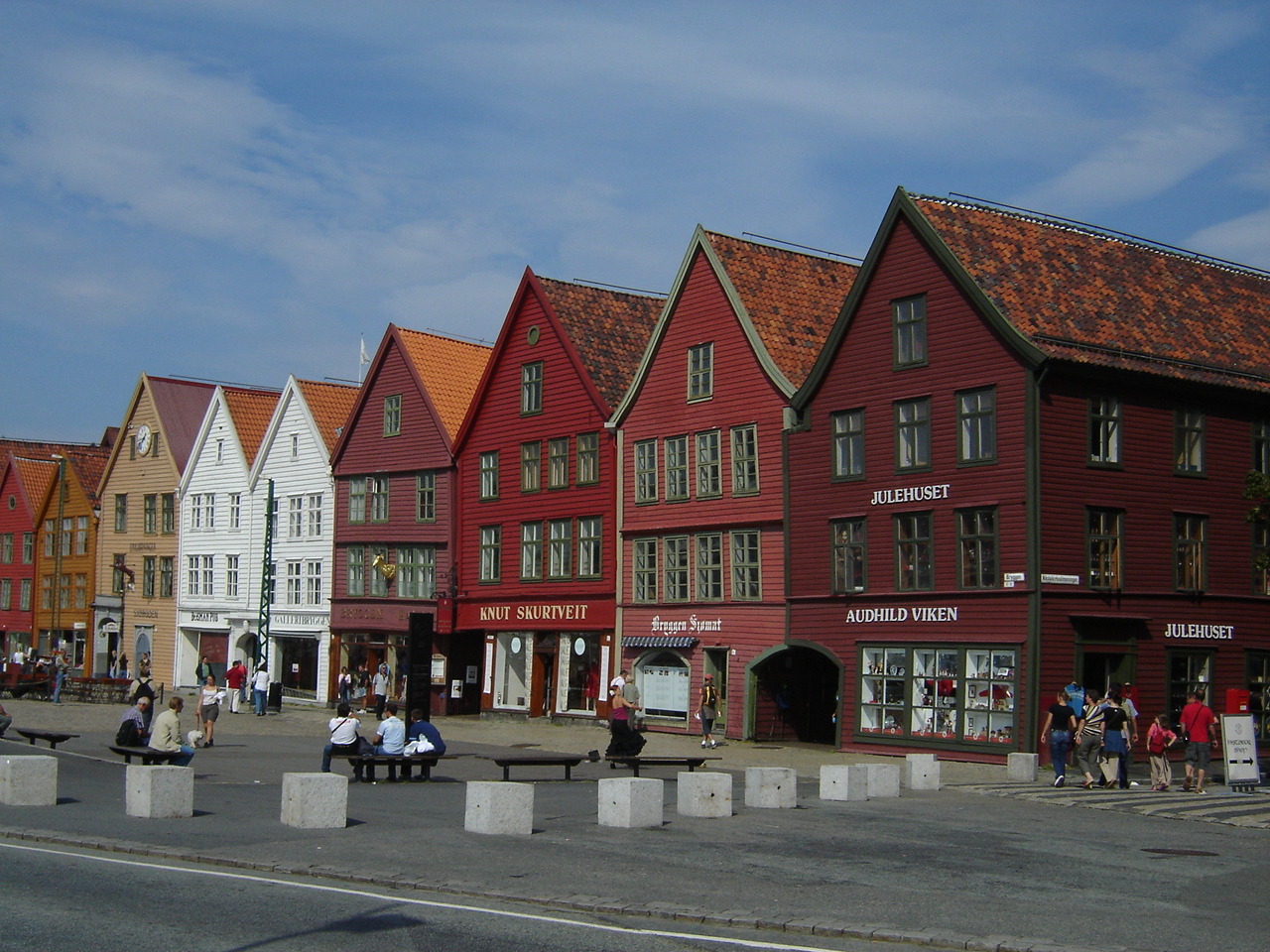
Bryggen in Bergen, once the centre of trade in Norway under the Hanseatic League trade network, now preserved as a World Heritage Site

The 13th century is described as Norway's Golden Age, with peace and increase in trade, especially with the British islands, although Germany became increasingly important towards the end of the century. Throughout the High Middle Ages the king established Norway as a sovereign state with a central administration and local representatives.

In 1349, the Black Death spread to Norway and within a year killed nearly two-thirds of the population. Later plagues halved the population by 1400. Many communities were entirely wiped out, resulting in an abundance of land, allowing farmers to switch to more animal husbandry. The reduction in taxes weakened the king's position, and many aristocrats lost their surplus income, reducing some to mere farmers. High tithes made the church more powerful, and the archbishop became a member of the Council of State.

The Kalmar Union, c. 1400

The Hanseatic League took control of Norwegian trade in the 14th century and established trading posts in most Norwegian port cities, such as Oslo and Bergen, which had the largest German colony. In 1380, Olaf Haakonsson inherited both the Norwegian and Danish thrones, creating a union between the two countries. In 1397, under Margaret I, the Kalmar Union was created between the three Scandinavian countries. She waged war against the Hanse, resulting in a trade blockade and higher taxation on Norwegians, which resulted in a rebellion. However, Norway and its Council of State was too weak to secede from the union.

Margaret pursued a centralising policy which inevitably favoured Denmark, because it had a greater population than Norway and Sweden combined. Margaret also granted trade privileges to the Hanseatic merchants of Lübeck in Bergen in return for recognition of her right to rule, and these hurt the Norwegian economy. The Hanseatic merchants formed a state within a state in Bergen for generations. Even worse were the pirates, the "Victual Brothers", who launched three devastating raids on the port (the last in 1427).

Norway slipped ever more into the background under the Oldenburg dynasty (established 1450). There was a revolt under Knut Alvsson in 1502. Norwegians had some affection for king Christian II, who resided in the country for several years. Norway did not take any part in the events which led to Sweden's secession from the Kalmar Union in the 1520s.

== Union with Denmark ==
Map of Denmark–Norway

Sweden was able to pull out of the Kalmar Union in 1523, thus creating Denmark–Norway under the rule of a king in Copenhagen. King Frederick I favoured Martin Luther's Reformation, but it was not popular in Norway, where the Church was the sole remaining national institution and the country was too poor for the clergy to be very corrupt. Initially, Frederick agreed not to try to introduce Protestantism to Norway but in 1529 he changed his mind. Norwegian resistance was led by Olav Engelbrektsson, Archbishop of Trondheim, who invited the old king Christian II back from his exile in the Netherlands. Christian returned but his army was defeated and he spent the rest of his life in prison.

=== The Puppet State era (lydriketiden) ===
When Frederick died and a three-way war of succession broke out between the supporters of his eldest son Christian (III), his younger Catholic brother Hans and the followers of Christian II. Olaf Engelbrektsson again tried to lead a Catholic Norwegian resistance movement. Christian III triumphed and Engelbrektsson went into exile and, in 1537, Christian demoted Norway from an independent kingdom to a puppet state, dissolving the Norwegian Council of State. The Reformation was also imposed in 1537, strengthening the king's power. All church valuables were sent to Copenhagen and the forty percent of the land which was owned by the church came under the control of the king. Danish was introduced as a written language, although Norwegian retained distinct dialects. Professional administration was now needed and power shifted from the provincial nobility to the royal administration: district stipendiary magistrates were appointed as judges and the sheriffs became employees of the crown rather than of the local nobility. In 1572 (or 1556), a viceroy was appointed for Norway with a seat at Akershus Fortress in Oslo. In 1628 the Norwegian Army was founded, and professional military officers were employed.

The Norwegian economy improved with the introduction of the water-driven saw in the early 16th century. Norway had huge resources of timber but did not have the means to exploit much of it in the Middle Ages as only hand-tools were available. The new saw mills which sprang up in the fjords changed this. In 1544 a deal was struck with the Netherlands (then part of the Holy Roman Empire) and the Dutch controlled the export of Norwegian timber for the next 150 years. Amsterdam was built on piles from Norway. Tree-felling was done in the winter when farm-work was impossible and it was easy to get the felled trees across the snow to the rivers. In the spring, the logs floated down the rivers to the saw mills by the sea. By the mid-16th century the power of the Hanseatic League in Bergen was broken; though German craftsmen remained, they had to accept Danish-Norwegian rule.

The 17th century saw a series of wars between Denmark–Norway and Sweden. The Kalmar War between 1611 and 1613 saw 8,000 Norwegian peasants conscripted. Despite lack of training, Denmark–Norway won and Sweden abandoned its claims to the land between Tysfjorden and Varangerfjord. With the Danish participation in the Thirty Years' War in 1618–48, a new conscription system was created in which the country was subdivided into 6,000 legd, each required to support one soldier. Denmark–Norway lost the war and was forced to cede Jämtland and Härjedalen to Sweden. The Second Northern War in 1657 to 1660 resulted in Bohuslän being ceded to Sweden.

=== The Absolute Monarchy era (enevoldstiden) ===
King Frederick III elevated himself to absolute and hereditary king of Denmark and Norway in 1661, eliminating the power of the nobles. A new administrative system was introduced. Departments organized by portfolio were established in Copenhagen, while Norway was divided into counties, each led by a district governor, and further subdivided into bailiwicks. About 1,600 government officials were appointed throughout the country. Ulrik Fredrik Gyldenløve was the most famous viceroy of Norway (1664–1699).

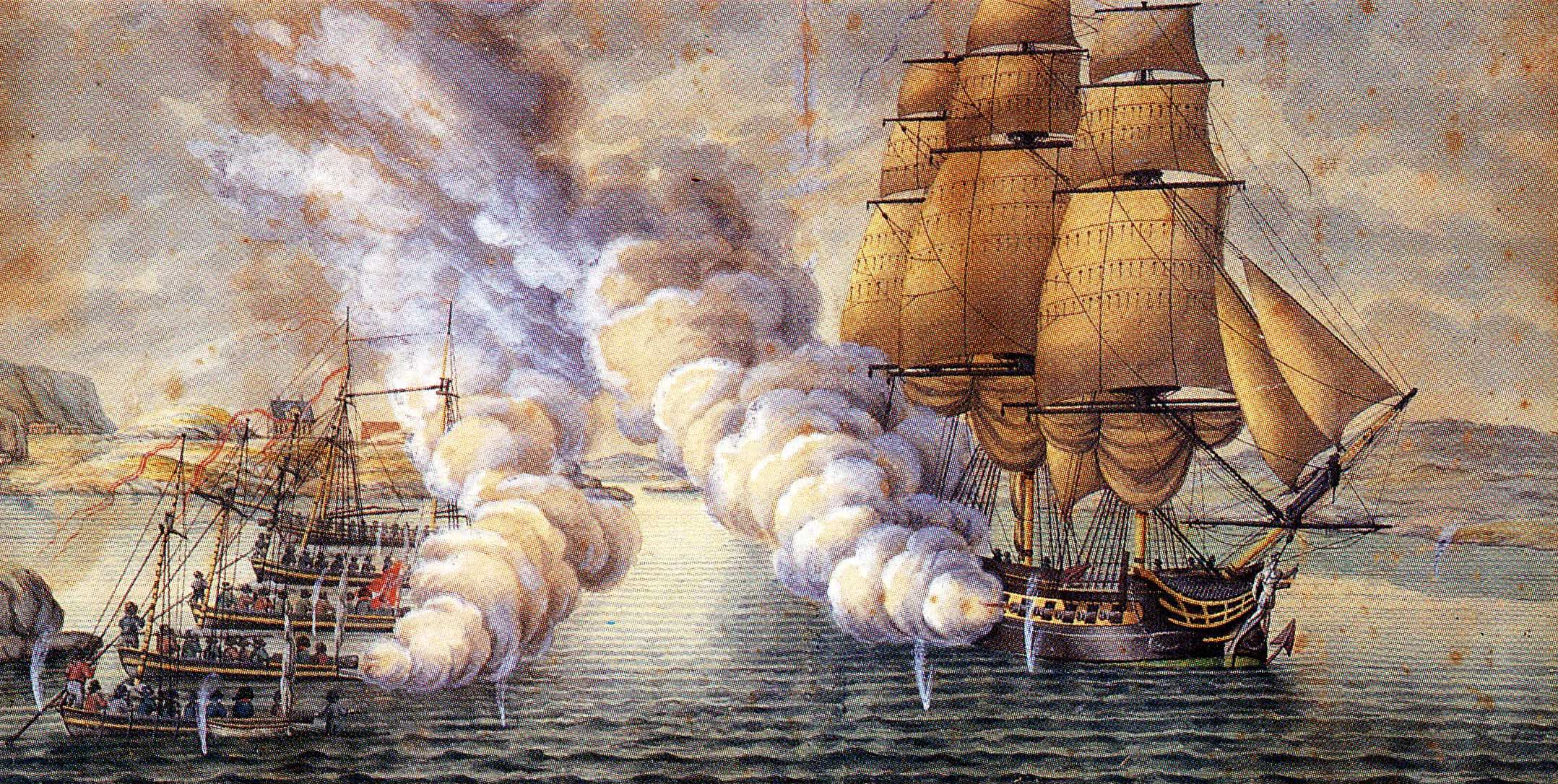
Battle of Alvøen between the frigate HMS Tartar and Norwegian gunboats near Bergen in 1808

The population of Norway increased from 150,000 in 1500 to 900,000 in 1800. By 1500 most deserted farms were repossessed. The period under absolutism increased the ratio of self-owning farmers from twenty to fifty percent, largely through sales of crown land to finance the lost wars. Crofts became common in the absolutism period, especially in Eastern Norway and Trøndelag, with the smallholder living at the mercy of the farmer. There were 48,000 smallholders in 1800. Compared to Denmark, taxes were very low in Norway, typically at four to ten percent of the harvest, although the number of farms per legd decreased from four to two in the 1670s. Confirmation was introduced in 1736; as it required people to read, elementary education was introduced.

The entire period saw mercantilism as the basis for commerce, which involved import regulations and tariffs, monopolies and privileges throughout the county granted to burghers. The lumber industry became important in the 17th century through exports especially to England. To avoid deforestation, a royal decree closed a large number of sawmills in 1688; because this mostly affected farmers with small mills, by the mid 18th century only a handful of merchants controlled the entire lumber industry. Mining increased in the 17th century, the largest being the silver mines in Kongsberg and the copper mines in Røros. Fishing continued to be an important income for farmers along the coast, but from the 18th century dried cod started being salted, which required fishermen to buy salt from merchants. The first important period of Norwegian shipping was between 1690 and 1710, but the advantage was lost with Denmark–Norway entering the Great Northern War in 1709. However, Norwegian shipping regained its strength towards the end of the century. Many Norwegians earned a living as sailors in foreign ships, especially Dutch ones. The crews in both sides of the Anglo-Dutch Wars contained Norwegians. Norway benefitted from the many European wars of the 18th century. As a neutral power it was able to expand its share of the shipping market. It also supplied timber to foreign navies.

Throughout the period, Bergen was the largest town in the country; its population of 14,000 in the mid 18th century was twice the size of Christiania (later Oslo) and Trondheim combined. Eight townships with privileges existed in 1660—by 1800 this had increased to twenty-three. During this period up to two-thirds of the country's audited national income was transferred to Copenhagen. In the last decades of the century, Hans Nielsen Hauge started the Haugean movement, which demanded the right to preach the word of God freely. The University of Oslo was established in 1811.

== Union with Sweden ==
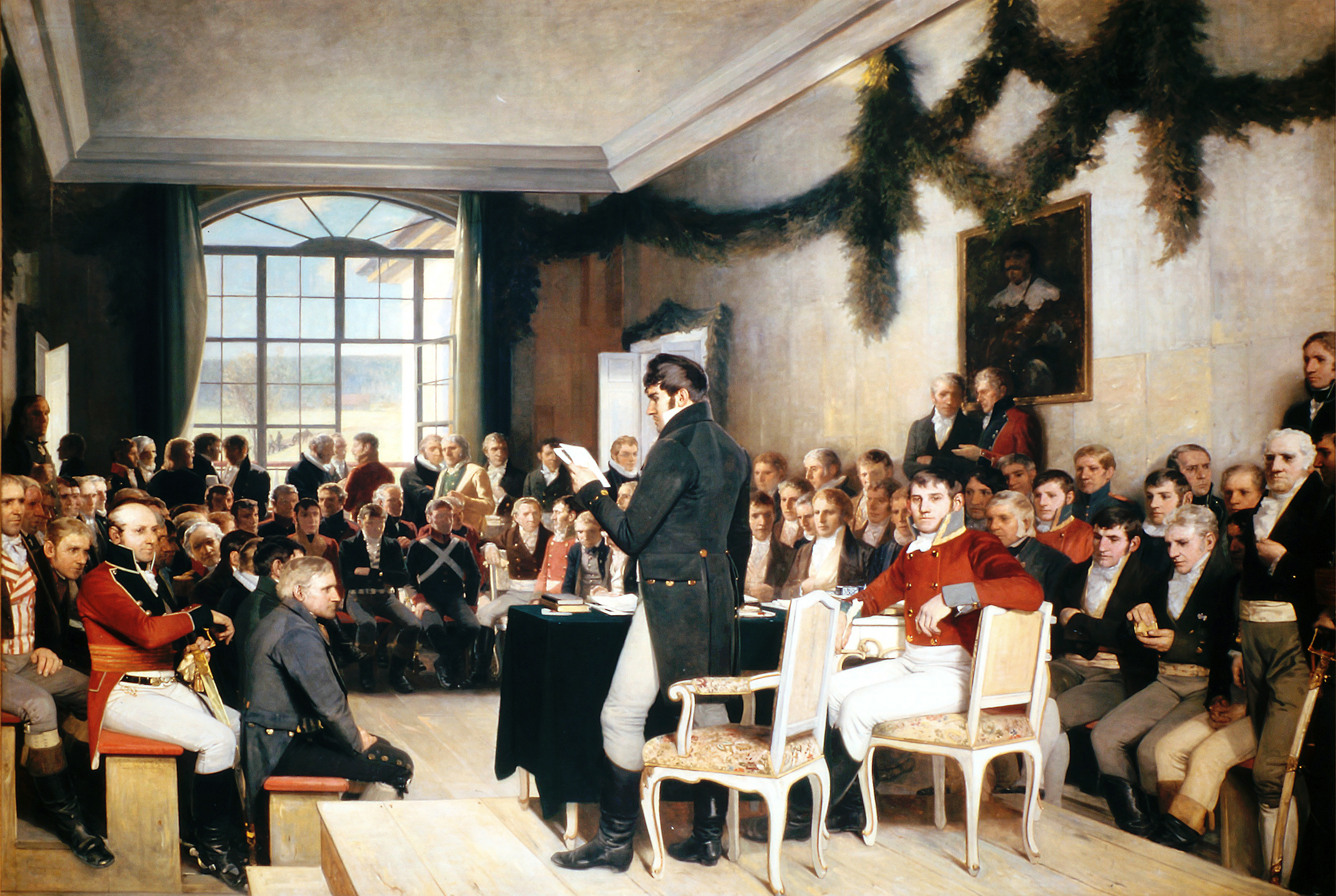
The Constituent Assembly which approved the Constitution of Norway

Denmark–Norway entered the Napoleonic Wars on France's side in 1807. This had a devastating effect on the Norwegian economy as the Royal Navy hindered export by ship and import of food. Sweden invaded Norway the following year, but after several Norwegian victories, a cease-fire was signed in 1809. Following the Battle of Leipzig in 1813, the Treaty of Kiel signed on 14 January 1814 ceded Norway to the king of Sweden.

Map of Sweden–Norway

Christian Frederik, heir to the Danish and Norwegian crowns, had since 1813 been viceroy of Norway. He spearheaded the Norwegian resistance against the Kiel Treaty and planned to claim the throne as the legitimate heir. He traveled to Trondheim to gain support for his person, and then assembled twenty-one prominent citizens at Eidsvoll Manor on 16 February 1814 to discuss his plans. They rejected a new absolute monarchy and advised him instead to convoke a constituent assembly to draw up a liberal constitution and decide the form of government. Representatives from the entire country were elected to meet at Eidsvoll Manor. The 112 members of the Constituent Assembly gathered and, after six weeks of discussion, concluded the work on the Constitution of Norway on 17 May 1814. Power would be split between the king – a position to which Christian Frederik was appointed – and the Parliament of Norway. The Swedish army under Crown prince Carl Johan of Sweden invaded Norway in late July; at the armistice Convention of Moss on 14 August Norway accepted to enter a personal union with Sweden on equal terms, while Sweden accepted the Norwegian Constitution and separate institutions in both states. King Christian Frederik agreed to convoke an extraordinary parliament to revise the Constitution accordingly, and then abdicate. The parliament was convened in Christiania on 7 October, and the necessary amendments were resolved on 4 November 1814. On the same day, king Charles XIII of Sweden was elected king of Norway, thereby establishing the Union.

=== The State of the Officials (embedsmannsstaten) ===
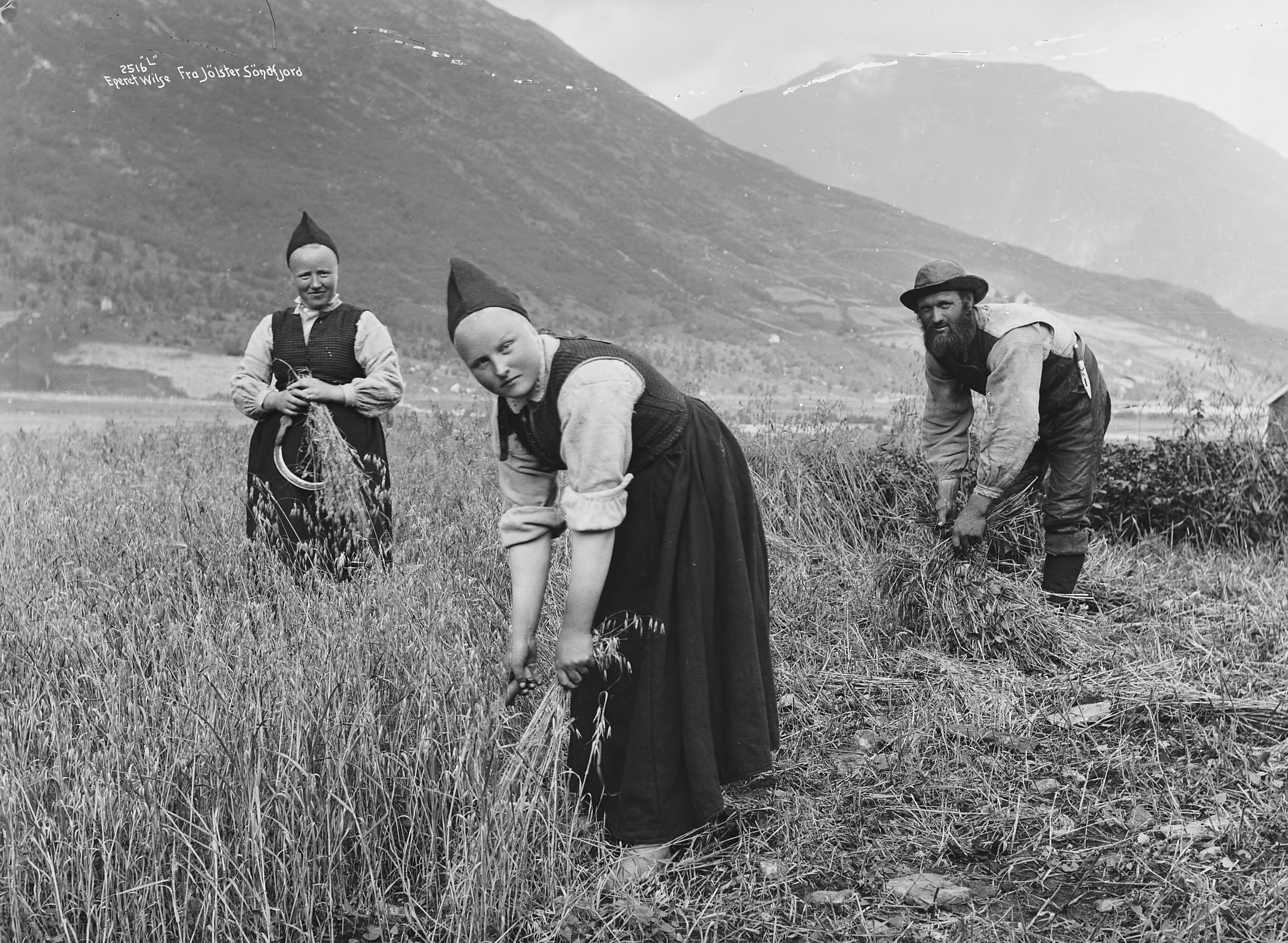
Harvesting oats at Fossum in Jølster Municipality during the 1880s

The Napoleonic Wars sent Norway into an economic crisis, as nearly all the merchants had gone bankrupt during the blockade. Recovery was difficult because of export tariffs and the country experienced high inflation. The Norwegian speciedaler was established as a currency by the Bank of Norway when it was established in 1816, financed through a silver tax which lasted until 1842. Under threat of a coup d'état by Carl Johan, Norway reluctantly paid the debt stated in the Treaty of Kiel, despite never having ratified it. Constitution Day on 17 May became an important political rally every year; in 1829 the Swedish governor-general Baltzar von Platen resigned after he used force against demonstrators in the Battle of the Square. The first half of the century was dominated by the ca. 2,000 officials, as there were few bourgeois and no aristocracy following an 1821 decision to abolish nobility. From the 1832 election, farmers became more conscious of electing themselves, resulting in a majority of farmers in Parliament. This resulted in rural tax cuts and higher import tariffs, shifting the tax burden to the cities. They also passed the Local Committees Act, which established elected municipal councils from 1838. Cultural expression from the 1840s to the 1870s was dominated by the romantic nationalism, which emphasized the uniqueness of Norway.

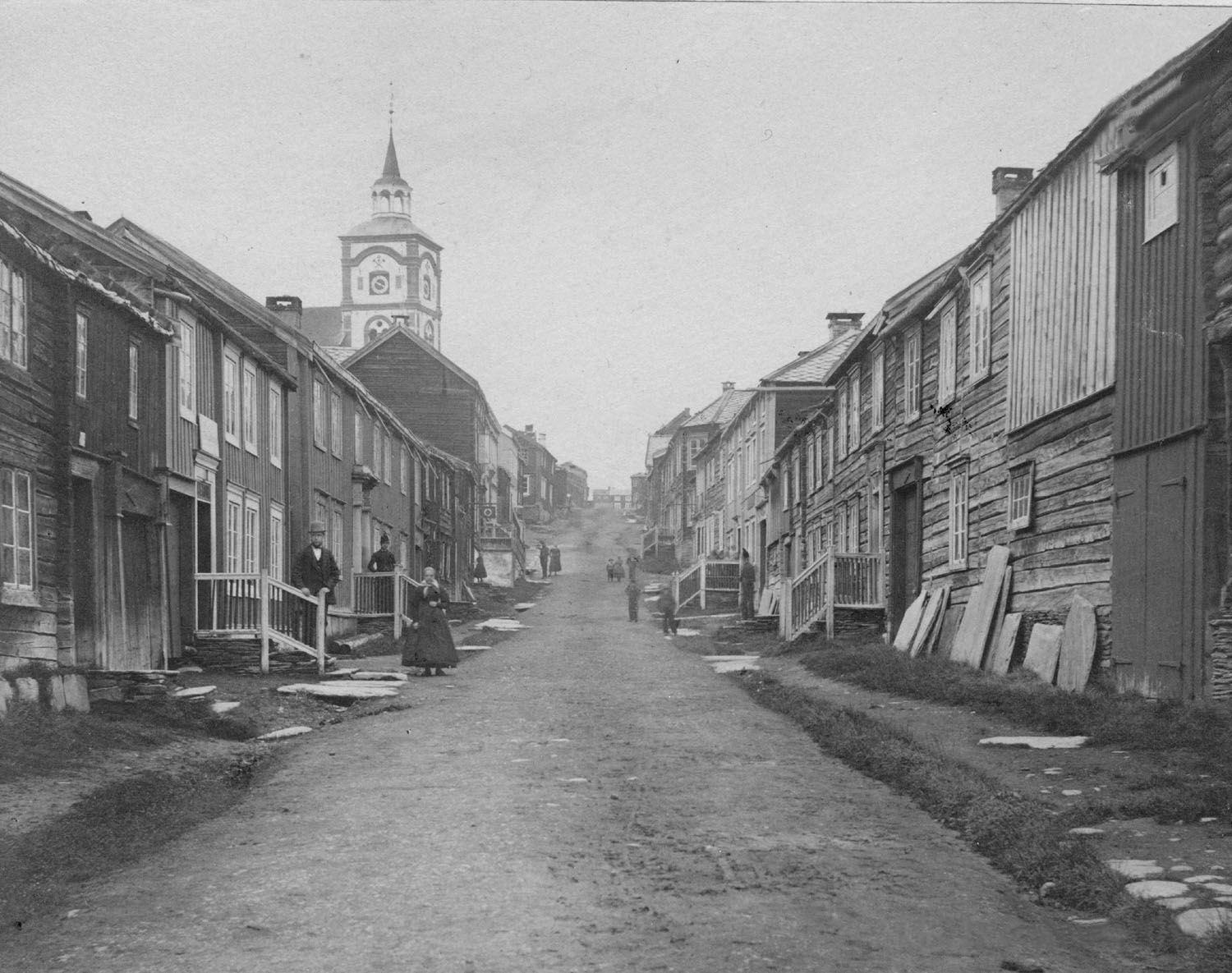
Røros, a major copper mining town, in 1869

The textile industry started in the 1840s, which was followed up with mechanical workshops to build new machinery as the British embargo hindered import of textile machinery. An economic crisis hit the country from 1848, resulting in Marcus Thrane establishing the first trade unions and demanding that equality before the law be independent of social class. Parliament passed a series of laws abandoning economic privileges and easing domestic trade during the 1840s and 1850s. Population increase forced the clearing of new land, although some of the growth came in the cities. The population of Christiania reached 40,000 in 1855. By 1865 the population reached 1.7 million; the large increase was largely caused by better nutrition from herring and potatoes, a sharp decrease of infant mortality and increased hygiene. Emigration to North America started in 1825, with the first mass emigration commencing in the 1860s. By 1930, 800,000 people had emigrated, the majority settling in the Midwestern United States.

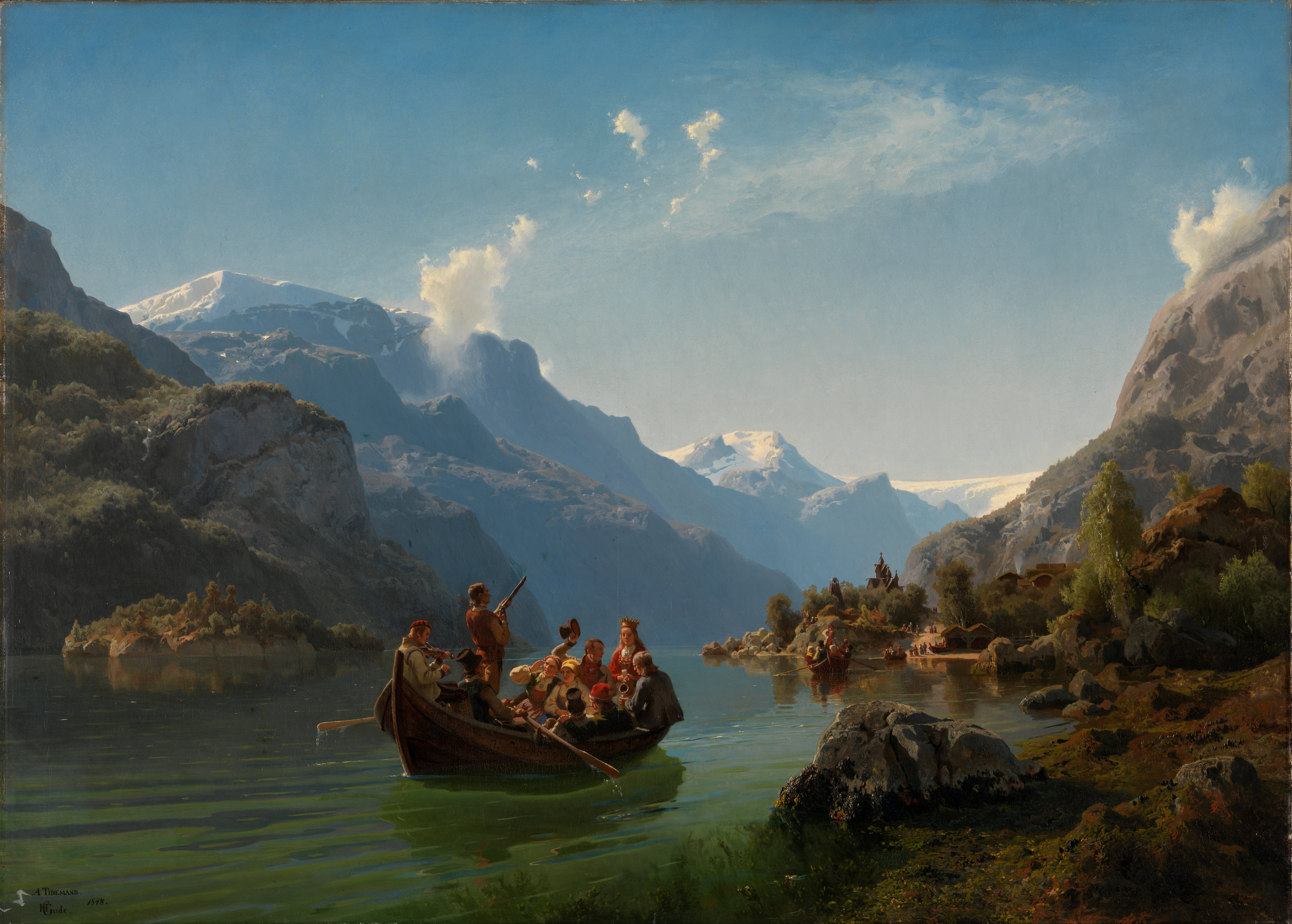
Bridal Journey in Hardanger (1848) by Adolph Tidemand and Hans Gude, an example of romantic nationalism

The population decrease resulted in a labor shortage in agriculture, which again resulted in increased use of machinery and thus capital. The government stimulated the process through the creation of the Mortgage Bank in 1851 and the State Agricultural College eight years later. The 19th century saw a large increase of road construction and steamship services commenced along the coast. The first railway, the Trunk Line between Christiania and Eidsvoll opened in 1854, followed a year later by the first telegraph line. Export industry commenced with steam-powered sawmills in the 1860s, followed by canned herring, wood pulp and cellulose. From 1850 to 1880 the Norwegian shipping industry enjoyed a large boom, stimulated by the abolishing of the British Navigation Acts. By 1880 there were 60,000 Norwegian seamen and the country had the world's third-largest merchant marine. As the first coast-to-coast railway, the Røros Line connected the capital to Trondheim in 1877. Norway joined the Scandinavian Monetary Union in 1875 and introduced the Norwegian krone with a gold standard, along with the metric system being introduced.

=== The last decades of the Union ===
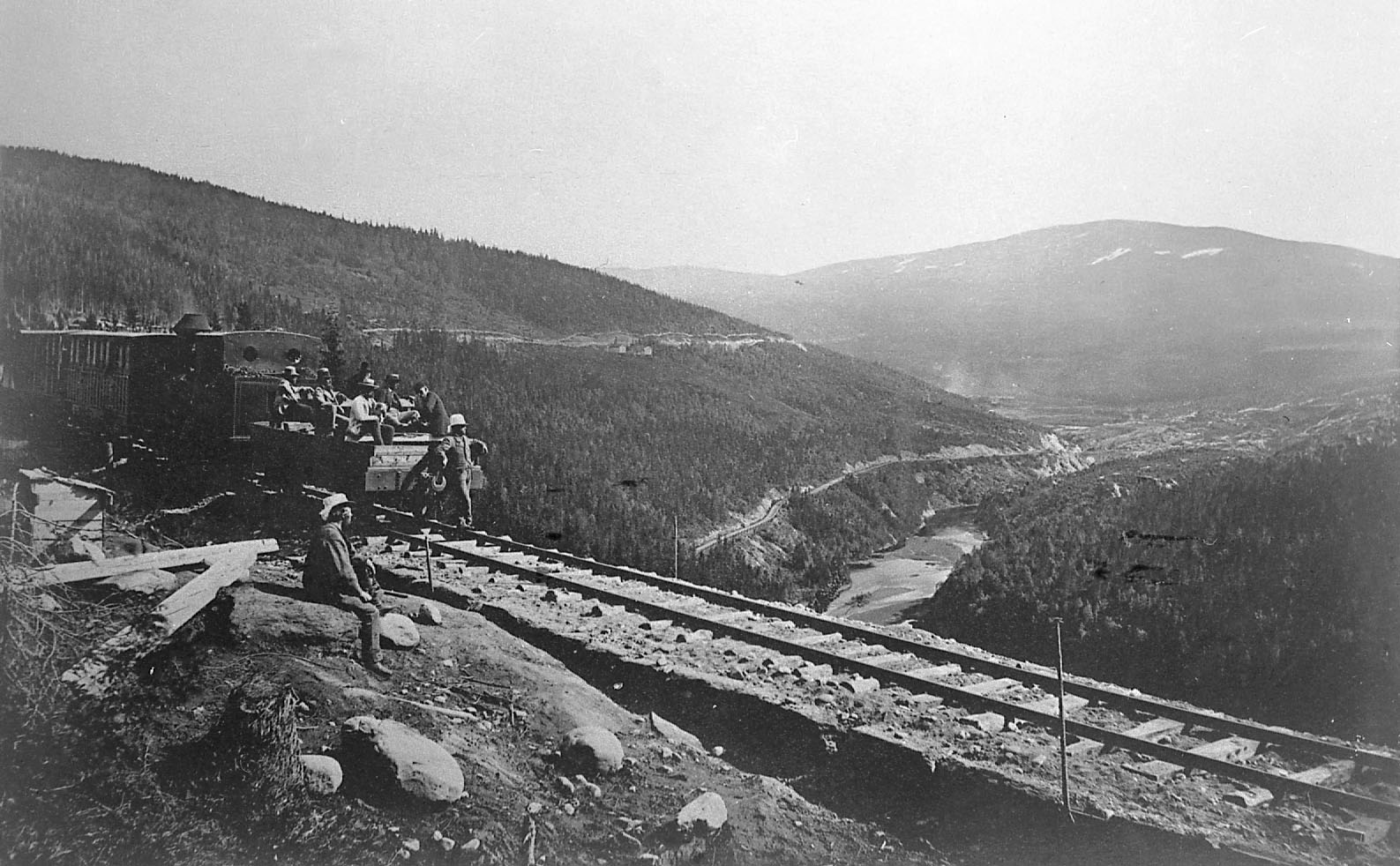
The Røros Line through Holtålen Municipality in 1877

Annual parliamentary sessions were introduced from 1869 and in 1872 ministers were, through a constitutional amendment, required to meet in Parliament to defend their policies. The king, despite having no constitutional right to do so, vetoed the amendment in three successive parliaments. The 1882 election saw the first two parties, the Liberals and Conservatives, run for election, and subsequently the majority succeeded at impeaching the cabinet. In 1884, King Oscar II appointed majority leader Johan Sverdrup as prime minister, thus establishing parliamentarism as the first European country. The Liberal Party introduced a series of legal reforms, such as increasing the voting rights to about half of all men, settling the language conflict by establishing two official written standards, Riksmål and Landsmål, introduced juries, seven years of compulsory education and, as the first European country, universal suffrage for men in 1889.

The 1880s and 1890s saw the rise of the labor movement and trade unions became common; the Norwegian Confederation of Trade Unions was established in 1899 and the Norwegian Employers' Confederation the following year. The Labor Party had its first parliamentary members elected in 1903. The women's issue became increasingly dominant through the 1880s and they were gradually permitted to take secondary and tertiary education. Norwegian support of the union decreased towards the end of the 1890s, especially following the 1897 Swedish abolition of the free trade agreement and the lack of a Norwegian foreign minister. Negotiations of independence commenced, but were not effective because of shifting governments and the Swedish threat of war.

== Independence ==
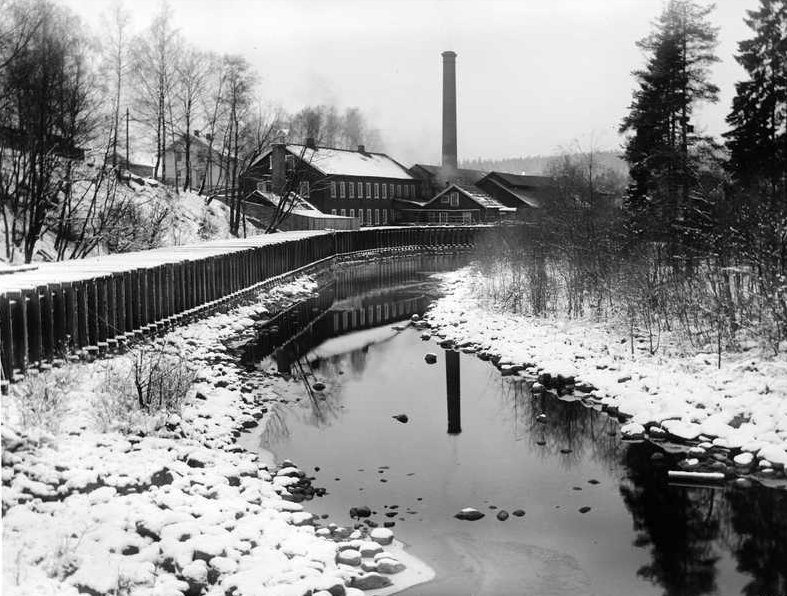
Industry along Akerselva in Oslo in 1912

With the four-party Michelsen's Cabinet appointed in 1905, Parliament voted to establish a Norwegian consular service. This was rejected by the king and on 7 June Parliament unanimously approved the dissolution of the union. In the following dissolution referendum, only 184 people voted in favor of a union. The government offered the Norwegian crown to Denmark's Prince Carl, who after a plebiscite became Haakon VII. The following ten years, Parliament passed a series of social reforms, such as sick pay, factory inspection, a ten-hour working day and worker protection laws. Waterfalls for hydroelectricity became an important resource in this period and the government secured laws to hinder foreigners from controlling waterfalls, mines and forests. Large industrial companies established in these years were Elkem, Norsk Hydro and Sydvaranger. The Bergen Line was completed in 1909, the Norwegian Institute of Technology was established the following year and women's suffrage was introduced in 1913—as the second country in the world. From the 1880s to the 1920s, Norwegians carried out a series of polar expeditions. The most important explorers were Fridtjof Nansen, Roald Amundsen and Otto Sverdrup. Amundsen's expedition in 1911 became the first to reach the South Pole.

Roald Amundsen, Helmer Hanssen, Sverre Hassel and Oscar Wisting (l–r) at Polheim, the tent erected at the South Pole on 16 December 1911 as the first expedition

Norway adopted a policy of neutrality from 1905; during World War I the Norwegian merchant marine was largely used in support of the British, resulting in Norway being classified as The Neutral Ally. Half the Norwegian fleet was sunk and 2,000 seamen were killed by the German Atlantic U-boat Campaign. Some merchants made huge profits from trade and shipping during the war, resulting in an increased division between the classes. The interwar period was dominated by economic instability caused among other by strikes, lock-outs and the monetary policy causing deflation to compensate for too much money having been issued during the war and thus hindering investments. Especially fishermen were hit hard in the period, while farmers retained market prices through organizing regulations. Unemployment peaked at ten percent between 1931 and 1933. Although industrial production increased by eighty percent from 1915 to 1939, the number of jobs remained stable. The Norwegian School of Economics was established in 1936.

Norway had nine governments between 1918 and 1935, nearly all minority and lasting an average eighteen months. The Agrarian Party was established in 1920, although this period saw a rise of support for the Conservatives. The Labor Party split in 1921, with the left wing establishing the Communist Party. Although strong during the 1920s, they were marginalized through the 1930s. A short-lived Labor Government reigned in 1928, but did not establish a sound parliamentary support until the 1935 Nygaardsvold's Cabinet, based on an alliance with the Agrarian Party. During the 1920s and 1930s, Norway established three dependencies, Bouvetøya, Peter I Island and Queen Maud Land, annexed Jan Mayen and secured sovereignty of Svalbard through the Svalbard Treaty. Norway's first civil airport, Stavanger, opened in 1937.

== World War II ==
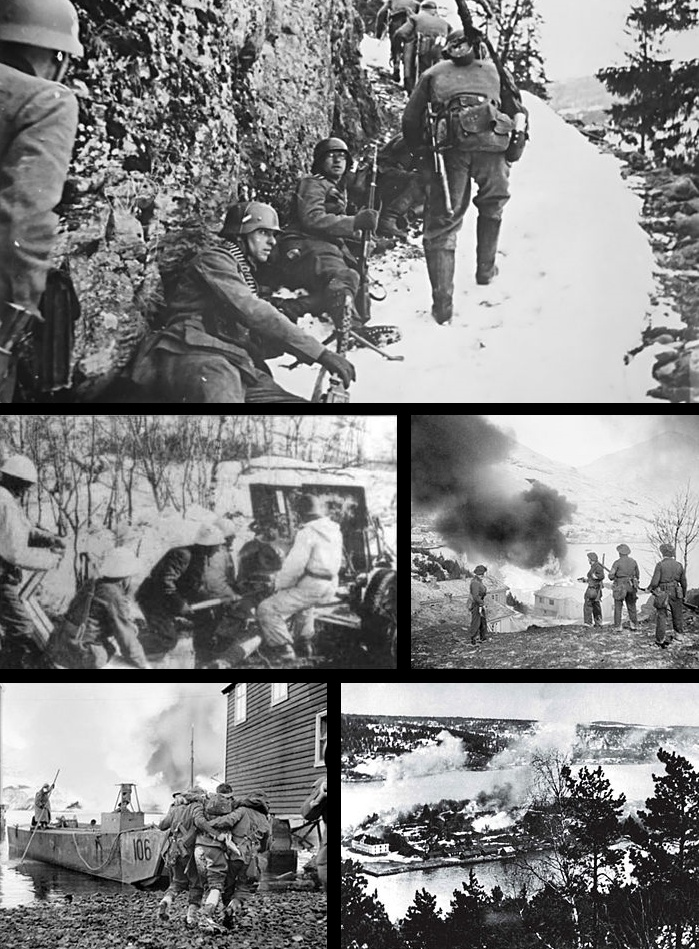
Scenes from the Norwegian campaign in 1940

From the start of World War II in 1939, Norway maintained a strict neutrality. Both Britain and Germany realized the strategic location; both made plans to invade Norway, regardless of Norwegian opposition. The Germans struck first and invaded Norway on 9 April 1940 in the so called operation "Weserübung". After furious battles with Norwegian and British forces, Germany prevailed and controlled the country until the end of the war. The German goal was to use Norway to control access to the North Sea and the Atlantic, and to station air and naval forces to stop convoys from Britain to the USSR.

=== Government in exile ===
The government in exile, including the royal family, escaped to London. Politics were suspended and the government coordinated action with the Allies, retained control of a worldwide diplomatic and consular service, and operated the huge Norwegian merchant marine. It organized and supervised the resistance within Norway. One long-term impact was the abandonment of a traditional Scandinavian policy of neutrality; Norway became a founding member of NATO in 1949. Norway at the start of the war had the world's fourth largest merchant fleet, at 4.8 million tons, including a fifth of the world's oil tankers. The Germans captured about 20% of the fleet but the remainder, about 1000 ships, were taken over by the government. Although half the ships were sunk, the earnings paid the expenses of the government.

=== Quisling regime ===
Vidkun Quisling proclaimed himself prime minister and appointed a government with members from the National Unity Party. He was quickly set aside and replaced by Josef Terboven, but reinstated in 1942. The Norwegian campaign continued in Northern Norway and the government fled to London on 7 June. The German occupation resulted in a brutalization of society and 30,000 people were imprisoned. 55,000 people joined the National Unity Party, which became the only legal party. But the nazification process failed after the Supreme Court resigned and both organized sports and bishops boycotted the new regime. A resistance movement was established and was coordinated from London from 1943. Stokker reports that hostile humour against the Germans helped maintain morale and build a wall against collaboration. Jokes made the rounds dripping with contempt for the oppressors, ridicule of Nazi ideology, stressing the cruelty of the Nazis and mocking their inflated self-image. People on the street asked, "Do you know the difference between the Nazis and a bucket of manure? The bucket." In Post Office lines they explained, "It's rumored that we're getting new stamps bearing Quisling's likeness, but distribution has been delayed because no one knows which side to spit on." The jokes worked to educate Norwegians about the occupation, and encourage a sense of solidarity. At the time of German surrender on 8 May 1945, there were 360,000 German soldiers in the country.

== Postwar ==
=== 1945–1950 ===
A legal purge took place in Norway after WWII in which 53,000 people were sentenced for treason and 25 were executed. The post-war years saw an increased interest in Scandinavism, resulting in Scandinavian Airlines System in 1946, the Nordic Council in 1952 and the Nordic Passport Union along with the metric system being introduced. Reconstruction after the war gave Norway the highest economic growth in Europe until 1950, partly created through rationing private consumption allowing for higher industrial investments. The Labor Party retained power throughout the period and maintained a policy of public planning. The University of Bergen was created in 1946. The 1950s saw a boom in construction of hydroelectricity and the state built the steel mill Norsk Jernverk and two aluminum works. State banks such as the State Housing Bank, the State Educational Loan Fund and Postbanken allowed for governmental control over private debt. Oslo hosted the 1952 Winter Olympics.

Norway retained its neutrality policy until 1947, focusing on its membership in the United Nations, where Trygve Lie had become the first secretary-general. However, there was no enthusiasm for the UN at the time. Anti-communism grew with a Soviet proposal for joint control over Svalbard and especially after the 1948 Czechoslovak coup d'état, after which the Communist Party lost all influence. Norway started negotiations for the creation of a Scandinavian defense union, but instead opted to become a founding member of the North Atlantic Treaty Organization (NATO). However, Norway never allowed permanently stationed foreign troops or nuclear weapons on Norwegian soil to avoid agitating the Soviet Union, with which Norway from 1944 shared a land border. NATO financed large parts of the Norwegian military investments, which ultimately resulted in numerous airports being built during the 1950s and 1960s.

=== Marshall Plan ===
Norway joined the Marshall Plan ("ERP") in 1947, receiving US$400 million in American support. Given the business background of the Marshall Plan's American leaders, their readiness to work with the Norwegian Labor government's ERP Council disappointed the conservative Norwegian business community. It was represented by the major business organizations, the Norges Industriforbund and the Norsk Arbeidsgiverforening. While reluctant to work with the government, Norwegian business leaders also recognized the dangers of appearing to obstruct the implementation of the Marshall Plan. American acceptance of a role for government in economic planning reflected their New Deal reformist orientation. The opportunities for mediation between conservative Norwegian business interests and the government that arose in the course of administering the Marshall Plan helped establish a base for the emergence of Norwegian corporatism in the 1950s.

=== 1950 to 1972 ===
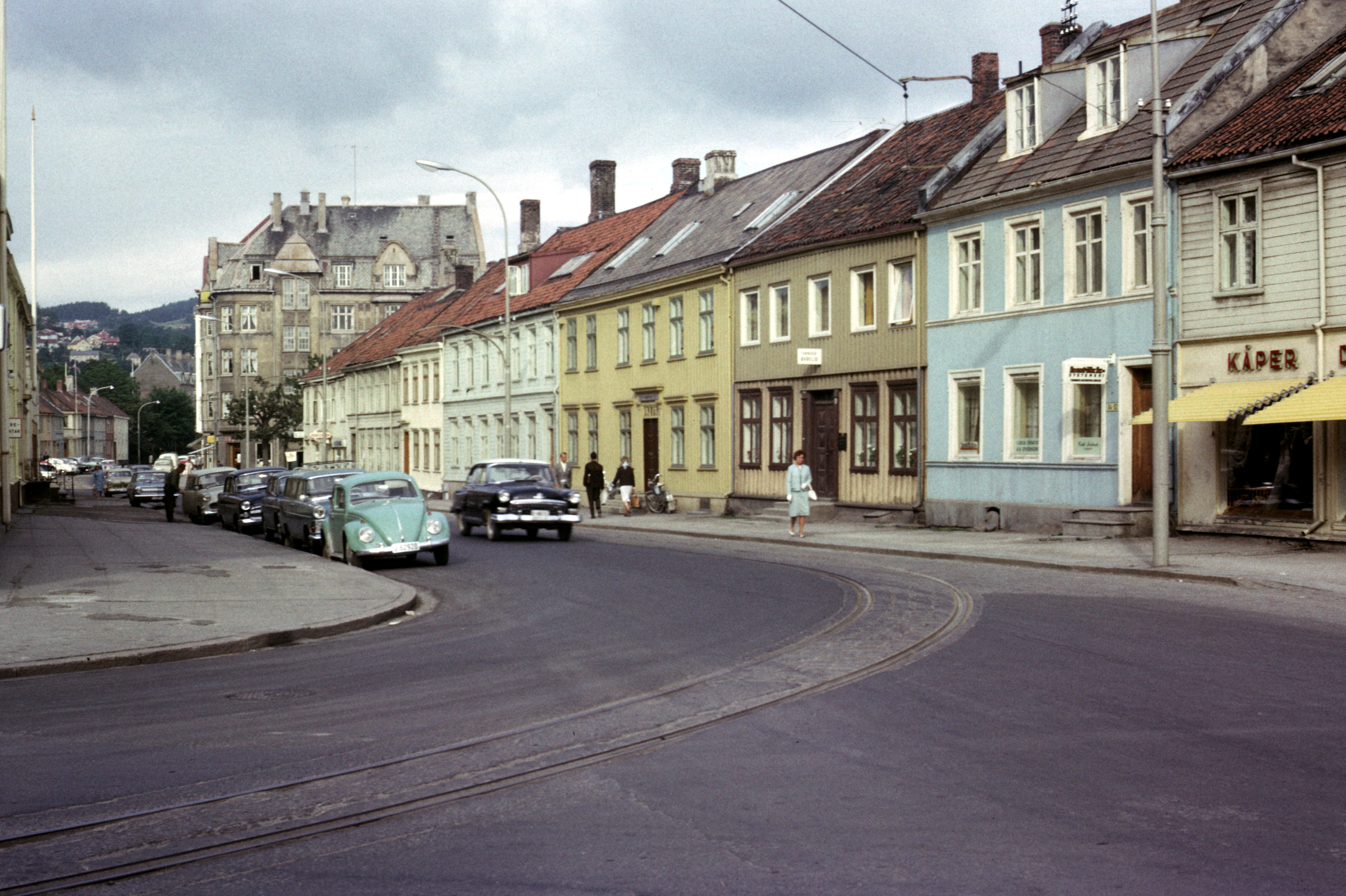
Trondheim in 1965

The sale of cars was deregulated in October 1960, and in the same year the Norwegian Broadcasting Corporation introduced Norway's first television broadcasts. Norway feared competition from Swedish industry and Danish agriculture and chose not to join any free trade organizations until 1960, when it joined the European Free Trade Association. Throughout the post-war period both fishing and agriculture became more mechanized, the agricultural subsidies rose to the third-highest in the world and the number of small-scale farms and fishermen fell dramatically. The Socialist People's Party was created in 1961 by former Labor politicians who disagreed with the Labor Party's NATO, nuclear and European policies. Following the Kings Bay Affair the Conservative Lyng's Cabinet ruled for a month. The Conservative coalition Borten's Cabinet won the 1965 election, sat for six years and started a trend of shifting Labor and Conservative governments. Norwegianization of Samis halted after the war and Sami rights became an increasing issue, with a council being established in 1964.

The completion of the Nordland Line to Bodø in 1962 concluded the construction of new railway routes, while the first part of the Oslo Metro opened in 1966. A social security net was gradually introduced after the war, with child allowances introduced in 1946 and the Social Care Act introduced in 1964. The 1960s saw good times for heavy industry and Norway became Europe's largest exporter of aluminum and the world's largest exporter of ferroalloys. The University of Trondheim and the University of Tromsø both opened in 1968, one year before a network of regional colleges started being opened. Influenced by American culture and similar actions abroad, youth and students started to rebel against cultural norms. The 1960s saw an increased focus on environmentalism, especially through activism, based on ever-more conversion of waterfalls to hydro stations, pollution and the dilapidation of herring stocks. Rondane National Park was created as the country's first in 1962 and the Ministry of the Environment was the first in the world when it was established in 1972. A network of regional airports were built in Western and Northern Norway in the late 1960s and early 1970s. Membership in the European Economic Community was rejected in a 1972 referendum. Economic conditions also improved: By the early 1970s, the Norwegian population had attained one of the highest standards of living in the world. The rising prosperity of the post-war era was demonstrated in the widespread possession of many different consumer goods in households throughout the country. In 1977, for example, 66.3% of households had a car, 78% a washing machine, 96% a vacuum cleaner, 77% a food mixer, 94% a television, 74% a still camera, 56% a cassette recorder and 93% a transistor radio, while in 1976 17% of households had a radio recorder, 56% a tape recorder, and 64% a record player.

== Oil Age ==
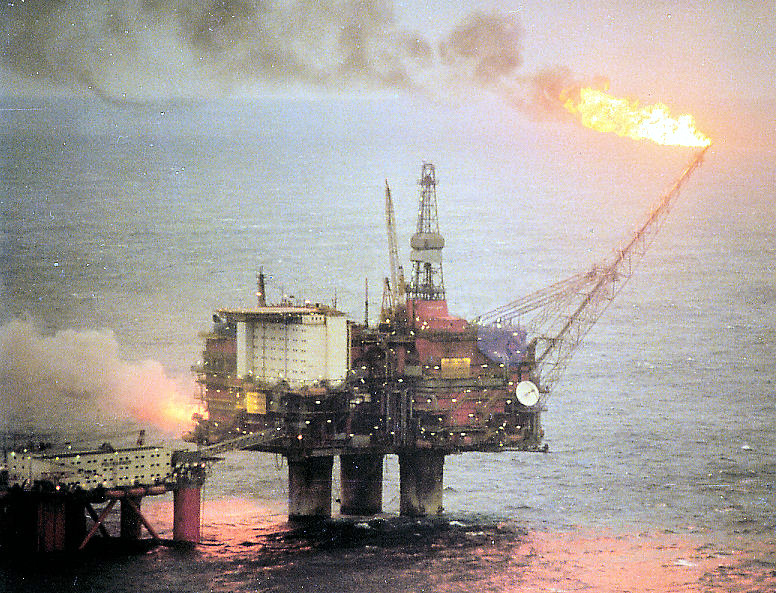
Statfjord oil platform

Prospecting in the North Sea started in 1966 and in 1969 Phillips Petroleum found oil in the Ekofisk field—which proved to be among the ten largest fields in the world. Operations of the fields was split between foreign operators, the state-owned Statoil, the partially state-owned Norsk Hydro and Saga Petroleum. Ekofisk experienced a major blowout in 1977 and 123 people were killed when the Alexander Kielland accommodation rig capsized in 1980; these incidents led to a strengthening of petroleum safety regulations. The oil industry not only created jobs in production, but a large number of supply and technology companies were established. Stavanger became the center of this industry. High petroleum taxes and dividends from Statoil gave high income from the oil industry to the government.

Norway established its exclusive economic zone in the 1970s, receiving an area of 2,000,000 square kilometers (770,000 sq mi). A series of border disputes followed; agreements were reached with Denmark and Iceland in the 1990s, but the border in the Barents Sea was not agreed upon until 2010. Between 1973 and 1981 the country was ruled by the Labor Party, who carried out a series of reforms such as new school system. Farmers received increased subsidies and from 1974 women were permitted to inherit farms. Abortion on demand was legalized in 1978. Loans guaranteed in future oil income allowed Norway to avoid a recession during the mid-1970s. But by 1977 high wages had made Norwegian industry uncompetitive and a soaring forced cut-backs in public and private spending. Fish farming became a new, profitable industry along the coast.

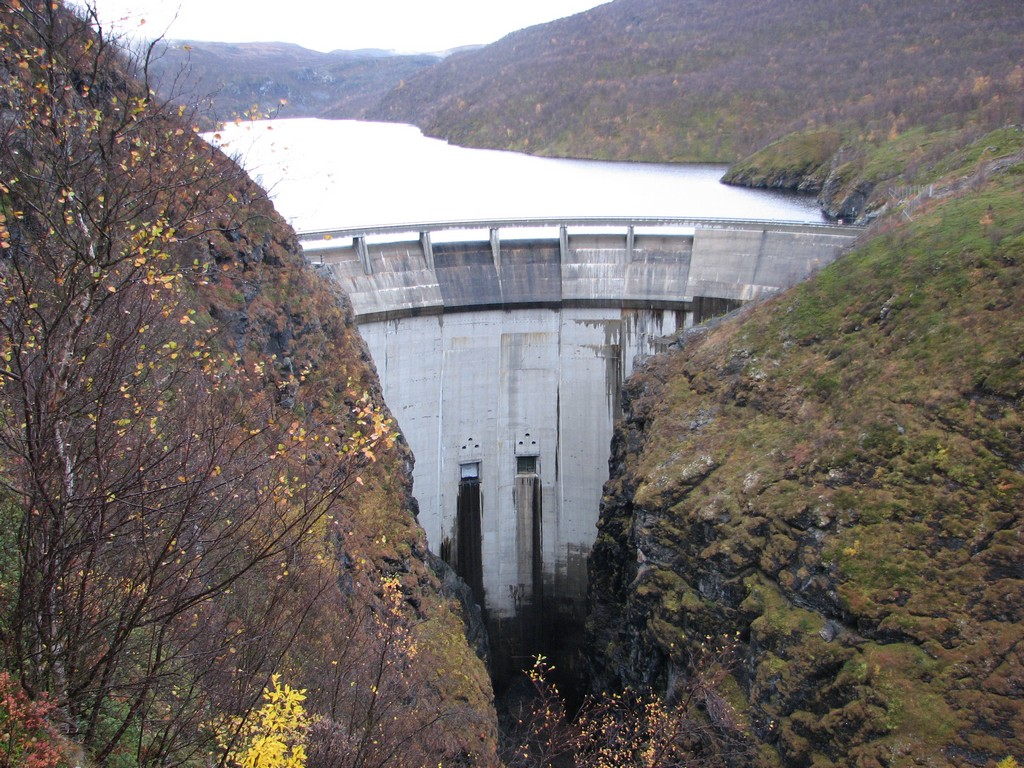
Alta Power Station, built despite massive protests

An immigration surplus was established in the late 1960s, largely from Western Europe and the United States—from the 1970s increasingly expertise in oil. The period also saw an increased immigration of unskilled labor from developing countries, especially Pakistan, and Oslo became the center-point of immigration, although regulations from 1975 slowed this significantly. The Alta controversy started in the 1970s when Statkraft planned to dam the Alta River. The case united the environmental and Sami interest groups; although Alta Power Station was built, the issue shifted the political climate and made large-scale hydroelectricity projects difficult to build. The Sami Parliament was established in 1989.

The Conservative Party won the 1981 elections and carried out a large deregulation reform: taxes were cut, local private radio stations were permitted, cable television was established by private companies, regulations on borrowing money were removed and foreigners were permitted to buy securities. An economic crisis hit in 1986 when foreigners started selling Norwegian krone, which ultimately forced an increase in taxes and Prime Minister Kåre Willoch was forced to resign. The Progress Party, located to the right of the Conservatives, had its break-through in the late 1980s. The high wages in the oil industry made low-skill manufacturing industries uncompetitive and the Labor Party closed a number of public industrial companies which were receiving large subsidies. The 1980s saw a trebling of people on disability, largely amongst the oldest in the workforce, and the crime rate rose.

The subsea Vardø Tunnel opened in 1982 and since the country has built subsea tunnels to connect island communities to the mainland. From the 1980s, the largest cities introduced toll rings to finance new road projects. A banking crisis hit Norway in the late 1980s, causing the largest banks, such as Den norske Bank, Christiania Bank and Fokus Bank, to be nationalized. Norsk Data, a manufacturer of minicomputers, became Norway's second largest company by 1985, just to go bankrupt by 1993. Unemployment reached record-high levels in the early 1990s.

By 1990, Norway was Europe's largest oil producer and by 1995 it was the world's second-largest oil exporter. Membership in the European Union was rejected in a 1994 referendum, with Norway instead joining the European Economic Area and later also the Schengen Area. Large public investments in the 1990s were a new National Hospital and Oslo Airport, Gardermoen—connected to the capital with Norway's first high-speed railway, the Gardermoen Line. A number of large government companies, such as Statoil, Telenor and Kongsberg were privatized. Lillehammer hosted the 1994 Winter Olympics. The end of the Cold War resulted in cooperation with Russia and reduced military activity.

== 21st century ==
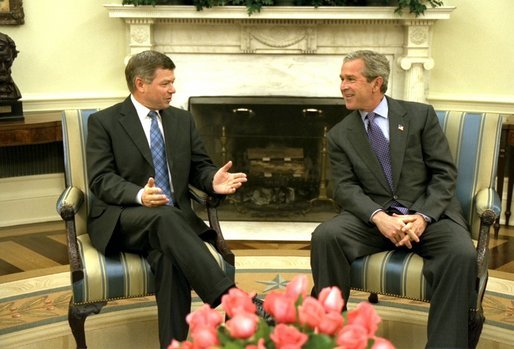
Norwegian Prime Minister Kjell Magne Bondevik met with U.S. President George W. Bush at the Oval Office in White House, on 27 May 2003.

The Norwegian Armed Forces shifted their focus from defending an invasion to being mobile for use in NATO operations abroad and participated in the War in Afghanistan in 2001, Iraq War in 2003, and in the Libyan Civil War in 2011. They were also involved in the NATO bombing of Yugoslavia in 1999.

On 26 December 2004, during Christmas and Boxing Day celebrations, 84 Norwegians in Thailand and Sri Lanka were among the hundreds of thousands of people killed by the magnitude 9.2–9.3 earthquake and tsunami that originated off the coast of Sumatra.

The 2011 attacks saw an attack on the Government Headquarters in Oslo and Workers' Youth League camp at the island of Utøya by the Norwegian gunman Anders Behring Breivik, killing 77 people. It was the worst ever gun massacre made by an individual.

In the 2013 Storting elections, voters ended eight years of Labor rule led by Prime Minister Jens Stoltenberg. A coalition of the Conservative Party and the Progress Party, was elected. The transition came amid an economy in good condition, with low unemployment. In Norwegian parliamentary election 2017 the center-right government of Prime Minister Erna Solberg won re-election. In January 2018, the Liberal Party joined the government, the Christian Democrats joined them in January 2019. The Progress Party left the coalition in January 2020, but it continued to support the government.

Norway's new center-left cabinet under Prime Minister Jonas Gahr Stoere, the leader of Norway's center-left Labor Party, took office on 14 October 2021. He formed a minority coalition government with the Centre Party, supported by the Socialist Left Party. The previous center-right government was ousted in the 13 September election after two four-year terms.

== Gallery ==
=== 2000s–2010 ===
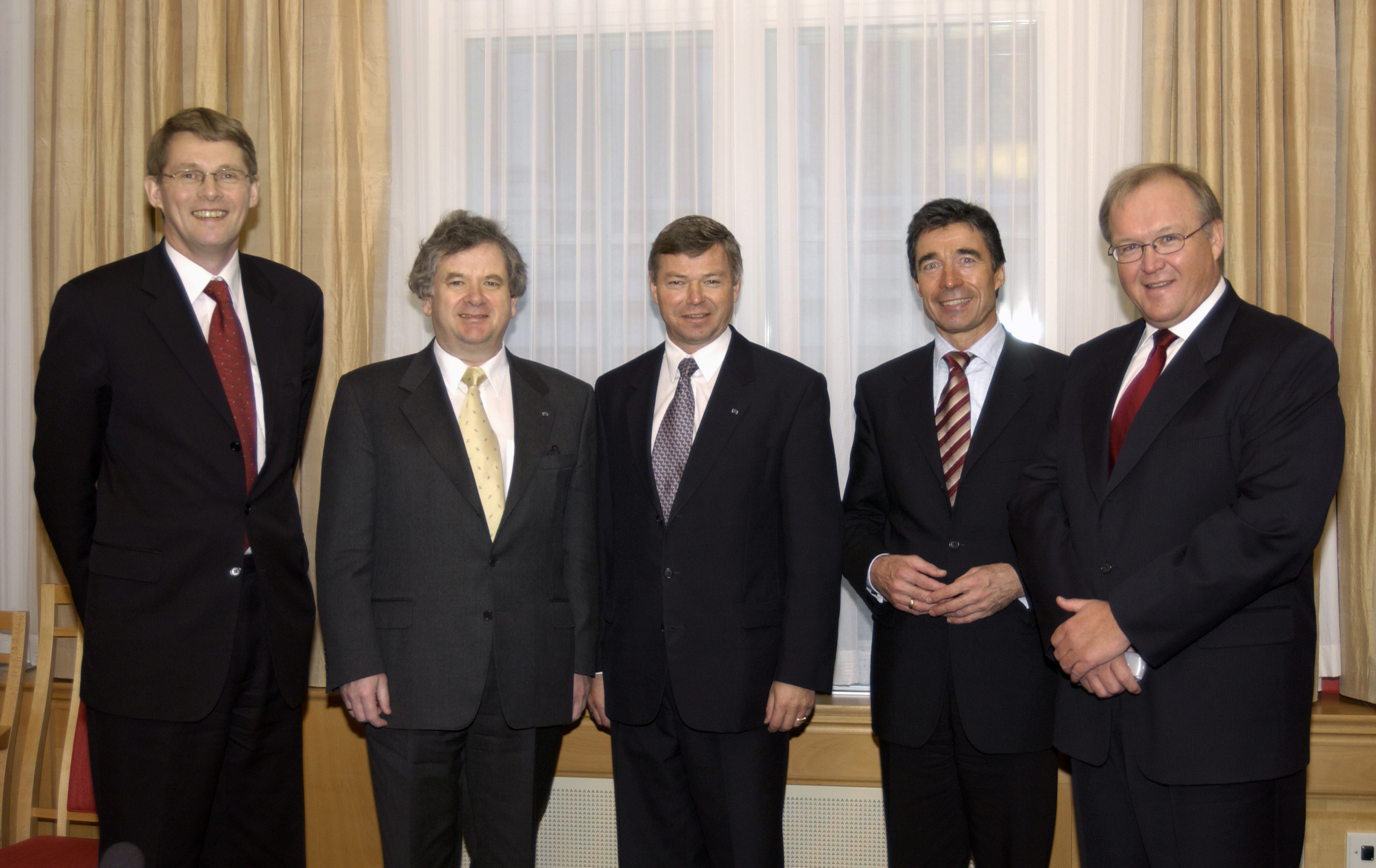
Five Nordic Prime Ministers (Matti Vanhanen (left) from Finland, Davíð Oddsson (second left) from Iceland, Kjell Magne Bondevik (center) from Norway, Anders Fogh Rasmussen (second right) from Denmark, and Göran Persson (right) from Sweden) at the Nordic Council Session in Oslo, on 27 October 2003.

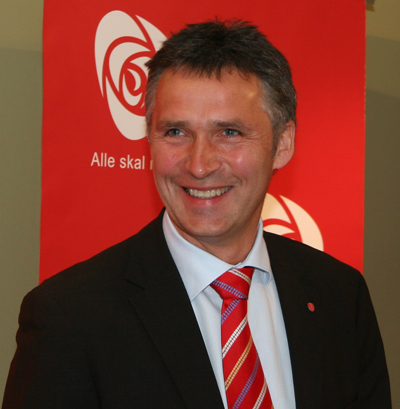
Jens Stoltenberg was the Prime Minister of Norway from 2005 until 2013.

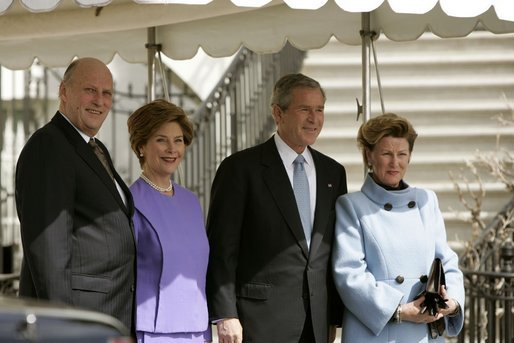
Norwegian King Harald V and Norwegian Queen Sonja, greeted by First Lady of the United States U.S. President George W. Bush and his wife, Laura Bush at the White House during a state visit in Washington, D.C., United States, in March 2005.

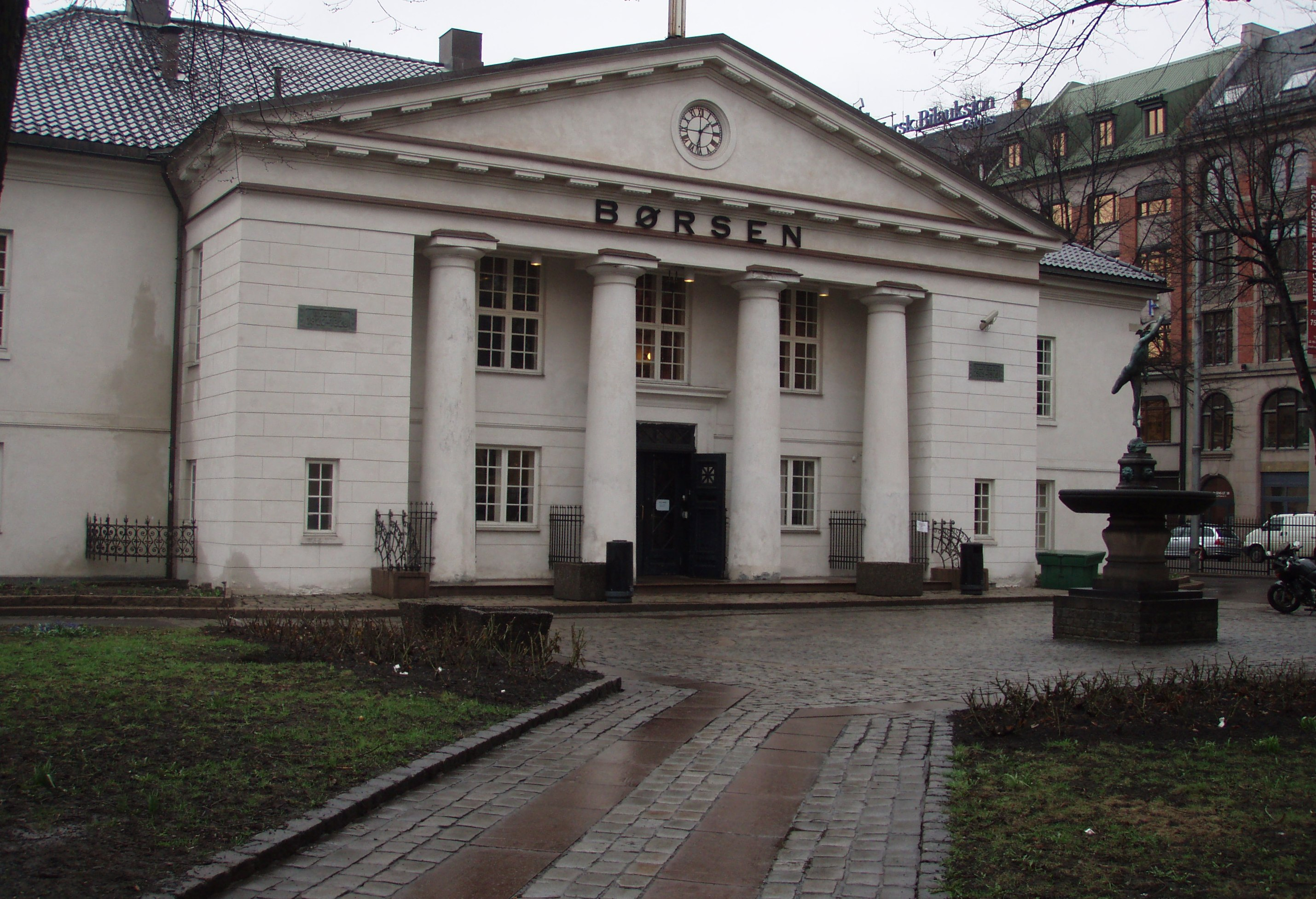
Oslo Stock Exchange languishes during the 2008 financial crisis.

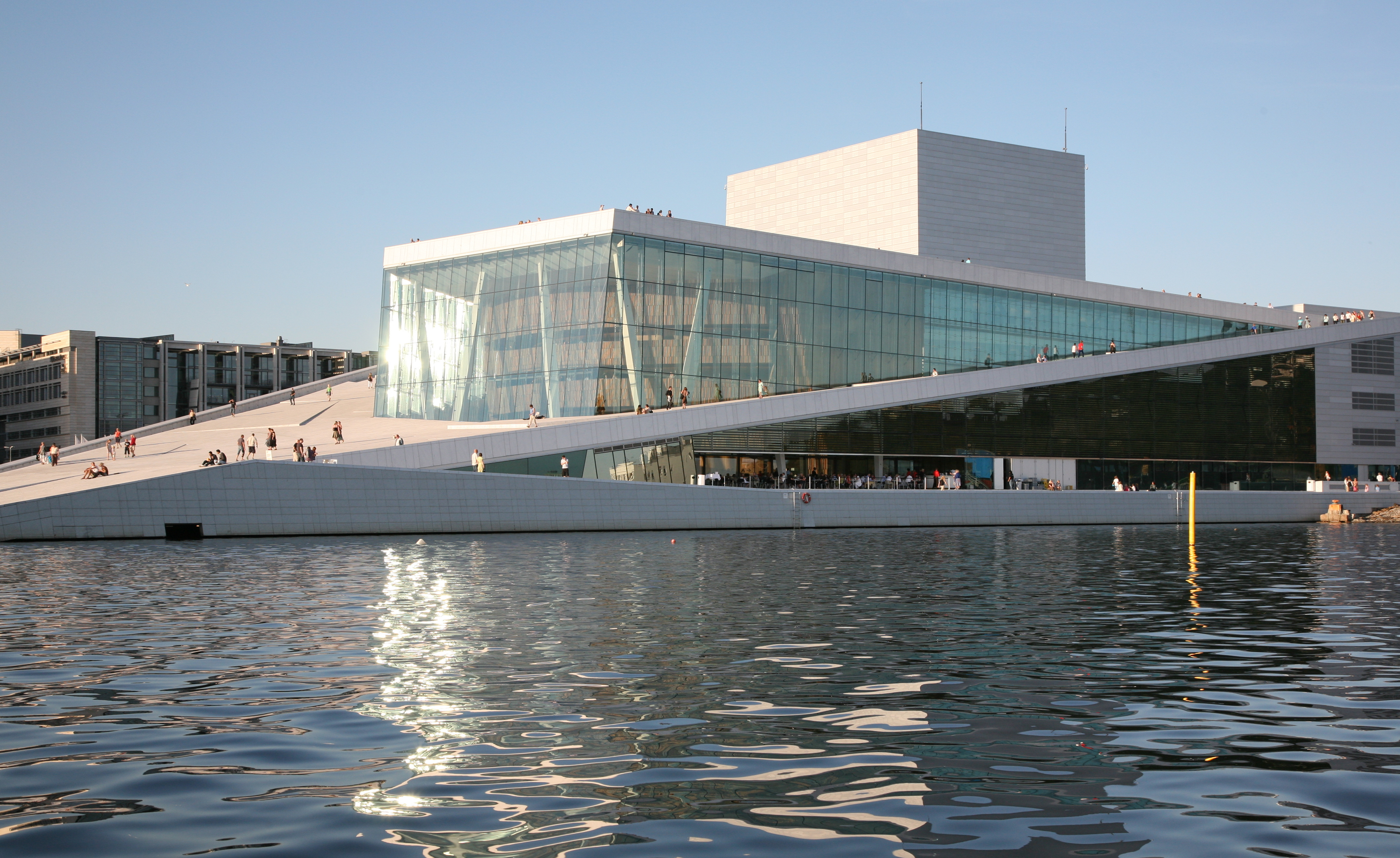
Oslo Opera House opened in 2007 and is part of the Fjord City redevelopment of Oslo's waterfront.

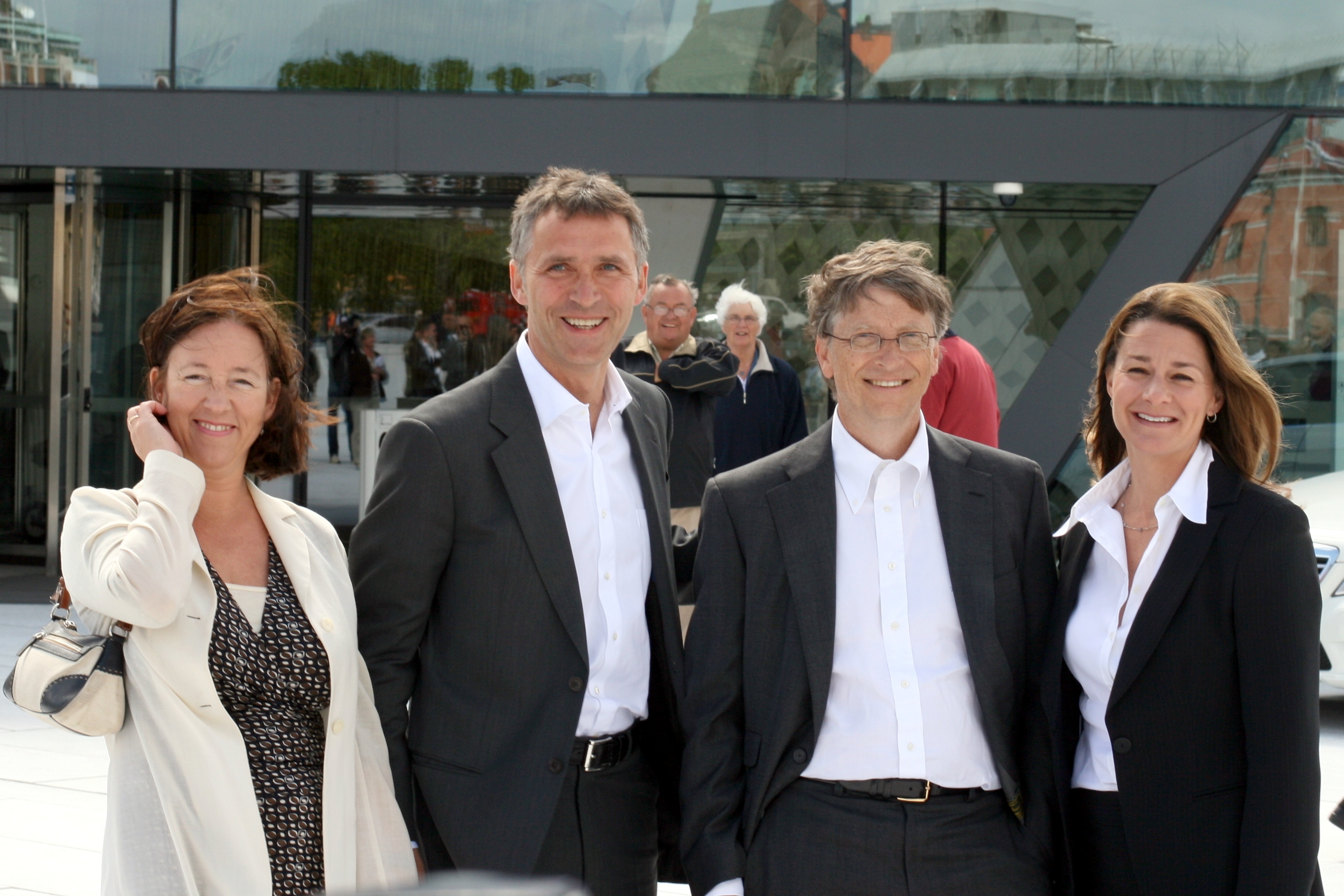
Norwegian Prime Minister Jens Stoltenberg (second left) and his wife Ingrid Schulerud (left), meet with Bill (second right) and Melinda Gates (right) at the visit to the Oslo Opera House, on 3 June 2009.

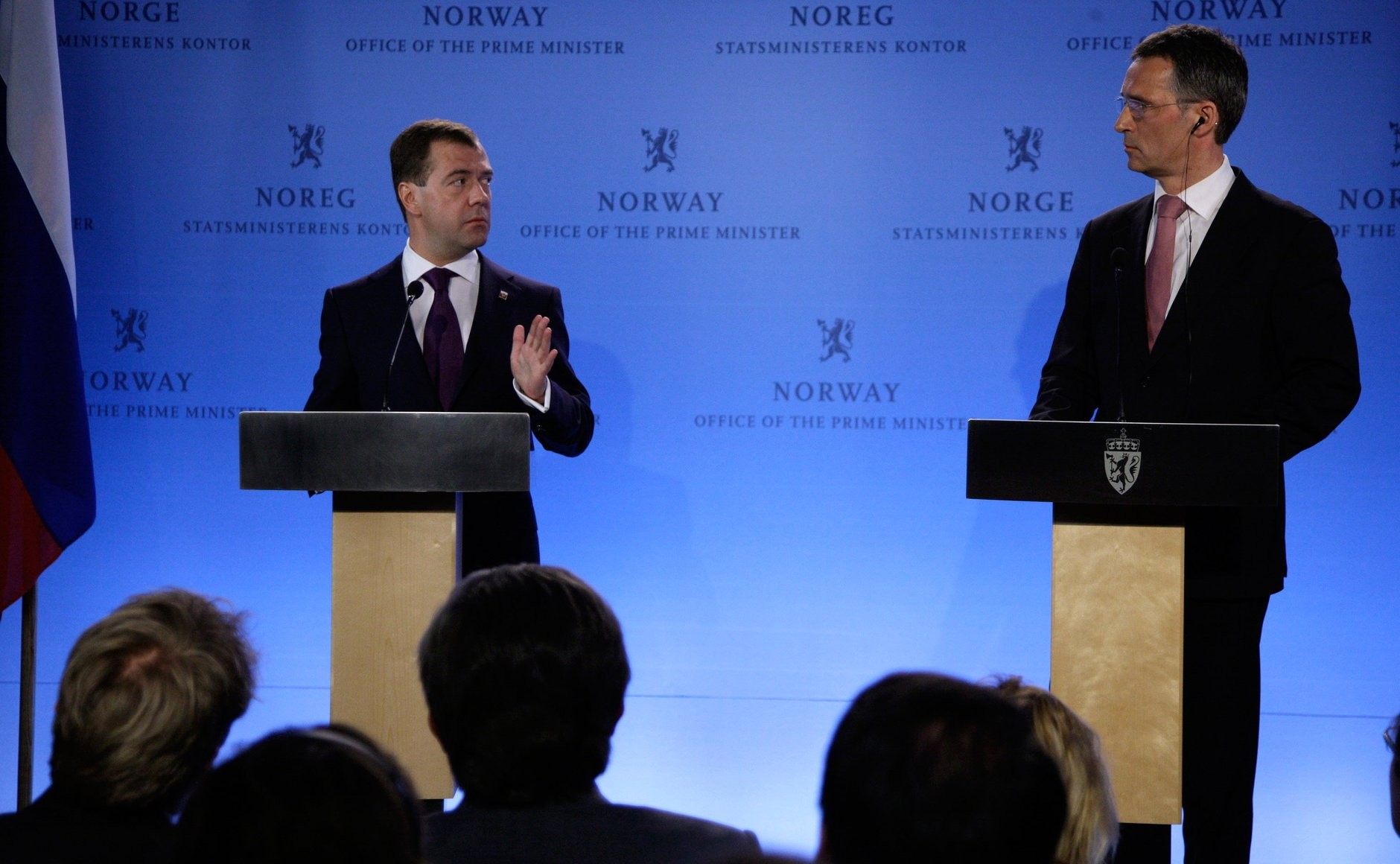
Norwegian Prime Minister Jens Stoltenberg (right) and Russian President Dmitry Medvedev (left) announce that Norway and Russia have settled the long conflict over their maritime border in the Barents Sea, on 27 April 2010.

== See also ==
- Foreign relations of Norway
- Norway and the European Union
- Arctic policy of Norway
