= Dual income tax =

The dual income tax system levies a proportional tax rate on all net income (capital, wage, and pension income minus deductions) combined with progressive tax rates on gross labour and pension income. This implies that labour income is taxed at higher rates than capital income, and that the value of the tax allowances is independent of the income level. The dual income tax system deliberately moves away from the comprehensive income tax (global income tax) system which taxes all or most (cash) income minus deductions (net income) according to the same rate schedule. The dual income tax was first implemented in the four Nordic countries (Denmark, Finland, Norway and Sweden) through a number of tax reforms from 1987 to 1993. The dual income tax is therefore also known as the Nordic tax system or the Nordic Dual Income Tax.

== History ==
The dual income tax was first proposed by the Danish economist Niels Christian Nielsen in 1980. He suggested that the comprehensive income tax should be replaced by a system involving a flat rate of tax on capital income - at the level of the corporate income tax rate - combined with progressive taxation of the taxpayer's total income from other sources.

The proposal was taken up by a committee appointed by the Savings Bank Association (Sparekasseforeningen) that in the early 1980s prepared a discussion paper for a tax reform. Niels Christian Knudsen, now the president of the Savings Banks Association, contacted in June 1984 the Minister of Finance Isi Foighel and made him aware of the committee's proposal. The discussion paper was subsequently to serve as the basis for the tax minister's negotiations with the opposition on a tax reform.

The Danish minority government did propose a dual income tax in the spring of 1985, but the opposition was reluctant to give up the idea of progressive taxation of capital income. The final tax reform of 1987 included some amount of progressive taxation of capital income, but the top marginal tax rate on capital income (56 percent) was less than the top marginal tax rate of labour income (68 percent). It was thus not a pure dual income tax that was introduced in Denmark in 1987, but the Danish tax system moved considerably away from the comprehensive income tax.

== See also ==
- Taxation in Denmark
- Taxation in Finland
- Taxation in Norway
- Taxation in Sweden
