= 1832 Norwegian parliamentary election =

- June–20 November 1832

All 95 seats in the Storting 48 seats needed for a majority
- Registered: 65,170
- Turnout: 48.02%
Prime Minister before election
Severin Løvenskiold
Prime Minister after election
Severin Løvenskiold

Parliamentary elections were held in Norway in 1832. As political parties were not officially established until 1884, all those elected were independents. The number of seats in the Storting was increased from 81 to 95. Voter turnout was 48%, although only 6% of the country's population was eligible to vote.

== Results ==
Of the 95 seats, 45 were won by farmers, sheriffs, church singers and teachers, 31 by civil servants and 20 by people with other professions.

Party	Votes	%	Seats
Independents			95
Total			95
Total votes	31,296	–	
Registered voters/turnout	65,170	48.02	
Source: Nohlen & Stöver, NSSDS
