= Jon Raude =

13th-century Bishop of Nidaros

- Archbishop of Nidaros
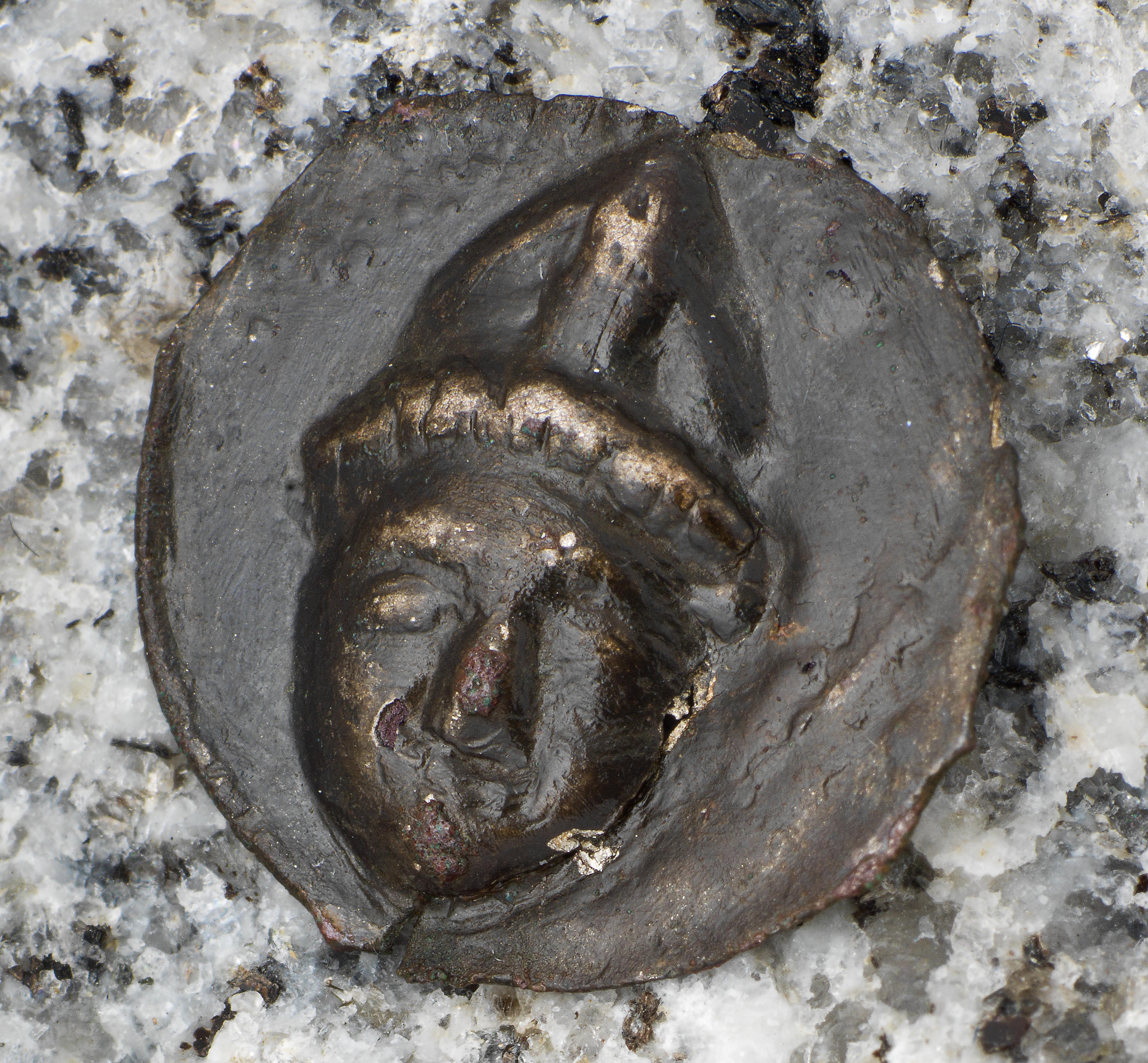
- Depiction of Jon Raude on a bracteate.
- Appointed: October 1267
- Term ended: 10 January 1282
- Predecessor: Håkon
- Successor: Jørund

Orders
- Consecration: 24 June 1268

Personal details
- Died: 21 December 1282 Skara, Västergötland, Sweden

Jon Raude (died 21 December 1282), nicknamed the Steadfast (hinn staðfasti), was Archbishop of Nidaros from October 1267 until his death in 1282. As Archbishop, Raude championed the rights and privileges of the Church against the temporal authority of the king. He developed a church law separate from King Magnus VI's state law and eventually secured royal approval of this law and a number of other privileges at the Tønsberg Concord of 1277, which marked the zenith of church power in medieval Norway.

The concord fell apart after the death of King Magnus, as the regency council for the young King Eric II sought to restrict the church's privileges. Raude and his closest allies were declared outlaws in 1282 and forced to flee the country. He died in exile in Skara in Sweden later that year.

== Early career ==
Jon Raude first appears in literary sources in 1253 as a canon in the cathedral chapter of Nidaros. He was in Rome in 1266, when he was tasked by Pope Clement IV with delivering the pallium to the recently appointed Archbishop Håkon of Nidaros. Håkon died just a year later, and the chapter elected Raude to succeed him. The Pope consented, and Raude was consecrated on 21 December 1268 in Viterbo.

== Archbishop ==
Upon his accession to the Archbishopric, Raude was confronted with King Magnus VI's attempts to modernize and unify the Norwegian law code, which the King intended to apply to the entire realm. Magnus had secured the approval of his law codes by the Gulathing and the Things of Eastern Norway, but when he approached the Frostating for approval in 1269 he was faced with resistance from the Archbishop of Nidaros. Raude believed that only the church itself could regulate church law, and his opposition forced the King to accept that the revisions of the Frostathing Law would only apply to secular law.

Raude began to develop a new Norwegian church law shortly afterward, and in this effort he collaborated with Bishop Árni Þorláksson of Skálholt in Iceland. The new law was based on Canon law, but also partially modeled after King Magnus' laws and an earlier edition of the Frostathing Law written by Archbishop Eystein Erlendsson. The draft of the new church law was finished in 1273. Raude demanded the confirmation of the privileges given to the church by King Magnus Erlingsson, including the right of the bishops to vote first in royal elections and the symbolic submission of the Crown as a fiefdom of the church. King Magnus rejected these demands but agreed to recognize certain other privileges. The negotiations for the new church law were finished in 1273, and the King gave his approval at the Concord of Bergen. After Papal confirmation of the Concord was obtained, the privileges were finally confirmed at the Concord of Tønsberg (Sættargjerden in Tønsberg) on 9 August 1277.

The rights and privileges secured by the church included complete jurisdiction over cases of canon law and those that involved clerics, extensive tax reductions, freedom from providing to the leidang, the right to mint coinage, and trade privileges for the Archbishop. Additionally, the freedom of episcopal elections was guaranteed, and the Archbishop obtained the supreme right to appoint priests, including at the royal chapels. In return, the church relinquished its right to participate in royal elections and gave up its previous claim that the Kingdom of Norway was a fiefdom of the Church. The Concord of 1277 marked the high point of church power in medieval Norway. Archbishop Raude attended the Second Council of Lyon in 1274, where he was tasked with collecting a new tax from his diocese to finance a planned crusade.

King Magnus died in May 1280 and was succeeded by his son Eric II, who was still a minor. Archbishop Raude crowned the young King in the Christ Church in Bergen in the Summer of 1280. He simultaneously called a provincial council, the first known assembly of its kind in Norway. Shortly after, he formulated a statute that defined the church as both a temporal and spiritual power and once again formulated its rights and privileges. In 1281 he crowned King Eric's wife, Margaret of Scotland, as Queen of Norway.

== Downfall and exile ==
Raude's success in obtaining privileges for the church can be partially attributed to King Magnus' desire for peace and reconciliation. The regency council which governed the realm on Eric II's behalf, which was led by his mother Ingeborg of Denmark and dominated by a group of powerful barons, was not as inclined to acquiesce to the church's demands. Their counteroffensive began shortly after King Eric's coronation; the Archbishop's right to mint coinage was revoked, and a new regulation of the tithe, which had been included in Raude's church law, was rescinded. The Archbishop responded by excommunicating several of the leading barons, but found that this move had little effect. Both sides turned to the Pope for support but he remained neutral, possibly because he needed the regency council's support to collect the crusade tax. In 1282, the regency council declared Raude and two of his closest allies, Bishop Andres of Oslo and Bishop Thorfinn of Hamar, outlaws. In the middle of September, Raude and Bishop Andres fled to Skara in Sweden, where the Archbishop died on 21 December.

His body was returned to Norway a year later and buried in Nidaros.
