= Hunters in Transition: An Outline of Early Sámi History =

English study of Sámi peoples by Lars Ivar Hansen

- First edition (publ. Brill)
- Authors: Lars Ivar Hansen and Bjørnar Olsen
- Subject: Sámi history, Archaeology, Ethnography
- Genre: Non-fiction
- Publisher: Brill Publishers
- Publication date: 2013

Hunters in Transition: An Outline of Early Sámi History, by Lars Ivar Hansen and Bjørnar Olsen, is a major English-language study of the history of the Sámi peoples of Fennoscandia. The study partly translates and partly expands and updates the authors' 2004 Samenes historie fram til 1750.

== Summary ==
After an introductory chapter sketching the scope and historiographical and political import of the book, Chapter 2 explores the historiography of historical research on the Sámi, emphasising the ways in which Sámi history and archaeology were systematically marginalised in favour of national histories of the Nordic countries which emphasised their ethnic majorities and the formation of states. The chapter surveys different strategies which scholars used to marginalise Sámi people from national narratives at different times -- positioning them as nomadic primitives; as unchanging subjects of ethnography rather than agents in the changes over time that constitute history; or as Eastern migrants to northern Fennoscandia of no greater antiquity than the North-Germanic and Finnish-speakers on whom national histories focused. It then focuses on the 1980s work of Knut Odner, promoting perspectives on Sámi ethnogenesis inspired by the reconceputalisations of ethnicity in the 1970s by Fredrik Barth and of cultural change by Pierre Bourdieu. Hansen and Olsen argue that researchers should ask not 'when did the Sámi arrive?' but 'why did Sámi identity arise?' They favour an interpretation in which northern Scandinavia was populated from similar sources as the rest of northern Europe following the Last Glacial Maximum, and that, without dramatic migrations, accelerating contact with other peoples led this population to adopt the Uralic language that became Sámi, and to develop a consolidated ethnic identity in contradistinction to neighbouring peoples on the North Atlantic and Baltic coasts, and in Russia. 'Our position is that it may be meaningful to speak of Sámi ethnicity, at least as a retrospective category, from the end of the last millennium BC. Only then do we have documentation of hunting communities in interior, northern, and eastern Fennoscandia being involved in more extensive external interaction that may have caused the crucial "us-them" awareness', they argue (p. 31). The chapter also includes an excursus on the linguistic history of names for the Sámi.

Chapter 3, 'Economic Specialization and Ethnic Consolidation: Northern Hunting Societies in the Iron Age and Early Middle Ages' makes case-studies of a range of archaeologically attested phenomena, alongside the famous Old English account of Ohthere's description of northern Scandinavia and historical-linguistic evidence. the chapter also draws on later medieval Icelandic sagas, loan-words, and place-names. Archaeological material includes the slab-lined pits of the northern Norwegian coast, used for extracting oil from whale blubber; silver hoards in the same region; Stallo sites in the Scandinavian interior; hunter-gatherer settlements in the South Sámi area; lapinrauniot (Finnish) or lapprösen (Swedish; 'Lapp cairns') in what is now Finland. Bringing in the history of the Sámi languages and their descent from their common ancestor with Finnish, Hansen and Olsen argue that even before the widespread adoption of Sámi language among hunter-gatherers of the interior of Fennoscandia and Germanic by coastal populations, the first millennium BCE featured a hunter-gatherer culture in the interior alongside a southern-orientated, agricultural/pastoralist culture on the coasts. The latter later adopted Germanic language and material markers of identity to cement their economic connections with the south. Meanwhile, on the northern shores of the Gulf of Finland, the common ancestor of Finnic and Sámi languages came to be spoken among hunter-gatherers during the last millennium BCE. Some speakers of this language adopted agriculture, and their dialects became the Finnic languages, while the dialects of the hunter-gatherers who adopted it became Sámi. The access of proto-Sámi speakers to trade with Finnic-speakers encouraged other hunter-gatherers to adopt this language and ethnicity, with Sámi developing dialectal variation in the first centuries CE, remaining a single dialect continuum into the eighth century, but breaking up into distinct languages by the sixteenth century.

During the first millennium, there is little evidence for Fennoscandia's hunter-gatherers articulating ostentatious ethnic identities in their material culture. The authors argue that a consolidated Sámi identity took shape as trade connections with other people accelerated, to the East with Novgorod from the ninth century CE and to the West with the Norse. This trade led Sámi people to increase their economic specialisation as hunters, relying with agriculturalists for other goods.

The authors also emphasise evidence suggesting that while the boundary between agriculturalist/Norse and hunter-gatherer/Sámi culture was fairly stable throughout the Iron Age and early Middle Ages, Sámi settlement extended beyond the interior of Fennoscandia. Hansen and Olsen note the lack of Norse settlement in some agriculturally attractive fjords of northern Norway and Sámi presence in south-east Norway in the later medieval Eidsivathing and Borgarthing laws.

Chapter 4, 'Colonization, contacts, and change 1220-1550' picks up on the increasing Viking-Age involvement of the Sámi as specialised hunters in long-distance trading networks to stress three accelerations of this process. Direct colonization of Sámi lands took place by settlers (Norse-speaking fishermen and farmers in northern Norway and Karelians in the east), who increasingly integrated Sámi people into their own economic and administrative structures. The regions inhabited by Sámi people were increasingly brought under the control of different political spheres of influence from emergent states: Norway, Sweden (which was also expanding among the Suomi Finns, Hämäläiset and Karelians), and Novgorod. And Christianisation began as a cultural arm of these demographic, economic and political developments. The chapter uses a series of archaeological case-studies, discussing reindeer trapping in East Finnmark and particularly Varanger, arguing that this ancient technology was expanded to a dramatic degree around the fifteenth century. The authors discuss the appearance (and disappearance) during the period of innovative, multi-roomed houses in the same region, arguing that they reflect complex interactions of Sámi, Norwegian, Russian, and perhaps even turf-building Icelandic fishermen, in the region and cannot be associated with a single ethnic group. They consider the development of a range of sedentary fishing and farming practices based in round turf houses in Troms. The chapter explores the beginnings of a slow shift towards reindeer pastoralism that had profound effects on those communities that undertook it. Hansen and Olsen argue that external demands of trade and taxation increased the pressure to produce a surplus of animal products; pressure from neighbouring societies discouraged social conservatism; complex trapping systems demanded and encouraged an organisational elite, concepts of property (either of systems, land, or caught animals); and the trapping systems enabled the capture of live animals. They emphasise, however, that these changes were far from inevitable, happening to the east in the Skolt Sámi areas much later. The chapter also surveys evidence for Sámi ritual life in the context of expanding Christian culture.

The focus of Chapter 5, 'State Integration and Sámi Rights ca. 1550–1750' shifts to written, historical evidence. It explores the extensively evidenced process of early-modern Scandinavian states consolidating their powers and jurisdictions and formalising their borders, and the diverse ways in which Sámi people complicated Scandinavian-speakers' statist programmes. It studies the varied impacts of state integration on Sámi populations in different regions. Chapter 6, 'Missionaries and Shamans: Sámi Religion and the Campaign against it' recapitulates the history of Sámi encounters with Christianity, reaching back into the Middle Ages; addresses the ways in which Sámi people were particularly targeted in seventeenth-century Swedish and Norwegian witchcraft trials; examines seventeenth- and eighteenth-century missionary campaigns; and contemplates what missionaries' accounts of Sámi religion can tell us about actual Sámi religious practice. These chapters read the mid-eighteenth century as a turning point in Sámi history, marking a natural end to the period studied by the book:

At this point in time, a number of the earlier tendencies culminated and they assumed more permanent institutional forms, which again provided trajectories for further developments. From the last half of the eighteenth century, the Sámi had to cope with the fact that their land had been intersected by definitive, territorial national borders, that their customary rights and usage of resources were largely defined and evaluated on the basis of the states’ legal systems, and that their religious beliefs and practices, at least officially, had to comply with the states’ Christian religions. Through the infrastructure that had now been established, the states could, with increasing effectiveness, implement their numerous political ambitions in the Sámi areas.

== Reviews ==
- Sirpa Aalto, review, Scandinavian Journal of History, 40.2 (2015), 272-74 doi:10.1080/03468755.2015.1004794.
- Eero Muurimäki, review, Fennoscandia archaeologica, 33 (2016), 248-55.
- J. M. Nordin, review, Medieval Archaeology, 59.1 (2015), 398-99.
