= Kingdom of Norway (872–1397) =

Former Kingdom in Europe

The Norwegian Realm Norwegian Realm: Konungsríki Noregr (Old Norwegian); Konungsríki Noregi (Middle Norwegian)
- 872–1397
- Likely royal banner used since the 13th century Coat of arms variant used from the 12th–13th century

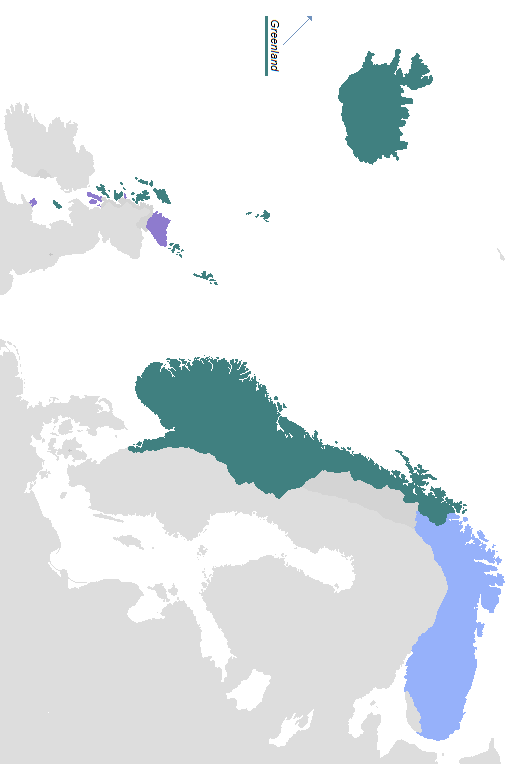
- Areas under the Crown of Norway (green), vassals of Norway (purple), joint tax territory (blue)
- Status: Regional state (872–1027 (Note: The peak is conventionally understood to begin after the last phase of the unification during the reign of Saint Olav in the 1020s.)); Unitary state (1027–1380 (Note: In 1380, the "Twin Kingdoms" of Norway and Denmark established a dual monarchy, which in 1397 grew to include Sweden, creating the Kalmar Union. This was then succeeded by a Dano-Norwegian union, which lasted up until 1814, at which point Iceland, Greenland, and the Faroe Islands became split from Norway as a consequence of the Napoleonic Wars.))
- Capital: Ǫgvaldsnes (Avaldsnes) (872–997); Niðaróss (Trondheim) (997–1016, 1028–1067, 1150–1217); Borg (Sarpsborg) (1016–1028); Biǫrgvín (Bergen) (1067–1123, 1217–1314); Konungahella (Kungälv) (1123 – c. 1150); Ósló (1314–1397)
- Common languages: Majority languages: Old Norse; Old Norwegian; Norn; Old Icelandic; Old Faroese; Greenlandic Norse; Other languages: Gaelic; Old Swedish; Sami; Greenlandic; Old Danish; Brythonic; Lingua franca: Latin; Middle Low German; Writing system: Younger Futhark (872–1100); Medieval runes (1100–1397); Latin (1015–1397)
- Religion: State religion: Roman Catholicism (1015–1397); Other religions: Norse paganism (decentralized beliefs, myths and practices); Sámi shamanism (among Finno-Ugric people); goðlauss (lack of faith in any deity)
- Demonyms: Norwegian; Sami people
- Government: Decentralised thing system alongside a non-feudal monarchy
- Monarch
  - 872–932: Harald I (first)
  - 1387–1397: Margaret I (last)
- Legislature: None (872–c. 1000); Þing (i.e. Gulatingslǫg, Borgarþingslǫg, Heiðsævisþing, and Frostuþingslǫg) (c. 1000–c. 1300); Riksråd (c. 1300–1397)
- Historical era: Middle Ages
  - Established: 872
  - Disestablished: 1397
- Currency: Norwegian penning (995–1397)
Preceded by
Petty kingdoms of Norway
Icelandic Commonwealth
North Sea Empire
Succeeded by
Kalmar Union
Hanseatic League
- Today part of: See: Loss of Norwegian possessions

The term Norwegian Realm (Old Norse: *Noregsveldi, Bokmål: Norgesveldet, Nynorsk: Noregsveldi or Noregsveldet) and Old Kingdom of Norway refer to the Kingdom of Norway's peak of power in the 13th century after a long period of civil war before 1240. The kingdom was a loosely unified state including the territory of modern-day Norway, modern-day Swedish territory of Jämtland, Herjedalen, Ranrike (Bohuslän) and Idre and Särna, as well as Norway's overseas possessions which had been settled by Norwegian seafarers for centuries before being annexed or incorporated into the kingdom as 'tax territories'. To the North, Norway also bordered extensive tax territories on the mainland. Norway, whose expansionism starts from the very foundation of the Kingdom in 872, reached the peak of its power in the years between 1240 and 1319.

A unified realm was initiated by warrior bands that had coalesced around Harald "Shockhead" Hálfdanarson—later known as King Harald Fairhair—in the 9th century. Before Harald, the coastal stretch from Vík (the Oslofjord area and the Skagerrak coast) in the south to Hálogaland (the northern Atlantic coast, roughly from Namdalen to present-day Troms, and beyond) consisted of shifting alliances and persistent hostility among groups whose political loyalties were tied to smaller fylki (districts). As far as historians can determine, none before him had ever asserted that these separate districts ought to form a single political unit—the entity later called the Kingdom of Norway. That claim built, however, on an already older conception of Norðvegr (the North Way) as a maritime transit route and a shared sociocultural landscape, inhabited by people known as "Northmen"—the common appellation for "Norwegians" in each of the North Germanic languages (to wit, Norwegian, Danish, Swedish, Icelandic, and Faroese)—alongside other peoples, notably the Sámi.

At the peak of Norwegian expansion before the civil war (1130–1240), Sigurd I led the Norwegian Crusade (1107–1110). The crusaders won battles in Lisbon and the Balearic Islands. In the Siege of Sidon they fought alongside Baldwin I and Ordelafo Faliero, and the siege resulted in an expansion of the Kingdom of Jerusalem. Leif Erikson, an Icelander of Norwegian origin and official hirdman of King Olaf I of Norway, explored America 500 years before Columbus. Adam of Bremen wrote about the new lands in Gesta Hammaburgensis ecclesiae pontificum (1076) when meeting Sweyn I of Denmark, but no other sources indicate that this knowledge went farther into Europe than Bremen, Germany. The Kingdom of Norway was the second European country after England to enforce a unified code of law to be applied for the whole country, called Magnus Lagabøtes landslov (1274).

The secular power was at its strongest at the end of King Haakon Haakonsson's reign in 1263. An important element of the period was the ecclesiastical supremacy of the archdiocese of Nidaros from 1152. There are no reliable sources for when Jämtland was placed under the archbishop of Uppsala. Uppsala was established later, and was the third metropolitan diocese in Scandinavia after Lund and Nidaros. The church participated in a political process both before and during the Kalmar Union that aimed at Swedish side, to establish a position for Sweden in Jämtland. This area had been a borderland in relation to the Swedish kingdom, and probably in some sort of alliance with Trøndelag, just as with Hålogaland.

== History ==
=== Expansion and unification ===
From the 600s Western Norwegian fish farmers began an exodus to the nearby islands in the North Sea, Orkney and Shetland, and then later to the Western Isles, like the Hebrides and the Isle of Man, and westward to the Faroe Islands, Iceland, and Greenland. Some of these islands were inhabited when the Norwegians arrived, but the local population was displaced or assimilated by the Norwegian immigrants.

Consistently, the islands' populations had a Norwegian ancestry, who kept in touch with the homeland over the North Sea. These Norwegians had their own chiefs or kings in the Norwegian tradition, subject to Norwegian royal power when it eventually developed a centralized state. Often, Norwegian kings had enough to contend with on the mainland, so the local power in the villages was often in the hands of local jarls who operated on behalf of the king.

Holdings in Sweden were in varying degrees Norwegian. By the 9th and 10th centuries, it is reasonable to assume that the population of Båhuslen, Jämtland and Herjedalen had no national affiliation to Norway, Svealand, or Götaland. It lay to the increasingly centralized monarchy to create this, which had to consolidate its right in the border areas above the neighboring kingdoms. Norway was then the first to integrate these areas into its kingdom.

=== Civil War Era ===
The civil war era began in 1130 and ended in 1240. In this period of Norwegian history, some two dozen rival kings and pretenders waged wars to claim the throne. The Civil War period can be divided into phases: the first phase was sporadic strife between the kings from 1130 to the second phase, where there were extensive battles between them from 1160 to 1184; and the final phase in which the Birkebeiners defeated the rest in 1240.

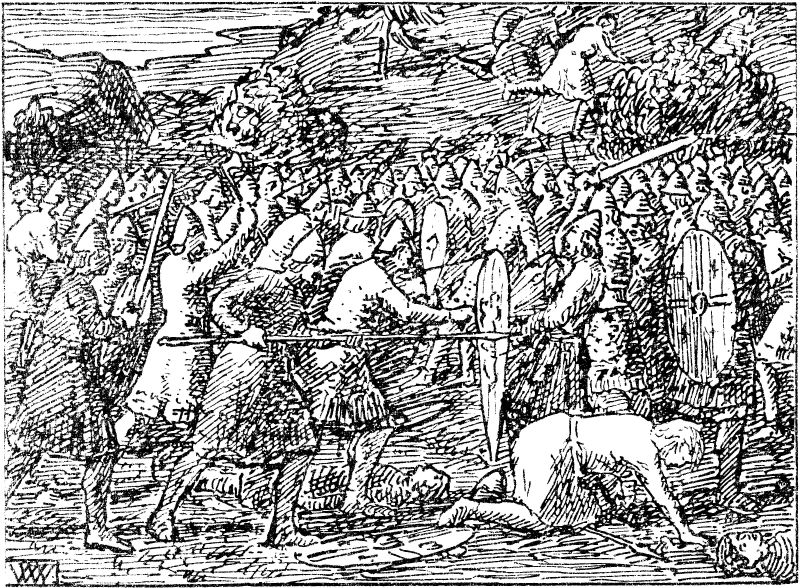
Battle of Minne (1137) between the armies of Sigurd Slembe and Inge Krokrygg.

In the absence of formal laws governing claims to rule, men who had proper lineage and wanted to be king came forward and entered into peaceful, if still fraught, agreements to let one man be king, set up temporary lines of succession, take turns ruling, or share power simultaneously. In 1130, with the death of King Sigurd the Crusader, his possible half-brother, Harald Gillekrist, broke an agreement that he and Sigurd had made to pass the throne to Sigurd's only son, the bastard Magnus. Already on bad terms before Sigurd's death, the two men and the factions loyal to them went to war.

In the first decades of the civil wars, alliances shifted and centered on the person of a king or pretender. However, towards the end of the 12th century, two rival parties, the Birkebeiner and the Bagler emerged. In their competition for power, the legitimacy dimension retained its symbolic power, but it was bent to accommodate the parties' pragmatic selection of effective leaders to realize their political aspirations. When they reconciled in 1217, a more ordered and codified governmental system gradually freed Norway from wars to overthrow the lawful monarch. In 1239, Duke Skule Bårdsson became the third pretender to wage war against King Håkon Håkonsson. Duke Skule was defeated in 1240, bringing more than 100 years of civil wars to an end.

=== End of self-rule ===
After the extinction of the male lines of the perceived Fairhair dynasty in 1319, the throne of Norway passed through matrilineal descent to Magnus VII, who in the same year became elected as king of Sweden too. In 1343 Magnus had to abdicate as King of Norway in favour of his younger son, Haakon VI of Norway. The oldest son, Eric, was explicitly removed from the future line of succession of Norway. Traditionally Norwegian historians have interpreted this clear break with previous successions as stemming from dissatisfaction among the Norwegian nobility with Norway's junior position in the union. However it may also be the result of Magnus' dynastic policies. He had two sons and two kingdoms and might have wished they should inherit one each, rather than start battling over the inheritance. Magnus was at the same time attempting to secure Eric's future election as King of Sweden.

The Black Death of 1349–1351 was a contributing factor to the decline of the Norwegian monarchy as the noble families and population in general were gravely affected. But the most devastating factor for the nobility and the monarchy in Norway was the steep decline in income from their holdings. Many farms were deserted and rents and taxes suffered. This left the Norwegian monarchy weakened in terms of manpower, noble support, defence ability and economic power. The Black Death ended up depleting the population by 65%, from roughly 350,000 to 125,000.

After the death of Haakon VI of Norway in 1380, his son Olav IV of Norway succeeded to both the thrones of Norway and Denmark and also claimed the Kingdom of Sweden, holding its westernmost provinces already. Only after his death at the age of 17 his mother Margaret managed to oust their rival, king Albert, from Sweden, and thus united the three Scandinavian kingdoms in personal union under one crown, in the Kalmar Union. Olav's death extinguished yet one Norwegian male royal line; he was also the last Norwegian king to be born on Norwegian soil for the next 567 years.

After the death of Olav IV of Norway in 1387, the closest in line to the succession was the Swedish king Albert of Mecklenburg. However, his succession was politically unacceptable to the Norwegians and Danes. Next in line were the descendants of the Sudreim lineage, legitimate descendants of Haakon V of Norway's illegitimate, but recognized daughter Agnes Haakonardottir, Dame of Borgarsyssel.

However, the candidate from this lineage renounced his claim to the throne in favour of Eric of Pomerania, Queen Margaret's favoured candidate. The succession right of this lineage resurfaced in 1448 after the death of King Christopher, but the potential candidate, Sigurd Jonsson, again renounced his candidature (see Sudreim claim). Eric's succession was one in a line of successions which did not precisely follow the laws of inheritance, but excluded one or a few undesirable heirs, leading to Norway formally becoming an elective kingdom in 1450.

== Mainland ==
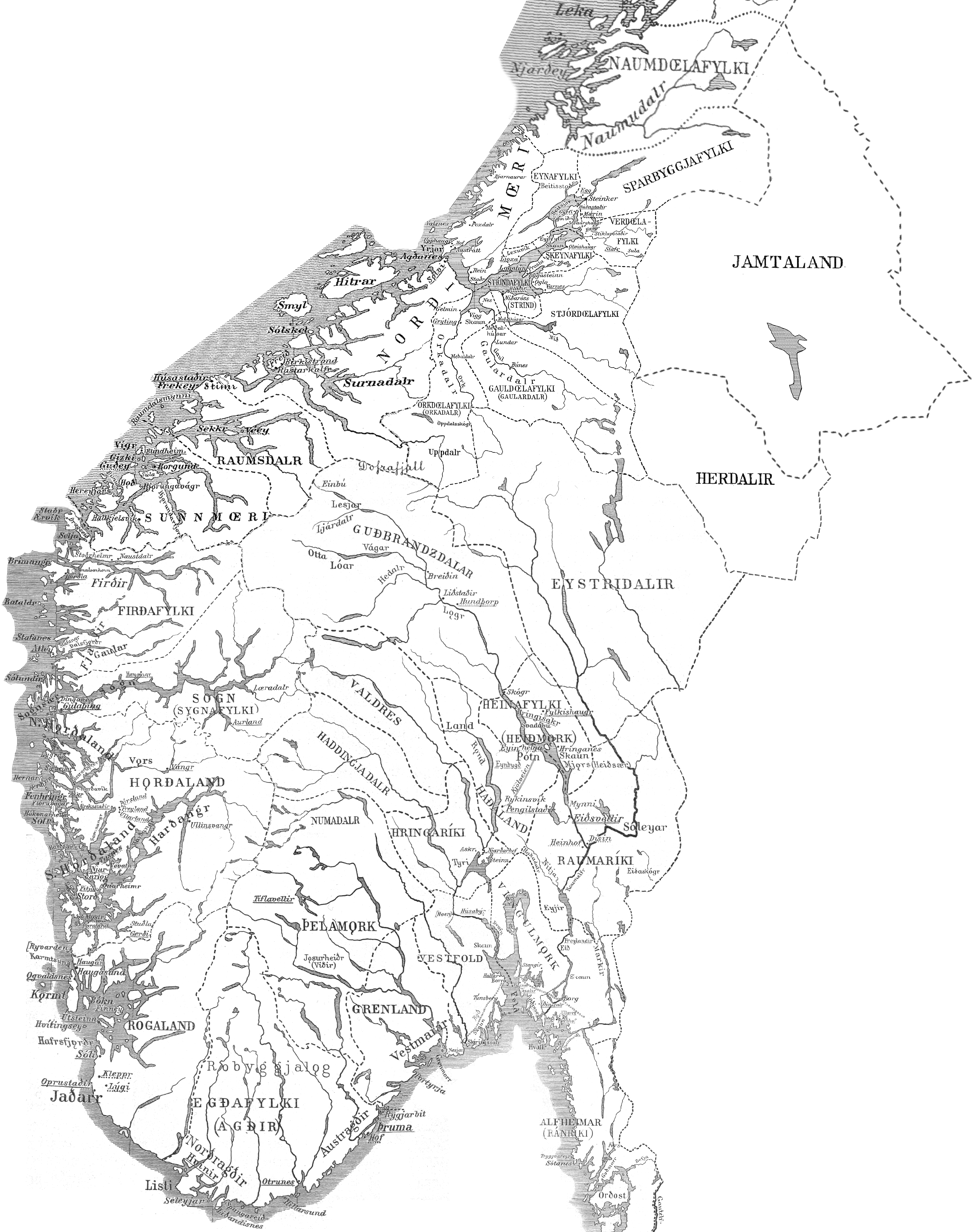
Southern part of mainland Norway

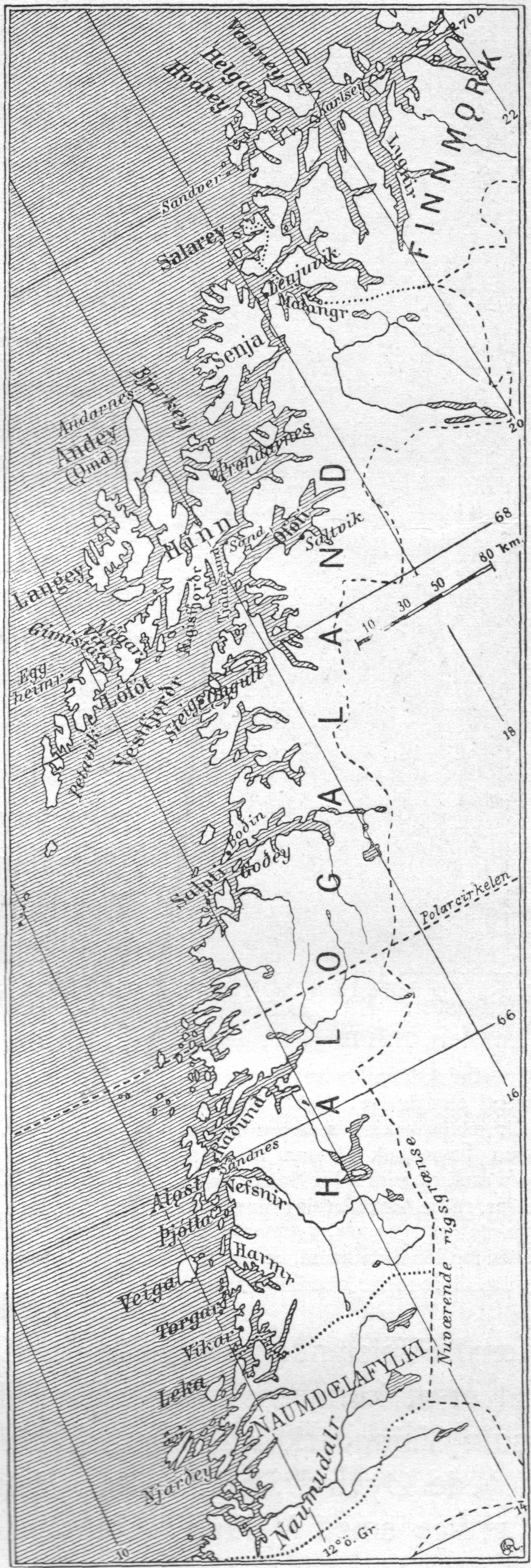
Northern part of mainland Norway

=== Administrative divisions ===
Viken, counties under Borgarþing:

- Ránríki
- Vingulmǫrk
- Vestfold
- Grenafylki (extending to Tvedestrand)

Oppland, counties under Heiðsævisþing:

- Heinafylki (current day Hedmarken and Gjøvik)
- Haðafylki (consisting of Hadeland, Land, Ringerike, and Toten)
- Raumaríki (consisting of Glåmdalen, and Romerike)
- Guðbrandsdalir
- Eystridalir (including Särna and Idre)

Vestlandet, counties under Gulaþing:

- Sunnmǿrafylki
- Firðafylki (consisting of Nordfjord and Sunnfjord)
- Sygnafylki
- Hǫrðafylki
- Rygjafylki
- Egðafylki
- Vǫlldres
- Haddingjadalr

Trøndelag, counties under Frostaþing:

- Raumsdølafylki
- Norðmǿrafylki
- Naumdølafylki
- Sparbyggjafylki
- Eynafylki
- Verdølafylki
- Skeynafylki
- Stjórdølafylki
- Strindafylki
- Gauldølafylki
- Orkdølafylki

Rest of Norway, counties not attached to a thing:

- Jamtaland
- Herdalir
- Háleygjafylki

=== Finnmark and Lapland ===
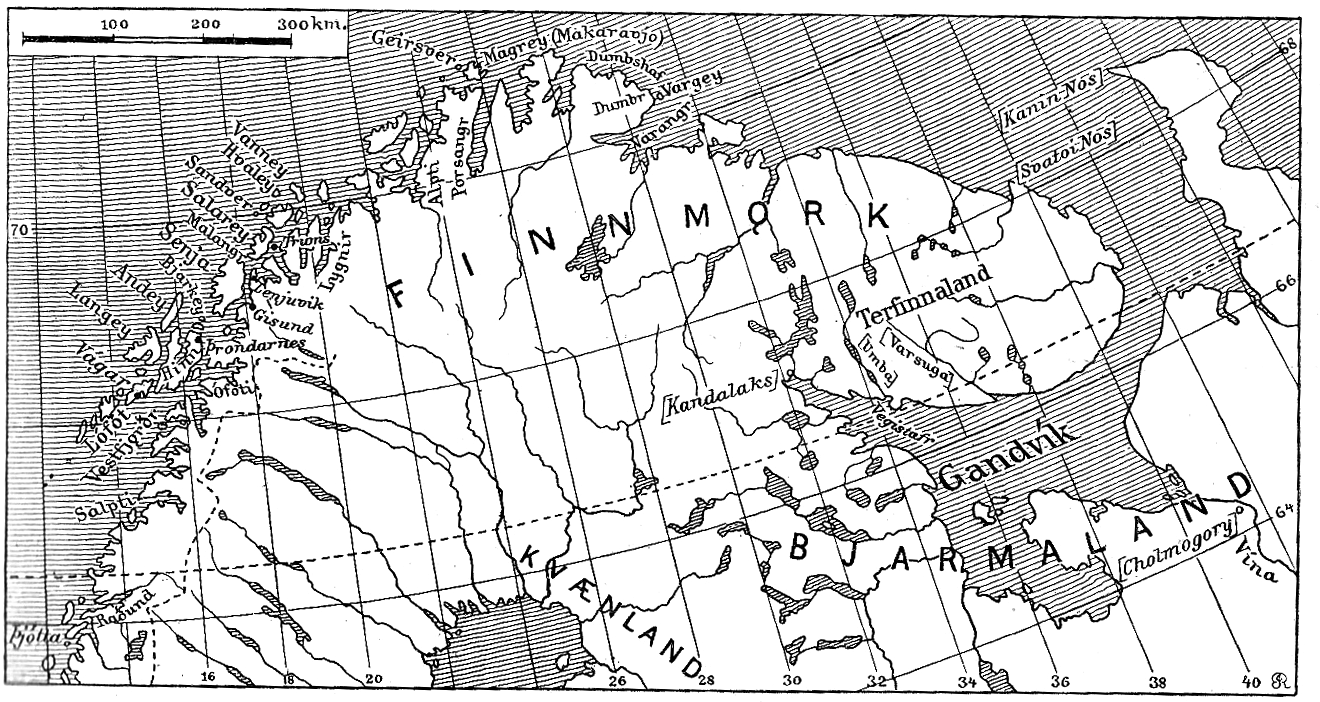
Tax territory of Finnmark, stretching over the Cap of the North.

Gjesvær in Nordkapp is mentioned in the Sagas (Heimskringla) as a northern harbor in the Viking Age, especially used by Vikings on the way to Bjarmaland (see Ottar from Hålogaland), and probably also for gathering food in the nearby seabird colony. Coastal areas of Finnmark were colonized by Norwegians beginning in the 10th century, and there are stories describing clashes with the Karelians. Border skirmishes between the Norwegians and the Russian city-state of Novgorod continued from the mid-13th century until 1326, when the Treaty of Novgorod settled the issue.

From the 11th century Olaf III of Norway regarded the borders of Norway as reaching to the White Sea. The first Norwegians started moving to Finnmark in the 13th century. Vardøhus Fortress was erected by Norway in 1306 further east than today's land border by King Haakon V Magnusson, supporting Norwegian land ownership. This is the world's most northern fortress. Finnmark derives from Finnmǫrk, and is the old Norwegian (Norrøn) description of the land of the Sami people, Sápmi.

=== Kola (Murmansk) ===
By the 13th century, a need to formalize the border between the Novgorod Republic and the Scandinavian countries became evident. The Novgorodians, along with the Karelians who came from the south, reached the coast of what now is Pechengsky District and the portion of the coast of Varangerfjord near the Voryema River, which now is a part of Norway. The Sami population was forced to pay tribute. The Norwegians, however, were also attempting to take control of these lands, resulting in armed conflicts.

In 1251, a conflict between the Karelians, Novgorodians and the servants of the king of Norway lead to the establishment of a Novgorodian mission in Norway. Also in 1251, the first treaty with Norway was signed in Novgorod regarding the Sami lands and the system of tribute collections, making the Sami people pay tribute to both Novgorod and Norway. By the terms of the treaty, the Novgorodians could collect tribute from the Sami as far as Lyngen fjord in the west, while the Norwegians could collect tribute on the territory of the whole Kola Peninsula except in the eastern part of Tersky Coast. No state borders were established by the 1251 treaty. There were also plans for Aleksandr Nevsky to marry a daughter of Haakon IV; however, according to the Hákonar saga Hákonarsonar: "the peace was not kept very long after".

The treaty lead to a short period of peace, but the armed conflicts resumed soon thereafter. Chronicles document attacks by the Novgorodians and the Karelians on Finnmark and northern Norway as early as 1271, and continuing well into the 14th century. The official border between the Novgorod lands and the lands of Sweden and Norway was established by the Treaty of Nöteborg on 12 August 1323. The treaty primarily focused on the Karelian Isthmus border and the border north of Lake Ladoga.

Another treaty dealing the matters of the northern borders was the Treaty of Novgorod signed with Norway in 1326, which ended the decades of the Norwegian–Novgorodian border skirmishes in Finnmark. Per the terms of this treaty, Norway relinquished all claims to the Kola Peninsula. A signed agreement regarding the taxation of the Kola Peninsula and Finnmark. No border line was drawn, creating a marchland where both countries held the right to taxation of the Sami people.

However, the treaty did not address the situation with the Sami people paying tribute to both Norway and Novgorod, and the practice continued until 1602. While the 1326 treaty did not define the border in detail, it confirmed the 1323 border demarcation, which remained more or less unchanged for the next six hundred years, until 1920.

== Overseas ==
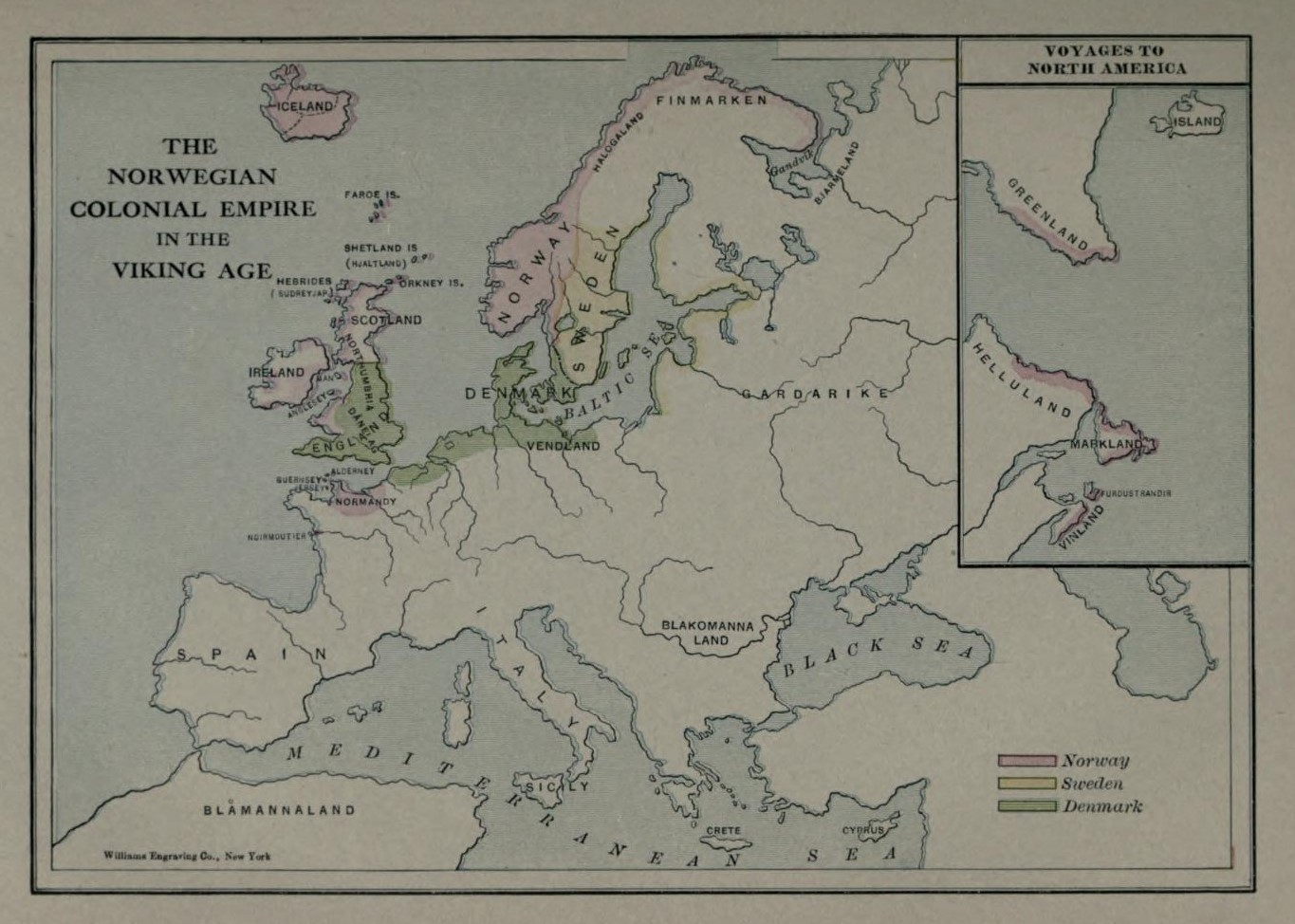
Norwegian Colonial Empire in the Viking Age, from Gjerset (1915), History of the Norwegian People

=== Crown dependencies ===
- Ísland (Iceland)
- Grǿnland (Greenland)
- Færeyjar (Faroe Islands)
- Mann (Isle of Man)
- Hjaltland (Shetland)
- Orkneyjar (Orkney Islands)
- Suðreyjar (The Hebrides)

Iceland, Faroe Islands and Greenland remained under Norwegian administration until 1814.

The treaty of Perth (1266) accepted Norwegian sovereignty over Shetland and Orkney; in turn Norway had to give the Hebrides and Isle of Man to Scotland.

=== Vassals ===
Vassals annexed by King Magnus III in 1098.

Ireland

- Dyflin (Kingdom of Dublin)

Scotland

- Katanes (Caithness), Suðrland (Sutherland) and Galloway.

Wales

- Anglesey (Note: As a result of the Norwegian victory in the Battle of Anglesey Sound in 1098 the Welsh considered the Norwegian soldiers as their liberators following Norway's victory against the Normans of England, and Magnus III regarded Anglesey as part of the Kingdom of the Isles and then took the island as a possession of Norway. Since the Norwegians never settled on the island, Anglesey reverted to Welsh control when Gruffudd ap Cynan returned from Ireland the year after in 1099.)

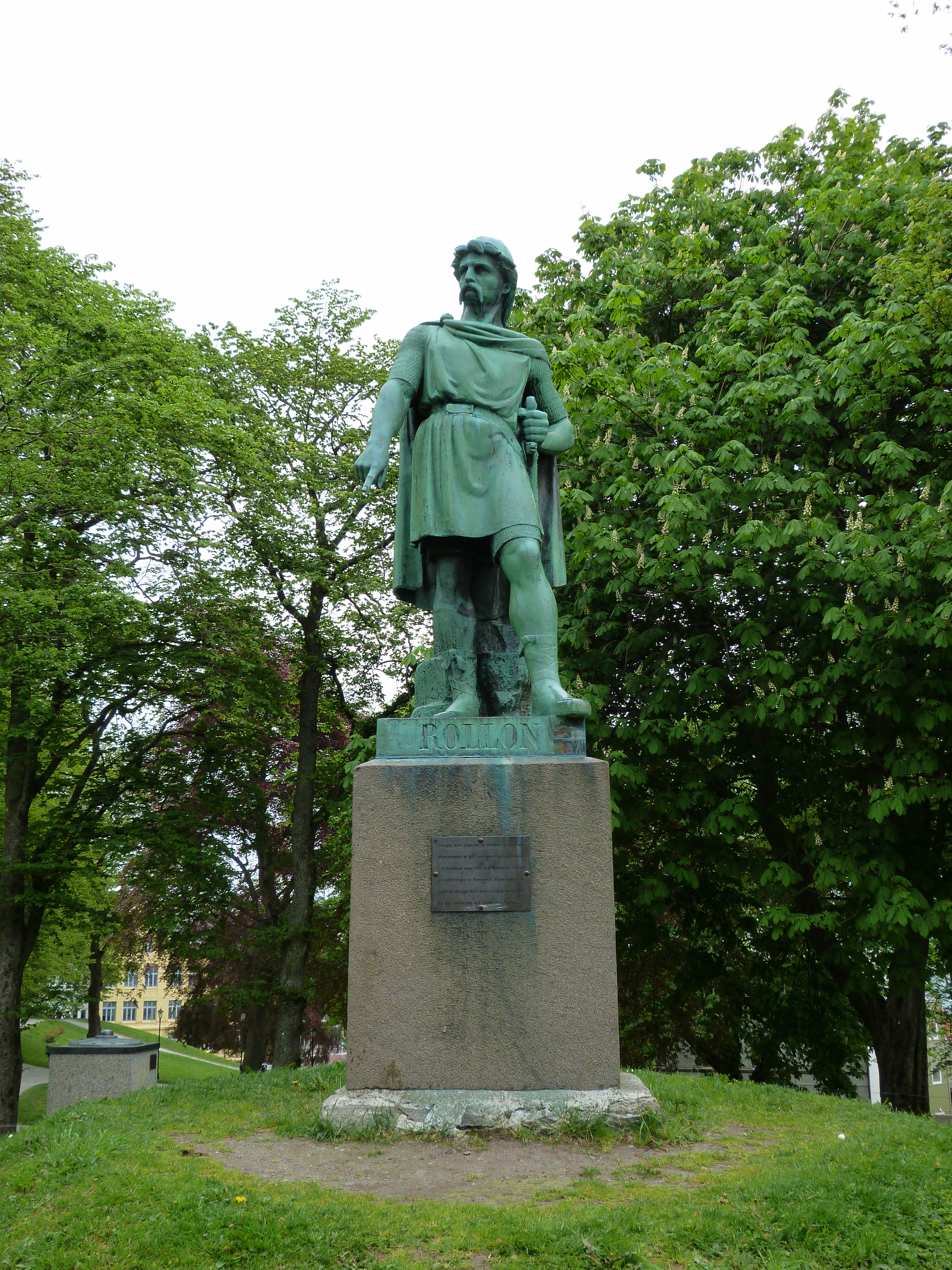
Statue of Rollo in Ålesund, Norway.

=== Areas governed by Norwegians independent from the Realm ===
England

- Northumbria

Eric I of Norway ruled Northumbria for two separate periods. Northumbria has also been ruled by Norway under Cnut the Great, as well as West Norse people of the British Isles. The most important city was called Jórvík (York).

France

- Normandy

The Duchy of Normandy was ruled by Norwegian and Danish Vikings, under the leadership of Rollo. Following extensive raids on Paris and vast areas in France, the duchy was founded in 911. The main purpose was to gain land for independent Vikings in this region, therefore Rollo swore a vassalage under France rather than Norway or Denmark. Although Rollo's ancestry is disputed, it is now common among British, French and Norwegian scientists to have the opinion that, judging from the sources and the possible two alternatives, more sources point to Norwegian ancestry. His descendant, William the Conqueror and his Norman army, would conquer England in 1066 after King Harald III of Norway had failed the same year.

Scotland

- Ross
- Moray

== Monarchs of the hereditary kingdom ==
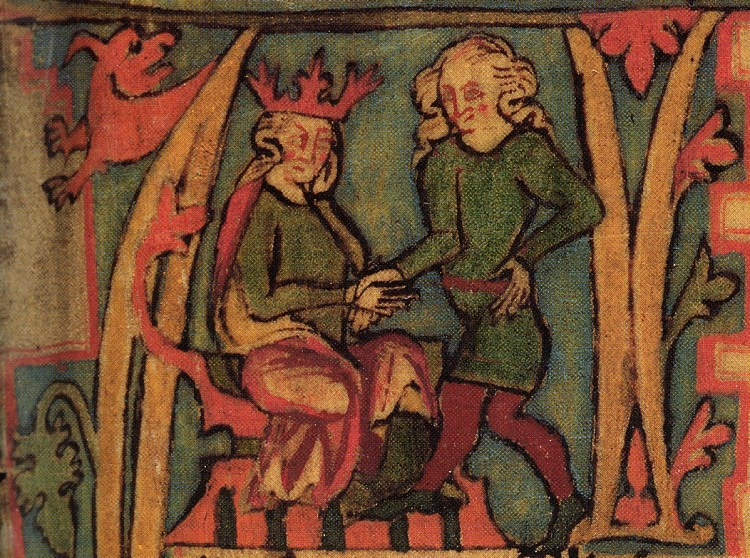
Haraldr Halfdansson, first monarch of the Fairhair dynasty

Yngling / Fairhair dynasty

- Harald I Halfdansson
- Eric I Haraldsson
- Haakon I Haraldsson
- Harald II Ericsson

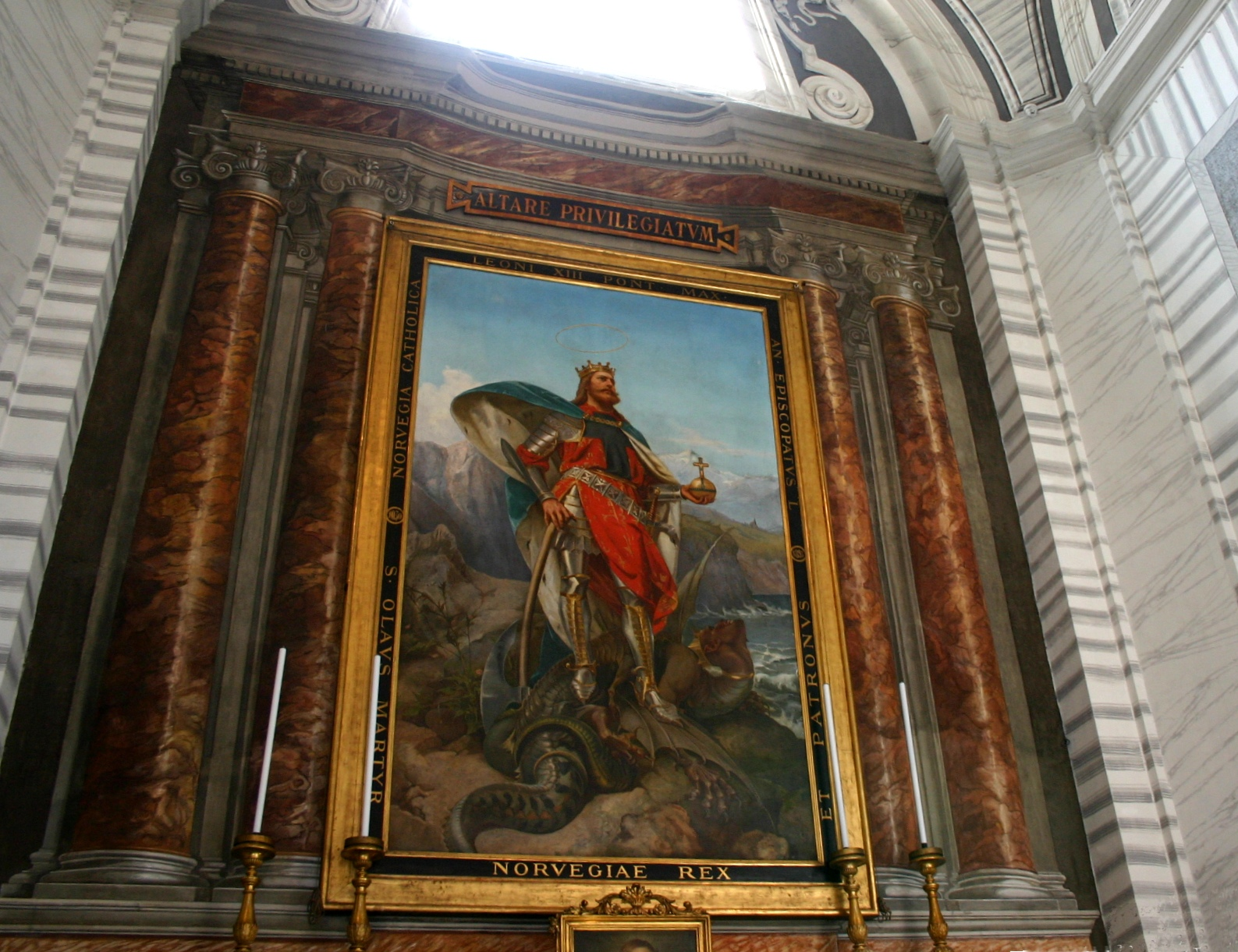
Painting of St. Olaf. Located in S. Carlo al Corso in Rome, Italy. – Pius Weloński, Sant'Olav di Norvegia (1893)

Lade dynasty

- Haakon Sigurdsson

Trygvason dynasty

- Olaf Tryggvason

Lade dynasty (restored)

- Eric Haakonsson and Sweyn Haakonsson

Saint Olaf dynasty

- Olaf II Haraldsson

Lade dynasty (restored, second time)

- Haakon Ericsson

Saint Olaf dynasty (restored)

- Magnus I Olafsson

Hardrada dynasty

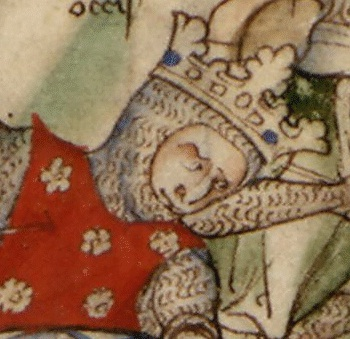
Haraldr Sigurðarson, first monarch of the Hardrada dynasty

- Harald Sigurdsson
- Magnus II Haraldsson
- Olaf III Haraldsson
- Haakon Magnusson
- Magnus III Olafsson
- Olaf IV Magnusson
- Eystein I Magnusson
- Sigurd I Magnusson
- Magnus IV Sigurdsson

Gille dynasty

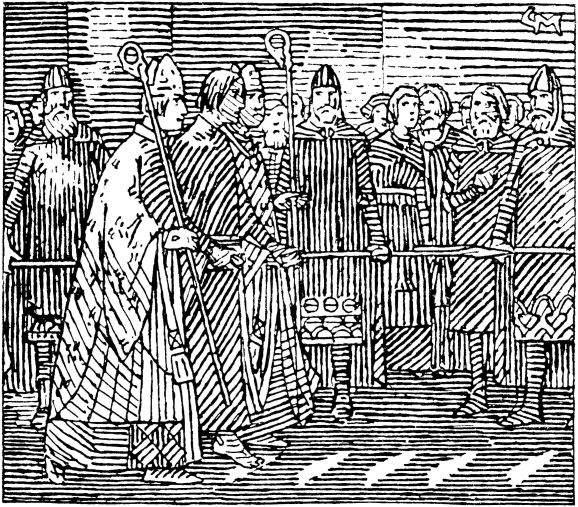
Haraldr Gilli, first monarch of the Gille dynasty

- Harald IV Magnusson
- Sigurd II Haraldsson
- Inge I Haraldsson
- Eystein II Haraldsson
- Magnus Haraldsson
- Haakon II Sigurdsson

Hardrada dynasty (female line)

- Magnus V Erlingsson

Sverre dynasty

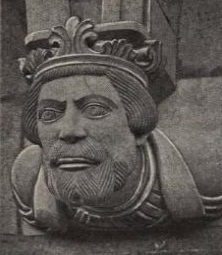
Sverrir Sigurðarson, first monarch of the Sverre dynasty

- Sverre I Sigurdsson
- Haakon III Sverresson
- Guttorm Sigurdsson

Gille dynasty (female line)

- Inge II Bårdsson

Sverre dynasty (restored)

- Haakon IV Haakonsson
- Haakon Haakonsson
- Magnus VI Haakonsson
- Eric II Magnusson
- Haakon V Magnusson
