= Norwegian law =

Norwegian law may refer to:

- Norwegian Law (Israel), a law on the appointment of ministers and membership of the Knesset
- Law of Norway, law in Norway
