= Law of Norway =

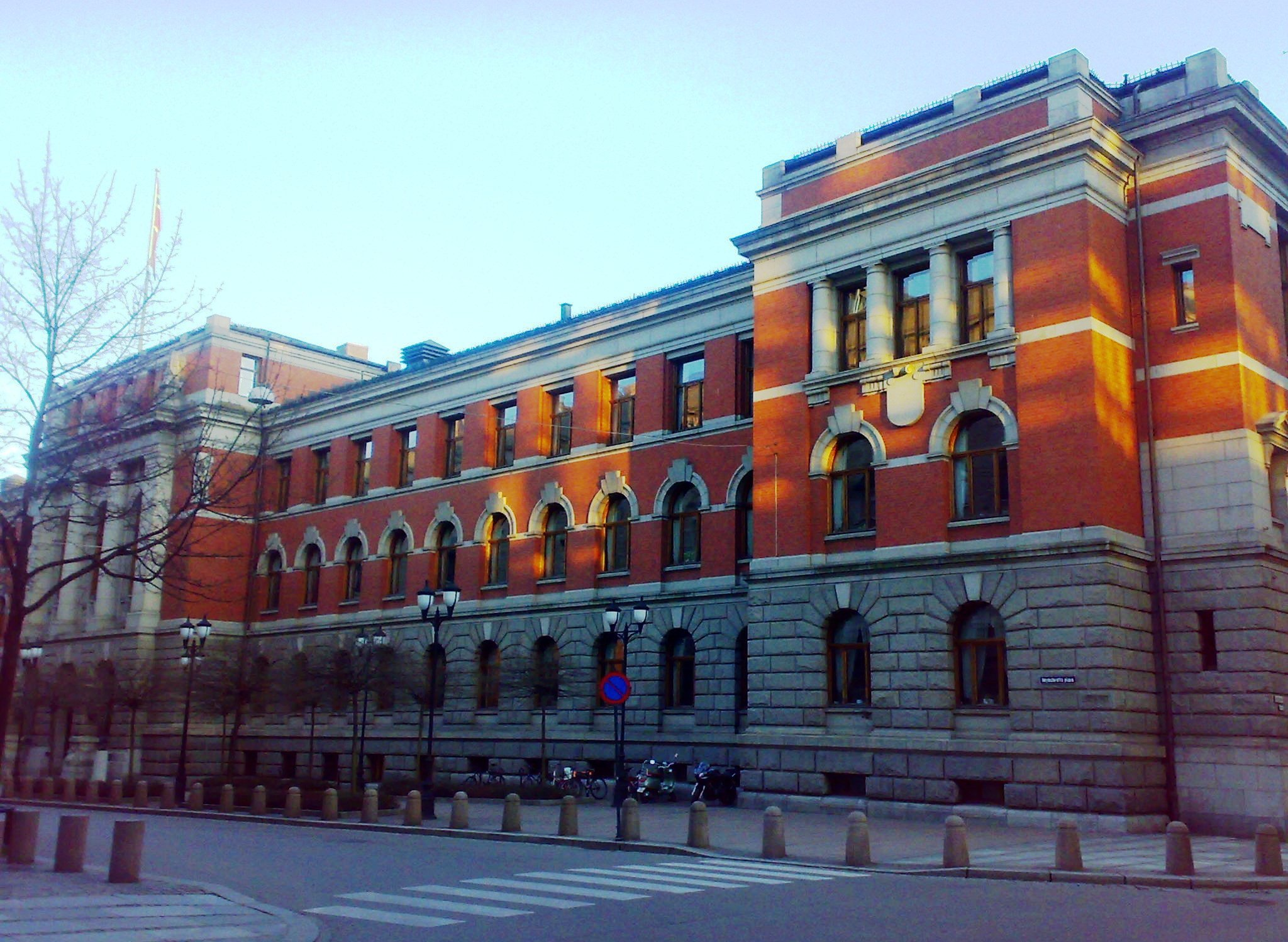
The Supreme Court of Norway building

Law in Norway follows a civil law system. The Supreme Court is the highest in the nation, with 20 justices.

== Overview ==
The highest level of law is the Constitution of 17 May 1814. Statutes made under the Constitution are subordinate to it. Regulations made under such a statute are subordinate to such law.

The first state-issued national Law-Code for Norway was Magnus Lagabøtes landslov (or the 'Code of the Norwegian Realm'), issued in 1274 by Magnus VI of Norway. It was followed in 1276 by the Magnus Lagabøtes bylov, issued by the same king.

The Constitution of Norway was adopted on 16 May 1814 by the Norwegian Constituent Assembly at Eidsvoll.

Norwegian law, as well as the other Scandinavian legal systems, differ from their civil law continental counterparts by assigning a very high value on jurisprudence. Especially in private law, large parts of legal development are left to the Supreme Court. As an example, areas such as ordinary contract law are scarcely legislated by the Storting. Norwegian law, unlike many other civil law systems, are not codified in systematic codes. Although an attempt at codification was in the works from 1953 to 1999, the project was subsequently disbanded.

The Norwegian legal framework also reflects extensive harmonization with international and European legal standards, particularly through its participation in the European Economic Area (EEA), while retaining distinctive elements in areas such as contract formation, commercial agency regulation, and construction law standards.

== See also ==
- Judiciary of Norway
- Oslo Courthouse

== Sources ==
- Bertnes, Pål A. In Winterton and Moys (eds). Information Sources in Law. Second Edition. Bowker-Saur. 1997. Chapter 20: Norway. Pages 341–361.
