= Frostating Law =

Ancient Norwegian law

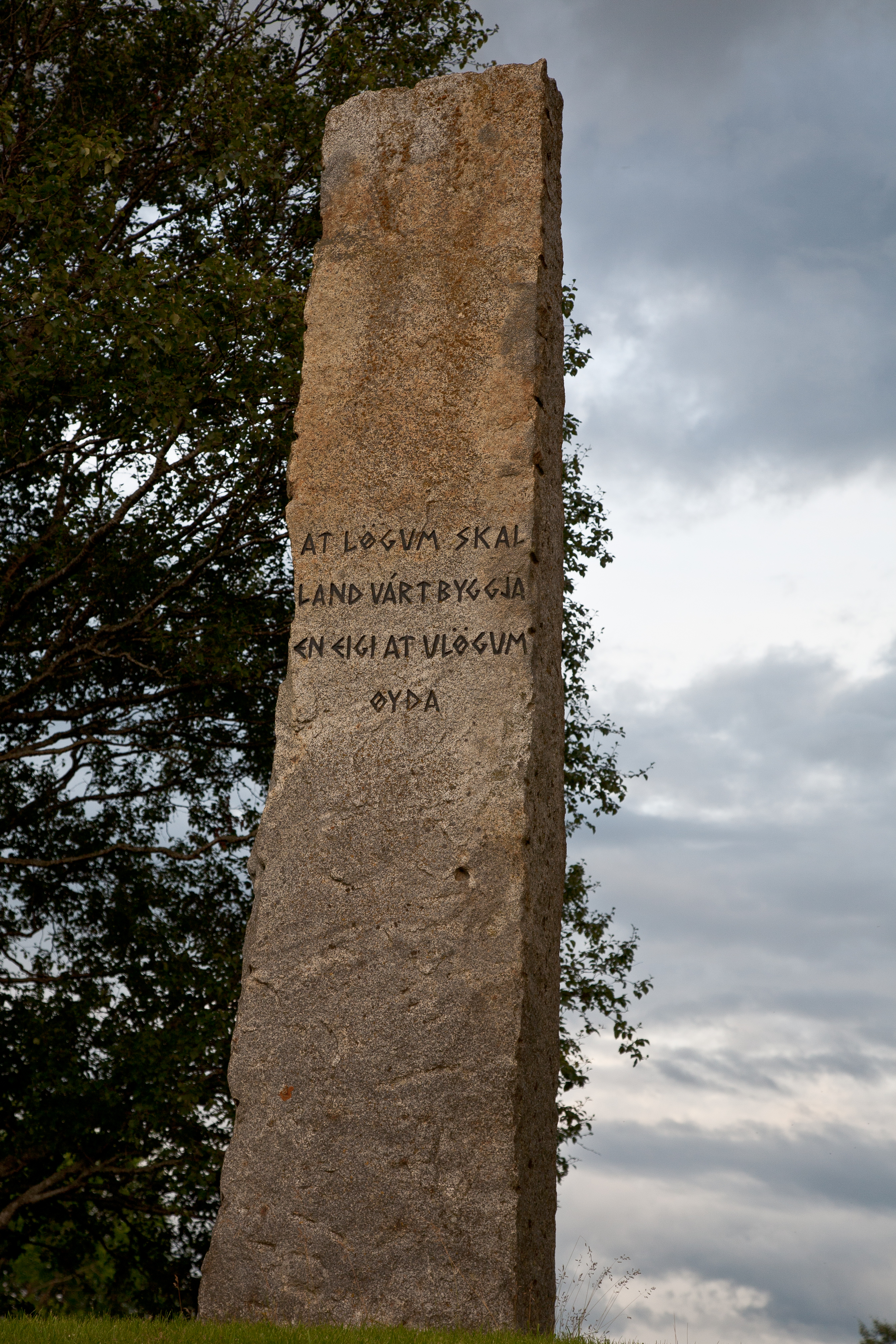
Stone monument in Frosta Municipality

Frostating law (Norwegian: Frostatingsloven) is one of Norway's oldest laws. It concerned the Frostating, which covered large parts of Norway, and derives its name from the ancient court at Frostating. The most famous quote from this law is "at lögum skal land várt byggja en eigi at ulögum øyða" (with law shall our land be built, and not desolated by lawlessness) which also appears in a number of Norse laws, and is inscribed on the illustrated memorial.

== History ==
It was not the oldest law, which are the Eidsivating law and the Gulating law. Later came the Borgathinglaw of Olaf II (1015–1028) but the Frostathing law has been much better preserved, the earlier laws only preserving that which pertained to church law. Together with the Bjarkøy law, these are collectively referred to as the provincial laws.

The version that has come down to us dates from around 1260 in the time of Håkon Håkonsson (1217–1263), who inscribed the first chapter with introductory amendments, although portions of the law are likely to be several hundred years older than that. Originally they existed only in oral form at meetings of the Thing. It is first mentioned in the collection of old Norse Sagas by Snorri Sturluson known as the Heimskringla, specifically the Saga of Håkon the Good. Snorri also refers to the later role of Olaf II. In 1280 the Thing more formally adopted the law and Magnus the Good (1035–1047) asked that it be written down. It became known as "Grágás" (Gray Goose), but was quite distinct from the Icelandic Gray Goose Laws (Grágás). This law was progressively modified over time, one of the more important developments in the evolution of Norwegian law being the work of Magnus the Lawmender (1263–1280), for which he was nicknamed 'lawmender'.

The Håkon Håkonsson version is also known as the Codex Resenianus, after the historian Peder Hansen Resen who gave the only surviving version to the University of Copenhagen (unfortunately later destroyed in the 1728 fire at the Copenhagen Library). In Norwegian it is found in the Norges gamle Love (I, 121–258) as Den ældre Frostathings-Lov. A modern Nynorsk edition was published in 1994.

== Church law ==
The sections dealing with Church law appear to be derived from an older compilation known as the Gullfjǫðr (Goldfeather) by Archbishop Eystein, who sought to bring Norwegian church law in line with the canon law of Gratian.

== See also ==
- Gulating

== Bibliography ==
- Frostatingslova. Translated by Jan Ragnar Hagland and Jørn Sandnes. Samlaget, 1994. (Norrøne bokverk). ISBN 82-521-4322-9
- Jørn Sandnes. "Slaget på Stiklestad i lys av Frostatingslovens motstandsbestemmelser" (The Battle of Stiklestad), in Årbok for Nord-Trøndelag historielag 1992
- Sverre Bagge. "Kirken, bøndene og motstandsretten i Norge i middelalderen". (The Church, the farmers and opposition rights in Norway in the Middle Ages) Historisk tidsskrift No 3, 2005
- Jørn Sandnes. «Engi maðr skal atfor at oðrum gera, noen merknader til motstandsbestemmelsene i Frostatingsloven». I Historisk tidsskrift No 2, 2006
- Adam von Bremen: Bischofsgeschichte der Hamburger Kirche (History of the Archbishops of Hamburg-Bremen). In: Quellen des 9. und 11. Jahrhunderts zur Geschichte der Hamburger Kirche und des Reichs. pp. 138–495. Freiherr vom Stein -Gedächtnisausgabe XI. Darmstadt 1978. English translation by F.J. Tschan, Columbia University Press, 2002, ISBN 0-231-12575-5.
- Jón F. Hjálmarsson: Die Geschichte Islands. Reykjavík 1994.
- Rudolf Keyser, P.A. Munch (Hrg.): Norges gamle love indtil 1387. Förste Bind. Christiania 1846.
- Rudolf Meißner (Übs.): Norwegisches Recht. Das Rechtsbuch des Frostothings. In: Germanenrechte Bd. 4. Weimar 1939.
- Sini Kangas, Mia Korpiola, Tuija Ainonen (eds.) Authorities in the Middle Ages: Influence, Legitimacy, and Power in Medieval Society. Walter de Gruyter, 2013 ISBN 9783110294569
