= Treaty of Novgorod (1326) =

Treaty regarding the Kola Peninsula

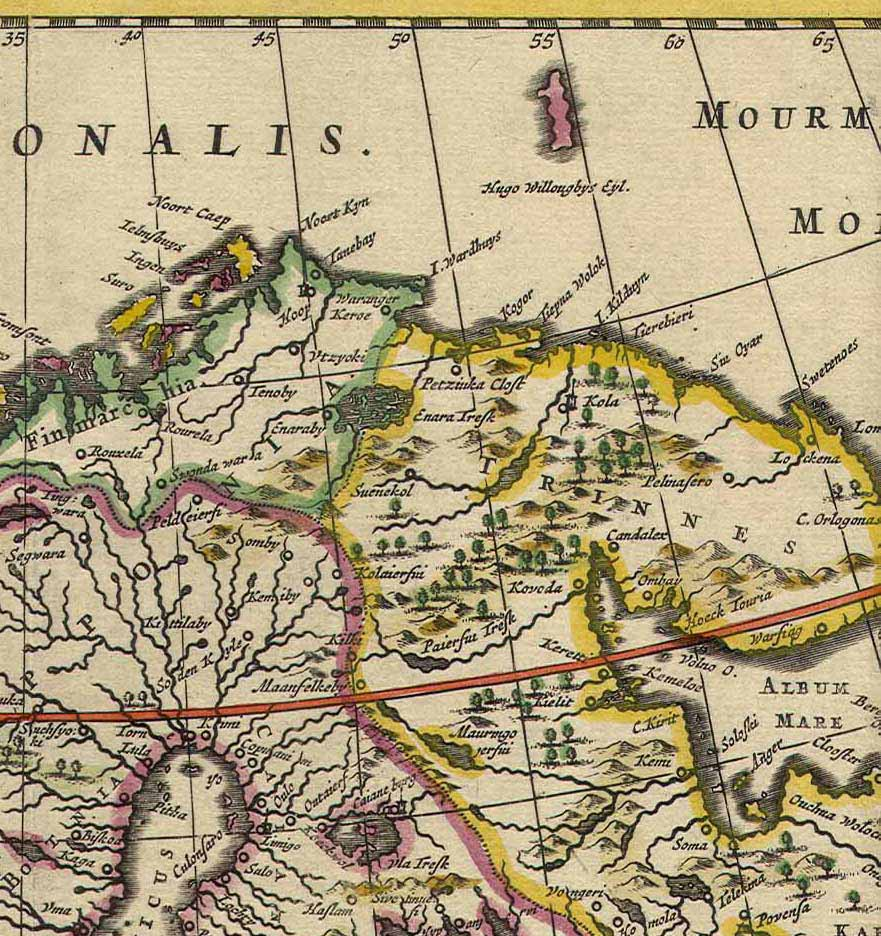
- Dutch map of Finnmark (1660), showing the northern regions of Norway, Sweden and Russia.
- Signed: 3 June 1326
- Location: Novgorod
- Parties: Novgorod Republic; Kingdom of Norway

The Treaty of Novgorod (Russian: Новгородско-норвежский договор, romanized: Novgorodsko-norvezhskiy dogovor; Norwegian: Novgorod-traktaten) was a 10-year peace treaty signed on 3 June 1326 in Novgorod. It marked the end of decades of border skirmishes between Norway and Novgorod in the far northern region of Finnmark. A few years earlier, in 1323, Novgorod had settled its conflict with Sweden in the Treaty of Nöteborg.

== Background ==
The city-state of Novgorod expanded northward and northeastward, and by 1137, its list of pogosty showed that it had established strongholds along the Onega, Sukhona, and Vaga rivers. The population along the Pechora was also subject to taxation no later than 1187. By the late 12th or early 13th century, this may have extended to the southern shores of the Kola Peninsula. The subjects of Novgorod included the Karelians, but later included the Sámi. As a result of Swedish expansion, the region inhabited by the Karelians was divided between the two powers, and accordingly, between the Western Catholic Church and the Russian Orthodox Church.

The eastern Karelians enjoyed a special position within the Russian taxation system compared to the other Baltic Finnic peoples. They were independent in their relations with the Sámi, but from the 13th century onward, they had to pay a fee for their economic undertakings with them. There were also Karelians who collected taxes from the Sámi on behalf of Novgorod. Many references to "Russian merchants" conducting business or acting on behalf of Russian interests in this period concern individuals of Karelian background.

Norwegian expansion at the turn of the 13th century led to competition between the two powers over control of the region, particularly in the collection of taxes from the Sámi. The first mention of an attempt to reach a mutual agreement is dated to 1250–1251, when Aleksandr Nevsky visited Haakon IV and concluded a peace treaty. There were also plans for Aleksandr to marry a daughter of Haakon; however, according to the Hákonar saga Hákonarsonar: "the peace was not kept very long after". The next time a peace treaty was signed was in 1326. In addition, an undated note from the 1330s delineated the border.

== Description ==
The treaty did not delineate the border but rather stipulated which part of the Sámi people would pay tribute to Norway and which to Novgorod, creating a kind of buffer zone in between the countries. The treaty remained in effect until the 19th century and was never abrogated by any of the powers. It eventually led into a situation where Sami people were freely exploited, some of them forced to pay taxes to all surrounding powers at the same time, including to the Birkarls from Swedish Finland.

== Aftermath ==
The border-delineating document dated to the 1330s mentions the presence of border markers, which allegedly specifies a common region for taxation, allowing both parties to collect taxes from the Sámi:

These are the border confines between the realms of the Norwegian king and of the Russian king, according to what old men have said, and according to what Norwegians and Sámi still say to day: the Russians have the right to collect tribute along the sea until the promontory of Lyngstuva and on the mountains until Mæleå, which lies due north of Lyngstuva and stretches eastwards towards the Keel [i.e. Norwegian term for the border mountains between Norway and Sweden]. But the king of Norway takes tribute eastwards until Trianæma and further inwards in Gandvik [i.e. the White Sea] until Veleaga, anywhere that there are half-Karelians or half-Sámi, who have been born to Sámi mothers. And from these outermost border regions shall not be collected more than 5 squirrel pelts from each bow [taxation unit], or according to old custom, if they will.

== Sources ==
- Hansen, Lars Ivar (2010). "The Arctic Dimension of 'Norgesveldet'". In Imsen, Steinar (ed.). The Norwegian Domination and the Norse World, c. 1100 – c. 1400. Tapir Academic Press. pp. 230–249. ISBN 978-82-519-2563-1.
