= Birk (market place) =

Birk, birka, or birke (cf. Old Danish: biærk, berck, byrck, Danish: bjærke), also bjarkey (Norwegian: bjarkø, Swedish: björkö; lit. 'birch island', among more; see cf. bjarkey laws), was a Norse term for a type of trading hub during the Scandinavian Middle Ages, later a demarcated area, especially a town or a market place, with its own laws and privileges.

== Etymology ==
The term birk is really just the word "birch", a variation of the common normalization bjǫrk (also bjærk, bjørk, bjork, bjark, etc) in Old Norse. Trees held strong cultural value in European pre-history, which likely played a role in coining the term. Forms like birka, birke, birkø (bjarkey) are derivatives which may likely predate the shortform birk for the specific sense. The Swedish Academy states that the Swedish descendant birk derive from the preceding form birka.

An early example showing the etymology is Primorsk, Leningrad Oblast, which Old Swedish name is berkö (now björkö, "birch island"). The corresponding Finnish name is Koivisto, meaning "birch grove", corresponding to the Swedish related analog term birke ("birch grove, birch lumber"). The corresponding Old East Slavic name is Beryozovskoye (Берёзовское, береза + -ское, lit. 'birch settlement').

== Denmark ==
In Denmark, the name was used for areas were exempted from the ordinary jurisdictions of the hundreds and the towns. There were royal, ecclesiastical and aristocratic birks with their own law courts and birk assemblies. After the Protestant Reformation, the ecclesiastical birks passed to the king.

The royal birks were after some time abolished, but more and more aristocratic ones were established, where the aristocratic landlord (the patronus) appointed birk judges, birk bailiffs, and birk notaries. The aristocratic birk privilege (known by the same name as Bjarkey laws, birkerett) was reduced in 1809 and it was completely abolished in 1849. The term birk was to endure for some time, however.

== Norway ==
In Norway, some counties, baronies and noble estates also had birk privileges, but they were abolished in 1821.

== Sweden and Finland ==
Sweden and Finland have many historical placenames named birk-, björkö-, or thereof. The most famous example is the Viking town Birka located in Mälaren, active between 750–975. Other notable places includes: Björköby, Vetlanda (Sweden), Björköby, Vaasa (Finland), Björkö/Berkö, Leningrad Oblast (Russia), among many more.

The term birkarl, a type of historical merchant, is assumed to stem from birk (birk-karl, "birk-man").

== Sources ==
- The article Birk in Nationalencyklopedin.

== See also ==
- Birkarls
