= Magnus Lagabøtes landslov =

13th-century Norwegian law

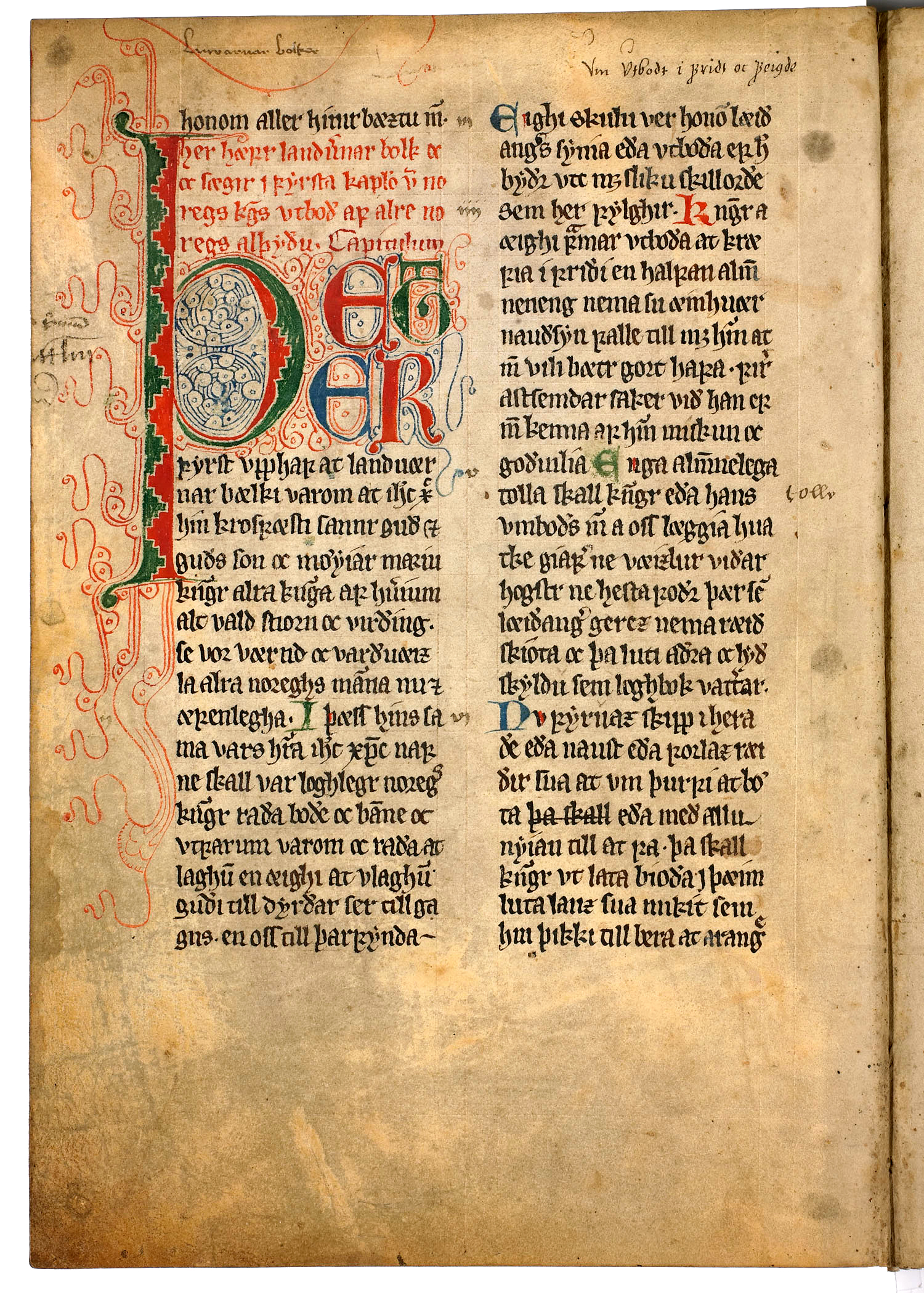
From the opening of the landevernsbolken in Magnus Lagabøtes landslov, from manuscript AM 305 fol, folio 10v, copied by Torgeir Håkonsson c. 1300.

Magnus Lagabøtes landslov (lit. 'Magnus the Lawmender's Law of the Land') was a law covering the whole of Norway, issued by King Magnus VI of Norway, constituted by the regional courts (cf. Things) between 1274 and 1276. The law was the first to apply to Norway as a whole and is one of the first examples of comprehensive national legislation from a central authority in all of Europe. The law is the reason that the king was given the name Lagabøte, "the one who improves the law". Albeit mending the law, with this much more detailed formulation of the law into written text, codification, the law-giving power was to a great extent taken away from the popular assemblies, these higher level regional things (Borgarting, Eidsivating, Gulating and Frostating), by King Magnus VI. He managed to circumvent the traditional authority of these traditional things by the elaboration and codification of the Bjarkeyjarréttr, laws and things for the market-places, cities and towns with trade-rights, also temporary markets (cf: Birk (market place) and Bjarkey laws) that eventually made the cities (Nidaros which is Trondheim, Bergen, Tønsberg) independent from the traditional things (assemblies).

== Characteristics ==
Although the legislation applied to the whole country, it formally consisted of four different law books, one for each of the four jurisdictions (Gulating, Frostating, Eidsivating and Borgarting). However, the content of the four statutes was largely similar and was based primarily on the previous jurisdictional laws. In addition, a separate City Law, Magnus Lagabøtes bylov, was issued for the cities, from 1276.

The preparation of a shared law strengthened the central authorities and the king's power. This led to reactions, especially from the Church. Archbishop Jon Raude in Nidaros opposed the king intervening in the ecclesiastical sphere and revising ecclesiastical legislation. There was a prolonged dispute between the king on the one hand and the church on the other side, which ended with a settlement and a compromise, called the Sættargjerden, in Tønsberg in 1277. The archbishop succeeded in securing the church a considerable tax deduction and greater legal privileges.

Large sections of the legislation were applicable for more than 400 years. It was revised and translated into Danish in 1604 and received the name Christian IVs Norske Lov ("Christian IV's Norwegian Law"), named after King Christian IV of Denmark. In 1687 the legislation was repealed and replaced by Christian Vs Norske Lov.

There were at least 41 copies or manuscripts of the State Law in circulation and it was the most widely used non-religious book in medieval Norway. There were large and small differences in the wording between the manuscripts, and this variation was known by those who used the manuscripts, as shown in the form of notes in the margins. According to Jørn Øyrehagen Sunde, the wording was not followed slavishly, and adapted to each individual case.

== Editions and translations ==
- Rudolf Keyser and P.A. Munch (eds.), Norges gamle love (1848)
- Rindal, Magnus, and Bjørg Dale Spørck, eds. Kong Magnus Håkonsson Lagabøtes landslov: Norrøn tekst med fullstendig variantapparat. Norrøne tekster, 9. Oslo: Riksarkivet, 2019. ISBN 978-8-25480-137-6. Much of this is also online at https://www.nb.no/forskning/lagabote/ressurser/.

== See also ==
- Medieval Scandinavian law

== Sources ==
- «Magnus Lagabøtes landslov», Store norske leksikon
- «Magnus Lagabøtes landslov», at Norgeshistorie.no
- «Forbrytelse og straff», at Norgeshistorie.no
