= Frostating =

Early Norwegian court

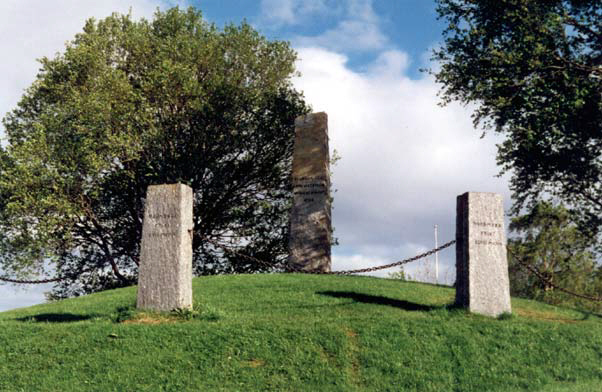
Tinghaugen at Frosta

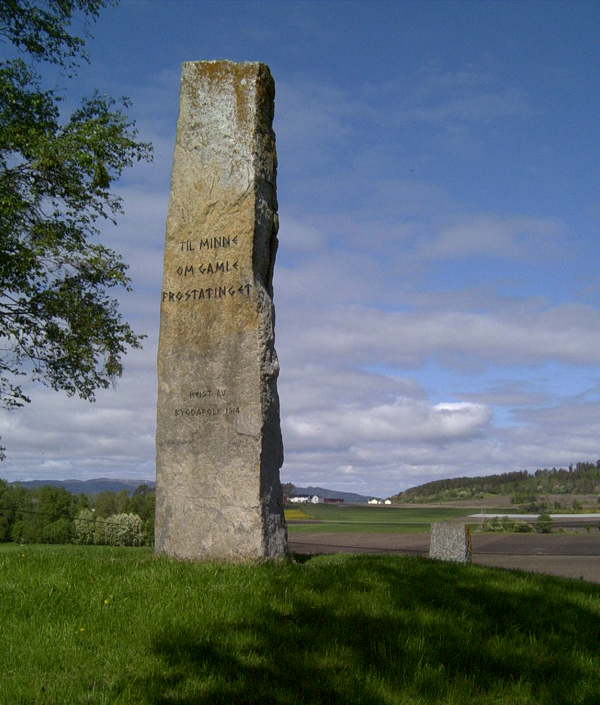
Frostatinget bautasten at Tinghaugen

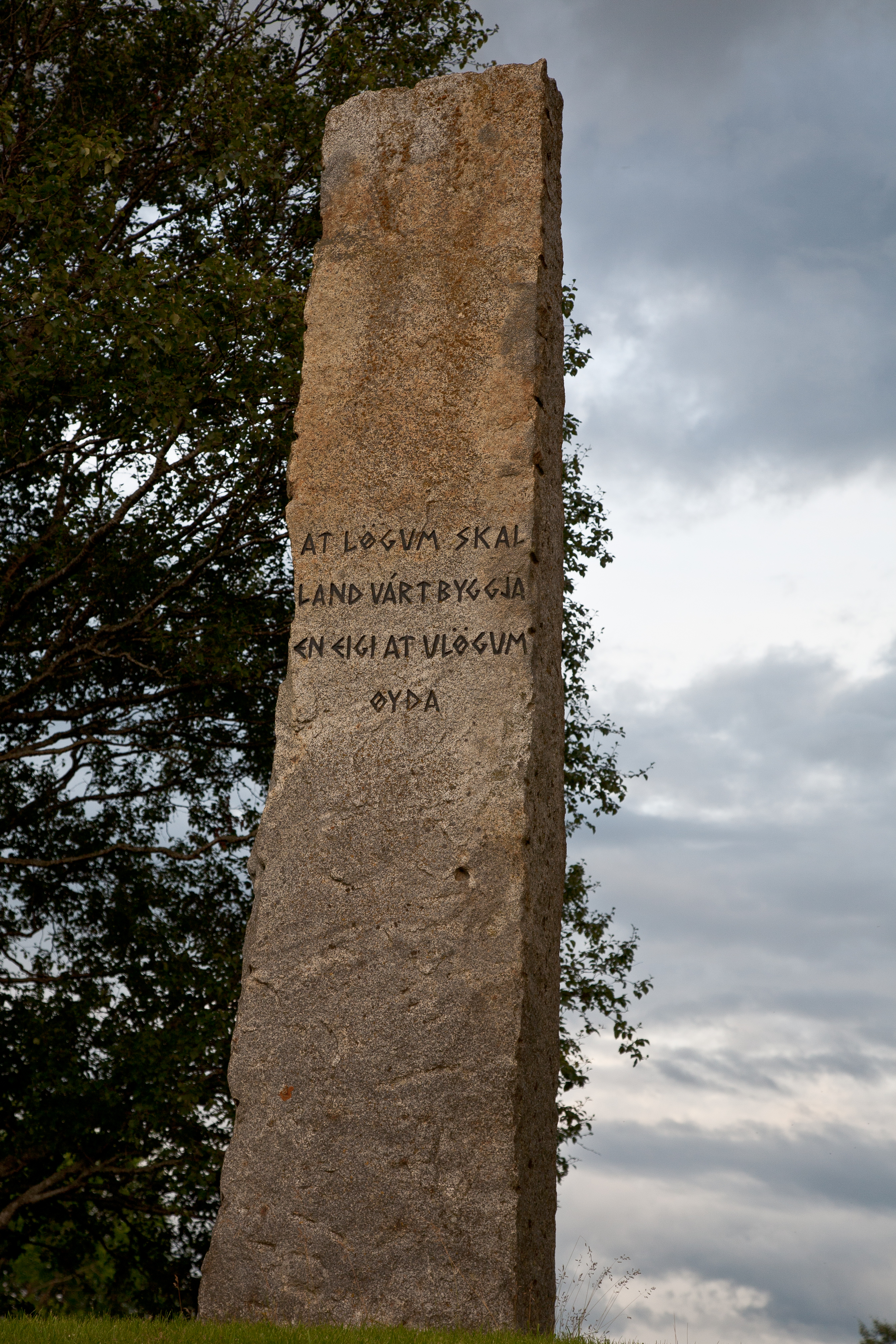
Inscription: at lögum skal land várt byggja en eigi at ulögum øyða (with law shall our land be built, and not desolated by lawlessness)

Frostating (Old Norse: Frostuþing) was one of the four ancient popular assemblies or things (lagting) of medieval Norway. Historically, it was the site of court and assembly for Trøndelag, Nordmøre, and Hålogaland. The assembly had its seat at Tinghaugen in what is now Frosta Municipality. It functioned as a judicial and legislative body, resolving disputes and establishing laws.

Frostating and Norway's three other ancient regional assemblies, the Borgarting, Eidsivating, and Gulating, were joined into a single jurisdiction during the late 13th century, when King Magnus the Lawmender had the existing body of law put into writing.

== Tinghaugen ==
Tinghaugen, from the Old Norse words þing meaning 'assembly' and haugr meaning 'hill', is close to the medieval church at Logtun. The site is represented by the Frostatinget bautasten at Tinghaugen. Frostating was arguably Norway's oldest court, pre-dating the Viking Age. The Frostating had authority over the eight districts in Trøndelag including Norðmørafylki (Nordmøre and Fosen) and Naumdølafylki (Namdalen) and at a later time, it also included Hålogaland. When Norway was united as a kingdom, the existing lagting (law assemblies) were constituted as superior regional assemblies, Frostating being one of them. These were representative assemblies at which delegates from the various districts in each region met to award legal judgments and pass laws.

== Magnus Lagabøtes landslov ==
The first seeds of democratic evolution appeared in matters of law. When Norway was united as a kingdom, the four independent lagting – Frostating, Gulating, Eidsivating, and Borgarting – were the most supreme bodies of law, acting as both legislative assemblies and courts. In 1274, with the consent of all lagting, King Magnus the Lawmender (1238–1280) promulgated a new national law (landslov), a unified code of laws for the Kingdom of Norway, which was exceptional of its time. With this, the Frostathing Law was replaced by the new law, significantly reducing the legislative power of the assembly, and centralising power in the realm.

A unified code of laws for a whole country had until then only been introduced in the Kingdom of Sicily in the Liber Augustalis promulgated in 1231 by Frederick II, Holy Roman Emperor and the Fuero Real compiled during the reign of Alfonso X of Castile.

The law remained in force until Frederik III, king of the Denmark–Norway, promulgated absolute monarchy in 1660. This was codified in the King Act of 1665 which functioned as the Constitution of Norway of the Union of Denmark-Norway until 1814.

== Frostating seal ==
The Frostating seal (Frostatingseglet) shows king Magnus the Lawmender seated on his throne and giving the lawman the new Frostating law (Frostatingslova) at the Frostating. The seal commemorates Magnus's great effort to modernise the law-code. The representatives to the Thing—three deep—stand on the king's left side. The king sits in the middle on his throne with a crown on his head and a scepter in his hand, and with the Norwegian lion under his foot. Below in the seal are two bowmen; one aiming at a squirrel while the other aims at a bird. Both the squirrel and the bird sit in trees. The original of the Frostating seal is in the Diplomatarium Norvegicum, a source collection of Norwegian letters and documents from earliest recorded history until 1570. The seal is found on a document dated 1 June 1453, in Dipl. Norv. VIII no. 349. A variation of this seal has lived on the coat of arms of Frosta.

== See also ==
- Medieval Scandinavian law

== Related reading ==
- Munch, Peter Andreas (1846). Norges gamle Love indtil 1387 (in Norwegian). Christiania: Chr. Gröndahl.
