= Borgarting =

Regional legislative assembly of medieval Norway

The Borgarting (Old Norse: Borgarþing) was one of the four regional legislative assemblies or lawthings (lagting) of medieval Norway. Historically, it was the site of the court and assembly for the south-eastern coastal region of Norway, covering from Göta älv (now in Sweden) in the east to the today's Risør in Agder county in the west.

The thing is named after its seat, the town of Borg (today Sarpsborg). It was established before 1164, when it absorbed the traditional districts of Grenland and Telemark. The lagting covered mostly the same areas as the current appellate court, with the addition of areas in today's Telemark, Agder, and Sweden.

When Norway was united as a kingdom, the four independent lagting – Frostating, Gulating, Eidsivating, and Borgarting – were the most supreme bodies of law, acting as both legislative assemblies and courts. In 1274, with the consent of all lagting, King Magnus the Lawmender (1238–1280) promulgated a new national law (landslov), a unified code of laws for the Kingdom of Norway, which was exceptional of its time. With this, the Borgarting law was replaced by the new law, significantly reducing the legislative power of the assembly, and centralising power in the realm.

== See also ==
- Medieval Scandinavian law

== Other sources ==
- Andersen, Per Sveaas (1977) Samlingen av Norge og kristningen av landet : 800–1130 (Oslo: Universitetsforlaget) ISBN 8200024121
- Larson, Laurence Marcellus (2011) The Earliest Norwegian Laws (The Lawbook Exchange, Ltd) ISBN 9781584779254

== Related Reading ==
- Munch P.A. (1846) Norges gamle Love indtil 1387 (Christiania: Chr. Gröndahl)
