= Bjarkey laws =

Set of laws and privileges of medieval Scandinavian merchant towns

The Bjarkey laws (Old Swedish: biærköa rætter, Old Icelandic: bjarkeyjar-rettr, Norwegian: bjarkøretten, Danish: bjærkeret, birkeret) were the laws and privileges of medieval Scandinavian merchant towns (birks).

In Norway, the Bjarkey laws concerned all the merchant towns and also every location with trade, such as fishing villages and market locations. There are two versions, an early and a late Bjarkey law, of which the early one only remains as fragments and concerned the merchant town of Nidaros. The later Bjarkey law was created primarily for the merchant town of Bergen and only the most necessary amendments were made for other merchant towns. The extant manuscripts are very much in agreement, even when they explicitly concern different merchant towns. The late law was accepted at a ting in Bergen in 1276, and is divided into nine sections of which the last one, the Farmannalög is a kind of sea law. This was the first of the revised City Laws of Magnus VI of Norway (1238-1280), known as Magnus Lagabøtes bylov, and integrated into the national Magnus Lagabøtes landslov.

In Sweden, it is the oldest law put to paper for a town, and was probably written in the late 13th century or the early 14th century, influenced by the revision of the Uppland Law. The oldest manuscript for the law is from c. 1345. The law was created for the young town Stockholm and its customs, but it was also used in Lödöse and probably in a few other towns, as well. No town was allowed to use the law without the formal permission by the Swedish king. Its use may have become more widespread if it had not been superseded by the new town law by king Magnus Eriksson (1316–1377). The term Bjarkey Laws was however used for a long time for Magnus Eriksson's law in various locations.

Some Swedish scholars have suggested that the laws are considerably older than the 13th century in Sweden. Hadorph proposed that it was created as early as 832 by king Björn at Hauge for the merchant town of Birka.

== See also ==
- Primorsk, Leningrad Oblast

== Sources ==
- The article Bjärköa-rätten in Nordisk familjebok
