= Jan Ragnar Hagland =

Norwegian professor and philogist

Jan Ragnar Hagland (born 3 March 1943 in Haugesund) is a Norwegian philologist; a professor of Old Norse at NTNU. He has worked at NTNU since 1972, and became professor in 1986.

Hagland has translated several sagas of Icelanders to Nynorsk (including Landnámabók, Njáls saga, Gísla saga), translated the Frostathing Law to modern Norwegian, and was joint author of Handbok i norrøn filologi (2004) and Trøndersk språkhistorie (2008), amongst others.

He is a fellow of the Norwegian Academy of Science and Letters. In 2017, he was named a member of the Order of the Falcon as part of the state visit of the President of Iceland to Norway.
