= Magnus Lagabøtes bylov =

13th-century Norwegian law

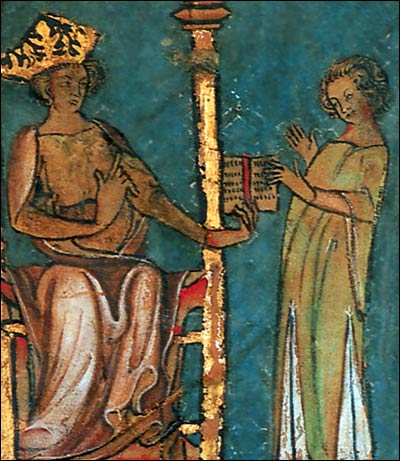
Detail of an illumination from the fourteenth-century legal manuscript Codex Hardenbergianus, showing King Magnus Lagabøte promulgating his Landsloven.

Magnus Lagabøtes bylov ('Magnus Lagabøte's City Law') was promulgated for Bergen in 1276 during the reign of King Magnus VI of Norway (known as Magnus lagabøte or 'law-mender'). Oslo, Trondheim and Tønsberg received their own versions of the City Law about the same time, with the exact year when they were adopted unknown. The City Law was based on the State Law of Magnus Lagabøte, adopted in 1274, and the Bjarkøyretten, Trondheim's old city law, which came into force during the 1100s. Audun Hugleiksson was instrumental in the design of the law.

Magnus Lagabøte's City Law had specific rules and regulations that applied to the merchants in conjunction with the State Law. The laws that applied to the countryside were omitted. The State and City Laws were undoubtedly better known and more widespread than all other secular works in Norway in the late Middle Ages.

The laws were applied verbally, with the principle of equality before the law and justice. Today, the Byloven survives in twenty-five manuscripts, mostly as a complementary addition to the State Law.

According to the City Law, the city was governed by the bymøtet or bytinget ('city meeting'), where all the town's householders met three times a year. In addition, there should be a council, usually of twelve men. The council was led by a taxpayer, later called byfogd ('city bailiff').

== See also ==
- Medieval Scandinavian law

== Sources ==
=== Works cited ===
- Bugge, Ivar (1986). Kommunal forfatning : En historisk gjennomgang av utviklingen med hovedvekt på tidsrommet fra 1837, og en beskrivelse av kommunalrett og kommunal forfatning i dagens Norge (in Norwegian). Oslo: Kommunalforlaget.
