= Björköby, Vetlanda =

Björköby
- Location within Jönköping Location within Sweden
- Coordinates: 57°31′N 14°54′E
- Country: Sweden
- Province: Småland
- County: Jönköping County
- Municipality: Vetlanda Municipality

Area
  - Total: 0.67 km^{2} (0.26 sq mi)

Population (31 December 2010)
  - Total: 273
  - Density: 405/km^{2} (1,050/sq mi)
- Time zone: UTC+1 (CET)
  - Summer (DST): UTC+2 (CEST)
- Climate: Dfb

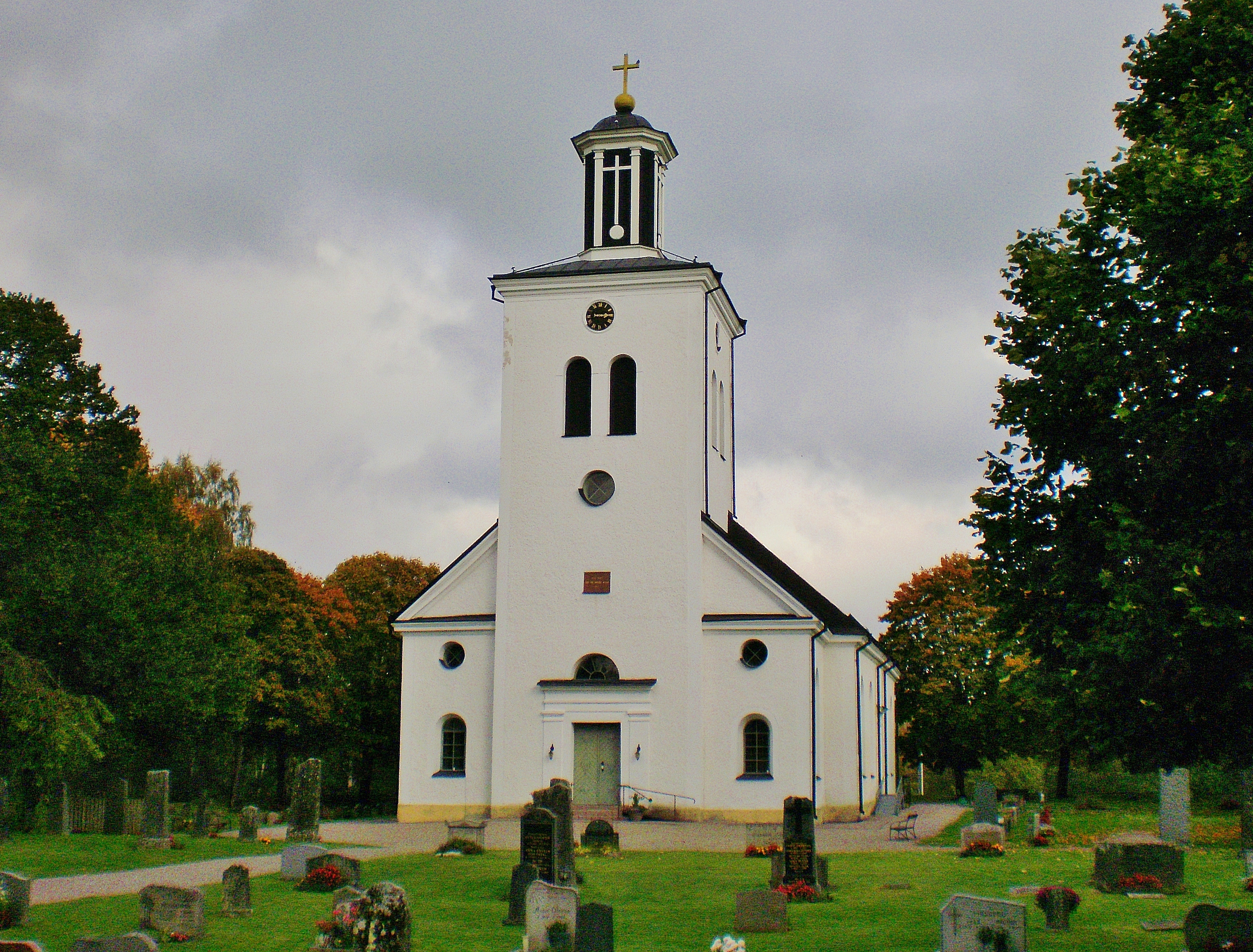
Björkö Church, Småland.

Björköby is a locality situated in Vetlanda Municipality, Jönköping County, Sweden with 273 inhabitants in 2010.
