= Eidsivating =

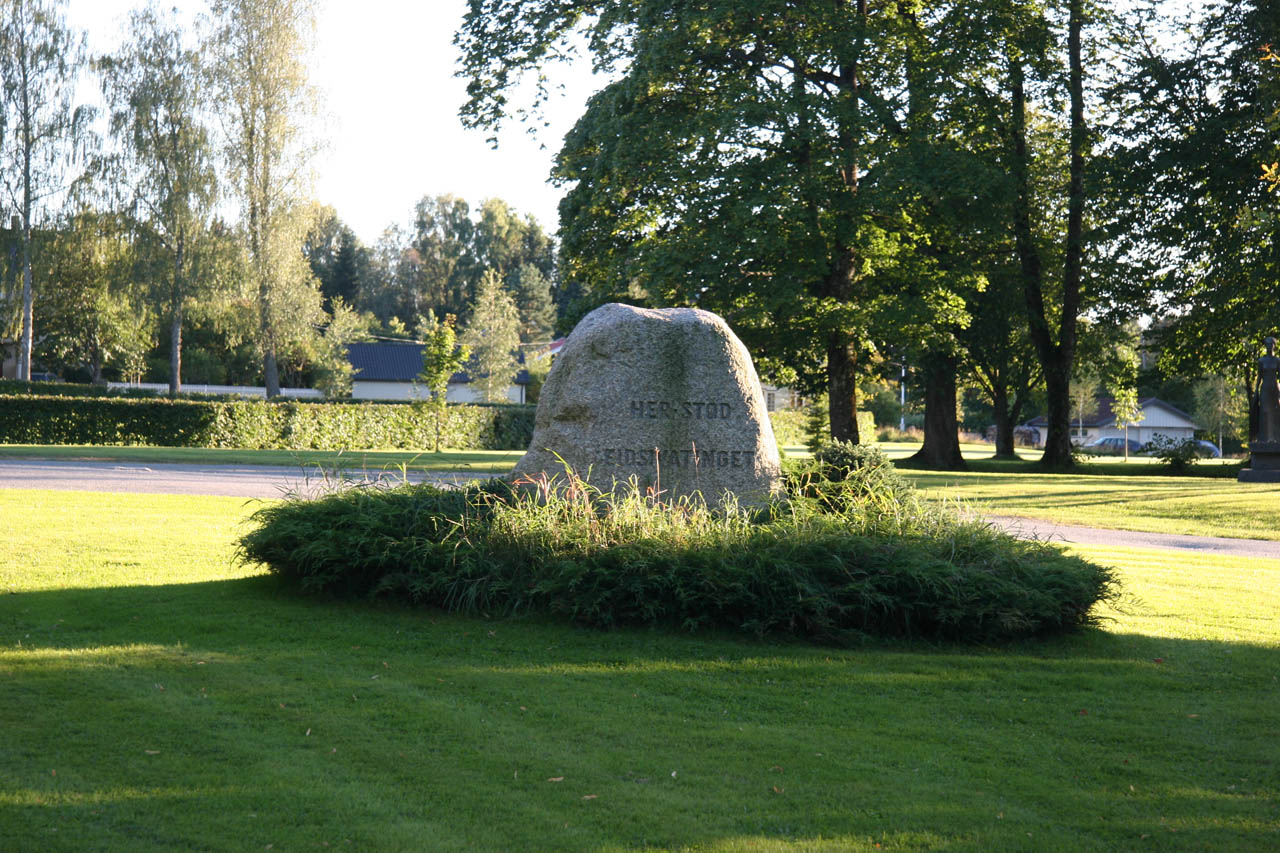
Memorial stone marking the site of the historic Eidsivating at Eidsvoll

Eidsivating (Old Norse: Heiðsævisþing) was one of the four regional legislative assemblies or things (lagting) of medieval Norway. Historically, it was the site of court and assembly for the eastern parts of Norway, and was located at Eidsvoll.

== History ==
Traditionally, Eidsivating was the court for the population around Lake Mjøsa. Eidsivating was originally situated at Åker gård, the seat of the prestegjeld of Vang in Hedmark county, Norway.

When Norway was united as a kingdom, the four independent lagting – Frostating, Gulating, Borgarting, and Eidsivating – were the most supreme bodies of law, acting as both legislative assemblies and courts. These were representative assemblies at which delegates from the various districts in each region met to award legal judgments and pass laws (Eidsivatingsloven). Later, during the time of Olaf the Holy, the court was moved to Eidsvoll. The jurisdiction of the court was then extended to include Romerike and Hadeland as well as Hedmark. Later Østerdalen and Gudbrandsdalen were also included.

In 1274, with the consent of all lagting, King Magnus the Lawmender (1238–1280) promulgated a new national law (landslov), a unified code of laws for the Kingdom of Norway, which was exceptional of its time. With this, the Eidsvating law was replaced by the new law, significantly reducing the legislative power of the assembly, and centralising power in the realm.

== See also ==
- Medieval Scandinavian law

== Other sources ==
- Andersen, Per Sveaas (1977). Samlingen av Norge og kristningen av landet : 800–1130 (in Norwegian). Oslo: Universitetsforlaget. ISBN 8200024121.
- Larson, Laurence Marcellus (2011). The Earliest Norwegian Laws (in Norwegian). The Lawbook Exchange, Ltd. ISBN 9781584779254.
