= Treaty of Perth =

1266 treaty between Norway and Scotland

- Type: Peace treaty
- Signed: 2 July 1266
- Location: Perth, Scotland
- Parties: Kingdom of Norway; Kingdom of Scotland
- Language: Latin

The Treaty of Perth, signed 2 July 1266, ended military conflict between Magnus the Lawmender of Norway and Alexander III of Scotland over possession of the Hebrides and the Isle of Man.

The Hebrides and the Isle of Man had become Norwegian territory during centuries when both Scotland and Norway were still forming themselves as coherent nation-states, and Norwegian control had been formalised in 1098, when Edgar of Scotland signed the islands over to Magnus III of Norway. In Norwegian terms, the islands were the Sudreys, meaning Southern Isles.

The treaty was agreed three years after the Battle of Largs in 1263. Michael Lynch has compared the treaty's importance with that of the Treaty of York of 1237. The Treaty of York defined a border between Scotland and England that is almost identical to the modern border.

Largs is often claimed as a great Scottish victory, but the Norwegians claimed their forces, led by King Haakon IV, were not fully committed to battle and the result was inconclusive. Håkon had planned to renew military action the following summer, but he died in Orkney during the winter. His successor, King Magnus the Lawmender, sued for peace and the Treaty was agreed after negotiations in Perth during 1265 and 1266.

In the treaty, Scotland confirmed Norwegian sovereignty over Shetland and Orkney and Norway recognised Scottish sovereignty over the disputed territories in return for a lump sum of 4,000 marks and an annuity of 100 marks. The annuity was paid during subsequent decades, until its cancellation as part of the agreement for the marriage of James III of Scotland and Margaret of Denmark, Queen of Scotland in 1469.

== See also ==
- List of treaties
