= Lars Ivar Hansen =

Norwegian historian (1947–2026)

Lars Ivar Hansen (21 November 1947 – 4 September 2026) was a Norwegian historian.

== Life and career ==
Hansen was employed at the University of Tromsø in 1976 and took the dr.philos. degree, specialising in Sami history. He became professor in 1991. Hansen was a member of the Norwegian Academy of Science and Letters. He died on 4 September 2026, at the age of 78.
