= Gulating =

Historical assembly in Norway

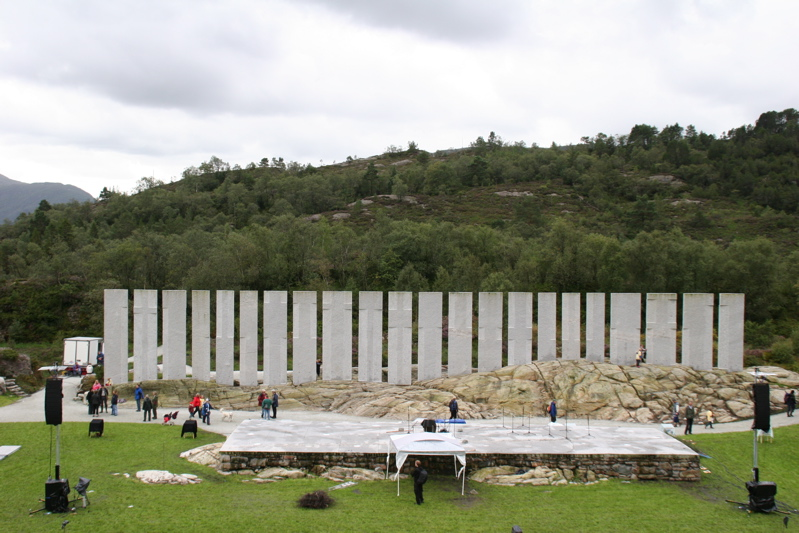
Tusenårsstaden Gulatinget: millenium monument by Bård Breivik erected August 2005 in commemoration of 1,000 years of the Gulating at Flolid in Gulen Municipality

Gulating (Old Norse: Gulaþing) was one of the four ancient popular assemblies or things (Norwegian: lagting) of medieval Norway. Historically, it was the site of court and assembly for most of Western Norway and the assembly took place in what is now Gulen Municipality in Vestland county. It functioned as a judicial and legislative body, resolving disputes and establishing laws.

Gulating, along with Norway's three other ancient regional assemblies, the Borgarting, Eidsivating, and Frostating, were joined into a single jurisdiction during the late 13th century, when King Magnus the Lawmender had the existing body of law put into writing.

== History ==
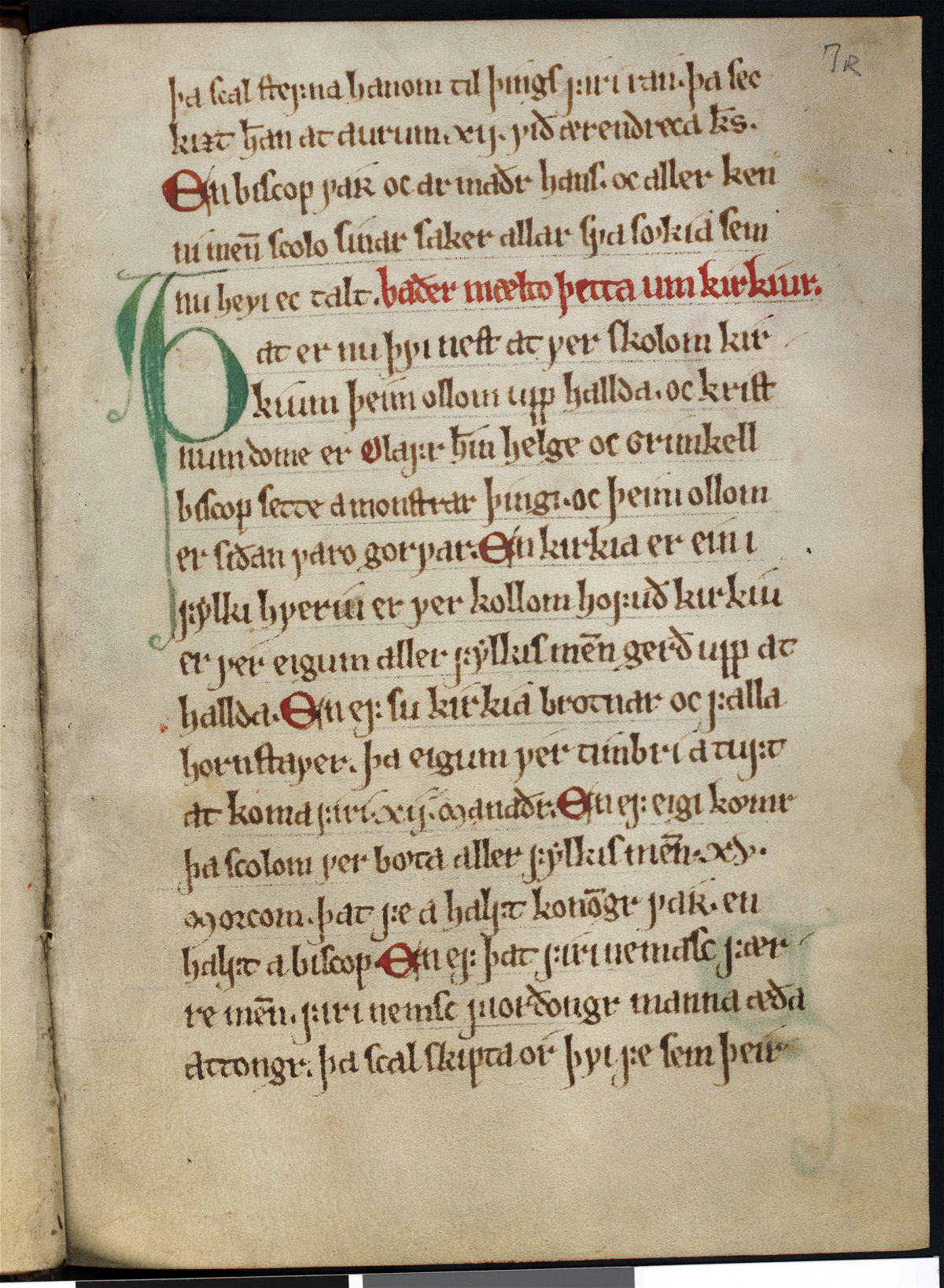
A page of the Older Gulaþing Law from Codex Rantzovianus.

The Gulating was an annual parliamentary assembly which took place in Gulen, on the west coast of Norway north of Bergen, from approximately AD 900 to 1300 and was one of the oldest and largest parliamentary assemblies in medieval Norway. The assembly site was established early in the 10th century and the original legislative area covered all of the present-day Vestland county. The Gulatinget millennium site is a symbol of the history of this Norwegian representative form of parliament, with traditions reaching over a thousand years back in time.

The practice of periodic regional assemblies of leading men predates recorded history, and was firmly established at the time of the unification of Norway into a single kingdom (900–1030). When Norway was united as a kingdom, the four independent lagting – Frostating, Gulating, Eidsivating, and Borgarting – were the most supreme bodies of law, acting as both legislative assemblies and courts. They provided the institutional and legal framework for subsequent legislative and judicial bodies, and remain in operation today as superior regional courts.

Initially the Gulating was an 'allting' or common assembly, where all free farmers had the right to participate. Snorri Sturlason’s Heimskringla recounts that Haakon the Good (935–961) took an active part in the assemblies at Gulen, and under his rule the regions of Rogaland, Agder and Sunnmøre were brought into the area covered by the thing, with Valdres and Hallingdal also being incorporated later. Special legislation, Gulatingslova (the Gulating law), was drafted to aid the discussions.

While the Gulating was not a democratic assembly in the modern sense of an elected body, it effectively represented the interests of a large number of people rather than a small elite. The laws were typically crafted as social contracts. §35 for instance states, "None of us shall take goods from others, or take the law into our own hands". The laws also applied for every person inside the Gulaþingslǫg, which was the jurisdiction of the assembly. The assembly served as the model for the establishment of the legislative assemblies of Iceland (the Althing) and of the Faroe Islands (the Løgting), areas settled by people from western Norway.

== The Gulating Law ==
The Older Gulating Law is the oldest record of Norwegian law and was possibly first created during the reign of Olaf the Peaceful (1066–1093). The laws were amended and expanded over time, and it is likely that some parts of it would have existed in heathen oral tradition at least as far back as the 10th century. The law remained in force until it was replaced by the Younger Gulating Law in 1267 which in turn lasted until 1274 when Magnus the Lawmender imposed his "Law of the Realm", which incorporated 130 chapters from the Gulating Law.

The Older Gulating Law is preserved in seventeen manuscripts with the most complete being DonVar 137 4to, also known as Codex Rantzovianus, which dates to around 1260 and is kept at the Danish Royal Library. The law covers a diverse range of topics such as enforcing correct Christian practice (including the banning of blót and other aspects of Old Nordic religion), whaling rights, weregild and inheritance.

== Judgments ==
Violence was dealt with by fines, which were imposed not only on the murderer, but also on his relatives—a practice that distinguishes Old Norse law from the Roman practice of holding only the individual responsible. Homicide of an heir to a property, according to Gulaþing law §218-228, is punished by a collective fee of 189 cattle, where each responsible party's share is spelled out in detail.

== See also ==
- Medieval Scandinavian law
