= Magnus the Lawmender =

King of Norway from 1263 to 1280

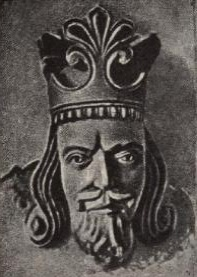
- Contemporary bust of Magnus from the Stavanger Cathedral, dated c. 1270s–80s.

King of Norway
- Reign: 16 December 1263 – 9 May 1280
- Coronation: 14 September 1261, Bergen
- Predecessor: Haakon IV
- Successor: Eric II
- Born: 1 or 3 May 1238; Tønsberg, Norway
- Died: 9 May 1280 (aged 42); Bergen, Norway
- Burial: Bergen Cathedral
- Spouse: Ingeborg of Denmark (m. 1261)
- Issue: Eric II; Haakon V
Names
- Magnús Hákonarson
- House: Sverre
- Father: Haakon IV of Norway
- Mother: Margrete Skulesdatter

Magnus the Lawmender (Note: Old Norse: Magnús lagabœtir, Modern Norwegian: Magnus Lagabøte) (1 or 3 May 1238 – 9 May 1280), also known as Magnus Haakonsson, (Note: Old Norse: Magnús Hákonarson, Modern Norwegian: Magnus Håkonsson) was King of Norway from 1263 to 1280. One of his greatest achievements was the modernisation and nationalisation of the Norwegian law-code. He was the first Norwegian monarch known to have used an ordinal number, counting himself as Magnus IV.

== Early life ==
Magnus Håkonsson was the youngest son of King Håkon Håkonsson and his wife Margaret Skulesdatter. He was born in Tunsberg and was baptised in May 1238. He spent most of his upbringing in Bergen. In 1257 his older brother Håkon died, leaving Magnus the heir-apparent to the kingdom. His father gave him the title of king the same year. On 11 September 1261, he married Ingeborg, the daughter of King Eric IV of Denmark, after she was practically abducted by King Håkon's men from the monastery she was living in. The struggle to claim Ingeborg's inheritance from her murdered father later involved Norway in intermittent conflicts with Denmark for decades to come. Magnus and Ingeborg were crowned directly after their marriage, and Magnus was given Ryfylke for his personal upkeep. On 16 December 1263 King Håkon died during a campaign against the Scottish king over the Hebrides, and Magnus became the ruler of Norway.

== Reign ==
=== Foreign policy ===
Magnus' rule brought about a change from the somewhat aggressive foreign policy of his father. In 1266 he gave up the Hebrides and the Isle of Man to Scotland, in return for a large sum of silver and a yearly payment, under the Treaty of Perth, by which the Scots at the same time recognised Norwegian rule over Shetland and the Orkney Islands. In 1269 the Treaty of Winchester cemented good relations with the English king Henry III. Magnus also seems to have had good relations with the Swedish King Valdemar Birgersson, and in the 1260s, the border with Sweden was officially defined for the first time. When Valdemar was deposed by his two brothers and fled to Norway in 1275, this stirred Magnus into gathering a leidang-fleet for the first and only time in his reign. With a large fleet, he met with the new Swedish King Magnus Ladulås to try to bring about a settlement between the two brothers, but without success, Magnus of Sweden would not give in to pressure and Magnus of Norway retreated without engaging in hostile actions.

=== Internal policies ===
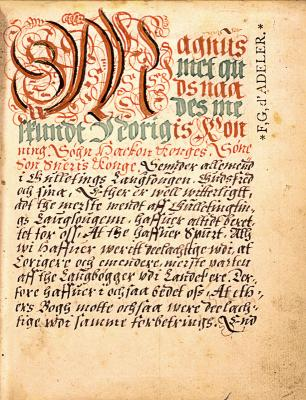
Page from the national law (Landslov) of Magnus.

In internal politics, Magnus carried out a great effort to modernise the law-code, which gave him his epithet law-mender. Magnus had several legal scholars and advisors to assist on this work, presumably Audun Hugleiksson, Askatin, Tore Haakonson, and Sturla Tordsson. The modernised law-codes were adopted at the Things in the years 1274 (Landslov) and 1276 (Byloven). In 1274 he promulgated the new national law, known as Magnus Lagabøtes landslov, a unified code of laws to apply for the whole country, including the Faroe Islands and Shetland. This replaced the different regional laws which had existed before. It was supplemented by a new municipal law (a law for the cities) in 1276, Magnus Lagabøtes bylov, and a slightly modified version was also drawn up for Iceland. A unified code of laws for a whole country was at this time something quite new, which had until then only been introduced in Sicily and Castile. His code introduced the concept that crime is an offense against the state rather than against the individual and thus narrowed the possibilities of personal vengeance. It increased the formal power of the king, making the throne the source of justice. The municipal law gave the cities increased freedom from rural control. A specific section fixed the law of succession to the throne, in accordance with the arrangements laid down by King Håkon Håkonsson in 1260.

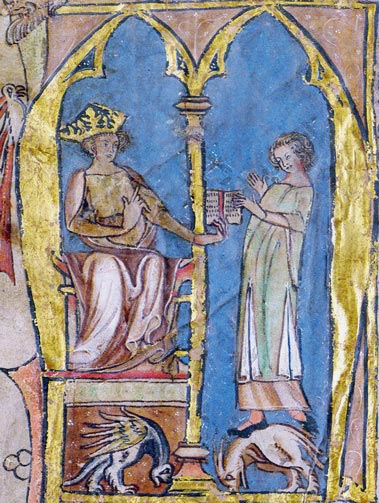
Magnus giving his national law to a lawman, illumination from the 14th century Codex Hardenbergianus.

The royal succession was an important and prickly matter, the last of the civil wars, fought for decades over disputed successions to the throne, having finally ended only in 1240. In 1273 Magnus gave his eldest son, five-year-old Eric, the title of king, and his younger brother Håkon the title of duke, thus making it unequivocally clear who would be his heir.

Although Magnus was by all accounts a personally very pious king, his work with the law-codes brought him into conflict with the archbishop, who resisted temporal authority over the church, and sought to preserve the church's influence over the kingdom. The Tønsberg Concord (Sættargjerden in Tønsberg) signed in 1277 between King Magnus and Jon Raude, Archbishop of Nidaros, confirmed certain privileges of the clergy, the freedom of episcopal elections and similar matters. The church preserved considerable independence in judicial matters, but gave up its old claim that the Norwegian kingdom was a fief under the ultimate authority of the Catholic Church.

In cultural terms Magnus continued his father's policy of introducing European courtly culture to Norway. In 1277 he replaced the old Norse titles lendmann and skutilsvein with the European titles baron and ridder (knight), at the same time giving them certain extra privileges and the right to be addressed as lord (herre). Magnus is probably also the first Norwegian king to have named himself using an ordinal number - he called himself "Magnus IV" (he did not count Magnus Haraldsson (II) and Magnus Sigurdsson (IV)). Immediately after his father's death, he commissioned the Icelander Sturla Þórðarson to write his father's saga, or biography. In 1278, he commissioned the same man to write his own saga. The Saga of Magnus the lawmender (Magnúss saga lagabœtis) thus became the last of the medieval Norwegian kings' sagas; unfortunately, only a short fragment of it has been preserved.

== Death and aftermath ==
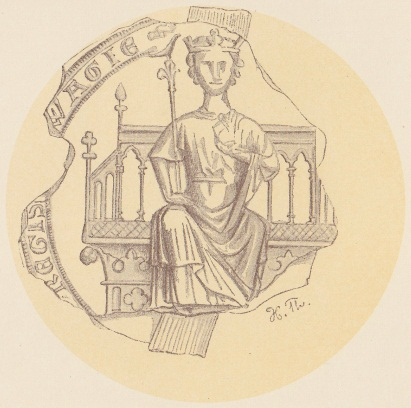
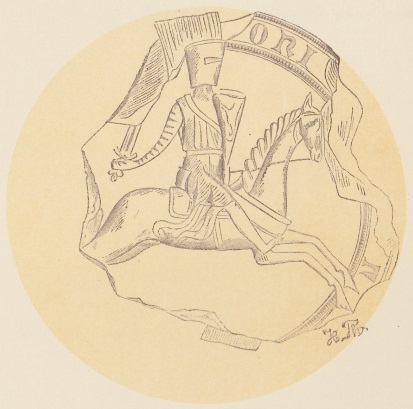
Seal of Magnus, obverse (left) and reverse (right).

In the spring of 1280, Magnus fell ill in Bergen. He planned to have his son Eric crowned at midsummer as co-ruler, but died on 9 May. Eric succeeded him at the age of 12. Real power fell to a circle of advisors, prominent among them Magnus' widow, Ingeborg. Magnus was remembered as a good ruler, who ruled by law rather than by the sword.

The nationalist-conservative historian Oscar Albert Johnsen, who headed the Institute of Medieval Texts, founded during the occupation of Norway by the Nazis, considered Magnus a weak king for giving up the Hebrides and acquiescing to the demands of the Church. Mostly considered a rather wise king, sparing the kingdom of unnecessary and unfruitful wars, while preserving stability at home and finally bringing the Icelandic Commonwealth under Norwegian control.

Magnus was buried in the church of the Franciscan monastery in Bergen, which has since the 16th century been the Bergen Cathedral (Bergen Domkirke).

== Other sources ==
- Sturla Þórðarson (1964) [1894]. The Saga of Hakon and a Fragment of the Saga of Magnus with Appendices. Vol. 88.4. Translated by G.W. Dasent. London: Rerum Britannicarum Medii Ævi Scriptores.
- Knut Helle (1974). Norge blir en stat, 1130–1319. Universitetsforlaget. pp. 134–146.

Magnus the Lawmender House of Sverre Cadet branch of the Fairhair dynasty Born: 1 May 1238 Died: 9 May 1280
Regnal titles
Preceded by Haakon IV as sole king	King of Norway; 1257–1280 with Haakon IV (1257–1263); Eric II (1273–1280)	Succeeded by Eric II as sole king
