= Haakon the Crazy =

Norwegian earl (1173–1214)

Haakon the Crazy (Old Norse: Hákon galinn, Norwegian: Håkon Galen) was a Norwegian jarl and Birkebeiner chieftain during the civil war era in Norway. Håkon Galen was born no later than the 1170s and died in 1214. His epithet "the crazy" or "the mad" can also be translated as frenzied, furious or frantic and probably refers to ferociousness in battle.

== Background ==
Håkon Galen was the son of Folkvid the Lawspeaker and Cecilia Sigurdsdotter, an illegitimate daughter of king Sigurd Munn. Cecilia had been married off to Folkvid the Lawspeaker in Värmland in Sweden, by her father's enemies after he had been defeated and killed in 1155. In 1177, Sverre arrived in Norway and took over leadership of the Birkebeiner rebel faction. Sverre claimed to be an illegitimate son of king Sigurd Munn, and thus Cecilia's half-brother. Subsequently Cecilia left her husband and returned to Norway, probably taking young Håkon with her. After Sverre succeeded in winning the throne of Norway, Cecilia had her marriage to Folkvid annulled, claiming she had been forced to marry him against her will.

== Career ==
Håkon Galen is first mentioned in the Sagas as one of the prominent men among the Birkebeiner fighting for King Sverre in 1193 against a force led by Harald Maddadsson, the Earl of Orkney. He was supported by two sons-in-law of Erling Skakke, Hallkjell Jonsson and Sigurd Magnusson, the latter an acknowledged son of King Magnus V of Norway and claimant to the throne of Norway. The attacking force was gathered from the islands of Orkney and Shetland, giving rise to the name Island Beards (Eyjarskeggjar).

In the spring of 1194, King Sverre sailed south to confront the attacking force. The two fleets met on April 3 in the Battle of Florvåg (Slaget ved Florvåg) on Askøy, an island just north of Bergen. Both Hallkjell Jonsson and Sigurd Magnusson died in the conflict. The battle experience of the Birkebeiner veterans proved to be decisive in achieving victory over the Eyjarskeggjar.

In January 1204, when King Sverre's son, King Håkon III died, Håkon Galen was made leader of the army, given the title jarl (earl) and named steward of the kingdom during the minority of the child Guttorm Sigurdsson. These appointments were made the day after Guttorm became king and Håkon thus became the real leader of the Birkebeiner, as King Guttorm was only 4 years old. When Guttorm suddenly died in August the same year, Håkon was the favored candidate among the Birkebeiner military leaders, the lendmenn, to become the next king. However, at the Thing convened in Nidaros to elect the new king, his candidacy was opposed by the Archdiocese of Nidaros and the farmers of Trøndelag. According to the Bagler sagas, Håkon's Swedish origins were held against him. In the end, Håkon's half-brother, Inge Bårdsson became king. Håkon remained earl and leader of the military, and was given half the royal revenues.

From 1204 until 1208, Inge and Håkon fought the Bagler rising, under the pretenders Erling Steinvegg and Philippus Simonsson, until the warfare was ended by the settlement of Kvitsøy. By this agreement, Inge and Håkon recognized Bagler rule over the eastern parts of Norway with Philippus ruling as earl, under the nominal overlordship of king Inge, while the Birkebeiner remained in control of the rest of the country. Earl Håkon ruled the western part of Norway, with his power base in Bergen.

The relationship between Håkon and his brother Inge seems to have been tense at times. When it became clear that Philippus was continuing to call himself king, in breach of the Kvitsøy-agreement, Håkon made attempts to have himself declared king as well, but Inge refused to accept this. Instead, an agreement was drawn up by which the brother that survived the other would inherit the other’s lands, while a legitimate son of either would inherit them both. Håkon's legitimate son, Knut Haakonsson, thereby seemed to be in a strong position to become the next king, as Inge only had an illegitimate son. In 1214, earl Håkon was suspected of having had a hand in a rising by the farmers of Trøndelag against king Inge. Open conflict between the two brothers never broke out, however, as Håkon died of natural causes in Bergen just after Christmas of 1214. Inge took over his part of the kingdom.

== Personal life ==
In 1205, Håkon Galen married the Swedish noblewoman Kristina Nilsdotter, whose maternal grandfather was Eric the Saint who reigned as King Eric IX of Sweden. They had a son Knut Håkonsson (c. 1208 - 1261). After the death of Håkon, Kristina took their son Knut with her and returned to Västergötland, Sweden where she married Swedish nobleman, Eskil Magnusson. Håkon Galen was buried in the old Bergen Cathedral which was demolished in 1531. Today, a memorial marks its site in Bergenhus fortress.

== Primary sources ==
The main source of information concerning the life of Håkon Galen is from the Bagler sagas (Baglersagaene). He is also mentioned in Sverris saga and Håkon Håkonsson's saga.

== Historic prospective ==
The Norwegian civil war era (Norwegian: Borgerkrigstida) was the period between 1130 and 1240. During this time, a series of civil wars were fought between rival kings and pretenders to the throne of Norway. After the death of King Sigurd the Crusader in 1130, the goal of the warring parties was always to put their man on the throne. In the first decades of the civil wars, alliances frequently shifted, and centered on the person of a king or pretender to the throne, but eventually, towards the end of the 12th century, two rival parties emerged, known as the Birkebeiner and the Bagler. After these two factions were reconciled in 1217, a more ordered system of centralized government was gradually able to bring an end to such frequent uprisings. The failed rebellion of duke Skule Bårdsson in 1240 was the final episode of the civil war era.

== Sources ==
- Jónsson, Karl The Saga of King Sverri of Norway translator J. Stephton. (Llanerch Press) ISBN 1-897853-49-1
- Koht, Havfdan The Scandinavian Kingdoms until the end of the thirteenth century ( Cambridge: Cambridge University Press. 1929)
- Þórðarson, Sturla The Saga of Hakon and a Fragment of the Saga of Magnus with Appendices translation to English by G.W. Dasent (London: Rerum Britannicarum Medii Ævi Scriptores, vol.88.4, 1894, repr. 1964)
