= Bård Guttormsson =

- Born: c. 1150
- Died: 3 April 1194; Bergen, Norway
- Noble family: Godwin
- Spouses: Ulvhild Pålsdatter; Cecilia Sigurdsdotter; Ragnfrid Erlingsdatter
- Issue: Inge II of Norway; Skule Bårdsson
- Father: Guttorm of Rein
- Mother: Sigrid Thorkelsdotter

Bård Guttormsson (c. 1150 – 3 April 1194) was a Norwegian Birkebeiner and a lieutenant of Sverre of Norway. Patrilineally, he was also a member of the House of Godwin.

In the Bagler sagas, Bård is described as very rich, witty, and quiet-natured. Bård was among the third generation of a wealthy family lieutenants based near Rein Church near Rissa, whose family had historically supported the kings of the House of Gille such as Sigurd II and Haakon Herdebrei.

== Background ==
As a lieutenant, Bård participated in a great battle between kings Sverre and Magnus V in the Battle of Nordnes on 31 May 1181. Sverre's saga depicts Bård as having been slow, not very aggressive, and quick to flee. As a result of this, Bård was mocked by his own brothers-in-arms and was refused a horse on the ride to Nidaros.

By the spring of 1183, he and Ivar Silke led an expedition to northern Norway against the viking Erling Vidkunnsson in Bjarkøy. By 1184, he was also part of a punitive expedition that burned down Lusakaupang in Sogn. It is possible that he participated in the decisive battle between Magnus and Sverre at Fimreite in June 1184. However, the last time Bård is mentioned in military context is in the Battle of Florvåg in the spring of 1194. Here, he was badly wounded and died shortly afterwards in Bergen.

== Marriages and family ==
Bård married three times:

1. Ulvhild Pålsdatter
2. Cecilia Sigurdsdotter (1155–1186), the illegitimate daughter of Sigurd II
3. Ragnfrid Erlingsdatter

Following Ulvhild's death, Bård was left a widower. Being one of the most prominent men within Norway at the time, it was thus imperative for Sverre to gain his support during the civil war. Around 1184, therefore, following the victory over Magnus Erlingsson, Sverre intended to marry Sigurd II's daughter Cecilia to Bård, even though Cecilia was already married to Folkvid the Lawspeaker who was still alive at the time. The proposed marriage between Cecilia and Bård was thus protested by Archbishop Øystein, who himself had applied a law revoking the previous right to divorce. However, the marriage was ultimately still able to go ahead once Cecilia testified she had been married to Folkvid against her will, as a prerequisite to a legal marriage was that both parties had married according to their own will.

With Cecilia, he had a son, Inge, who was later crowned King of Norway during the civil war era. Bård had another son with Ragnfrid: Skule Bårdsson, a duke and a rival of King Haakon IV. Skule's daughter Margaret later married Haakon, becoming the queen of Norway. Despite the approval of Bård's marriage to Cecilia, there were still claims that their marriage was invalid and that Inge was technically illegitimate.
