= Guttorm of Norway =

King of Norway in 1204

Guttorm Sigurdsson

King of Norway
- Reign: 2 January – 11 August 1204
- Predecessor: Haakon III
- Successor: Inge II
- Regent: Haakon the Crazy
- Born: 1199
- Died: 11 August 1204 (aged 4–5)
- Burial: Nidaros Cathedral
- House: House of Sverre
- Father: Sigurd Lavard

Guttorm Sigurdsson (Old Norse: Guttormr Sigurðarson; 1199 – 11 August 1204) was the king of Norway from January to August 1204, during the Norwegian civil war era. As a grandson of King Sverre, he was proclaimed king by the Birkebeiner faction when he was just four years old. Although obviously not in control of the events surrounding him, Guttorm's accession to the throne under the effective regency of Haakon the Crazy led to renewed conflict between the Birkebeiner and the Bagler factions, the latter supported militarily by Valdemar II of Denmark.

Guttorm's reign ended abruptly when the child king suddenly became ill and died. Rumours among the Birkebeiner held that Guttorm's illness and death had been caused by Haakon the Crazy's future wife Christina Nilsdatter, a claim considered dubious by modern historians. Low-intensity civil war followed Guttorm's death, until a settlement was reached in 1207, temporarily dividing the kingdom.

== Background ==
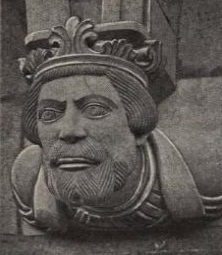
Bust of King Sverre.

Guttorm was an illegitimate son of Sigurd Lavard and thus a grandson of King Sverre. The identity of his mother is unknown. Sigurd predeceased his father, Sverre, who died in 1202 and was succeeded by his younger son Haakon Sverresson. Haakon reigned until his own death on 1 January 1204. Haakon had pursued a policy of peace and reunification between the Birkebeiner and Bagler during his short reign, but following his death relations between the parties collapsed and a new phase of the Norwegian civil wars began. Parts of the Birkebeiner were disgruntled by Haakon's policy of reconciliation with the Bagler, which may have led to his death, following which the balance of power within the Birkebeiner switched immediately to the faction around Haakon the Crazy.

The day after Haakon's death, the Birkebeiner designated Guttorm as king at a meeting of the hird, in consultation with Bishop Martin of Bergen. Sverre's nephew Haakon the Crazy was simultaneously appointed regent as leader of the hird and the army. According to the Bǫglunga sǫgur (Bagler sagas), the young king then took a sword and mounted it to Haakon's side, and handed him a shield. He further gave Haakon the title of earl, with consent from all the chieftains, and had Haakon sit next to him at his throne. Haakon's unusually strong position was thus symbolised by his sitting at the same level as the king, and not on a lower seat as would have been customary for an earl. Another of Sverre's nephews, Peter Støyper, together with Einar Kongsmåg, husband of Sverre's daughter Cecilia, were appointed as Guttorm's guardians.

== Revolt and death ==
The appointment of the warlike and power-hungry Haakon the Crazy (called "the mad dog" by the Bagler) to key positions contributed to conflicts within the Birkebeiner, and a worsening of relations with the Bagler. Haakon's elevation led the Bagler to believe that there was not much hope of peace with the Birkebeiner. The Bagler therefore travelled to Denmark and united around Erling Stonewall, an alleged son of former king Magnus Erlingsson, whom elements of the party had attempted to proclaim as king in 1203. Their revolt was actively supported by Valdemar II of Denmark, who sought to regain the ancient Danish overlordship of Viken, in Norway.

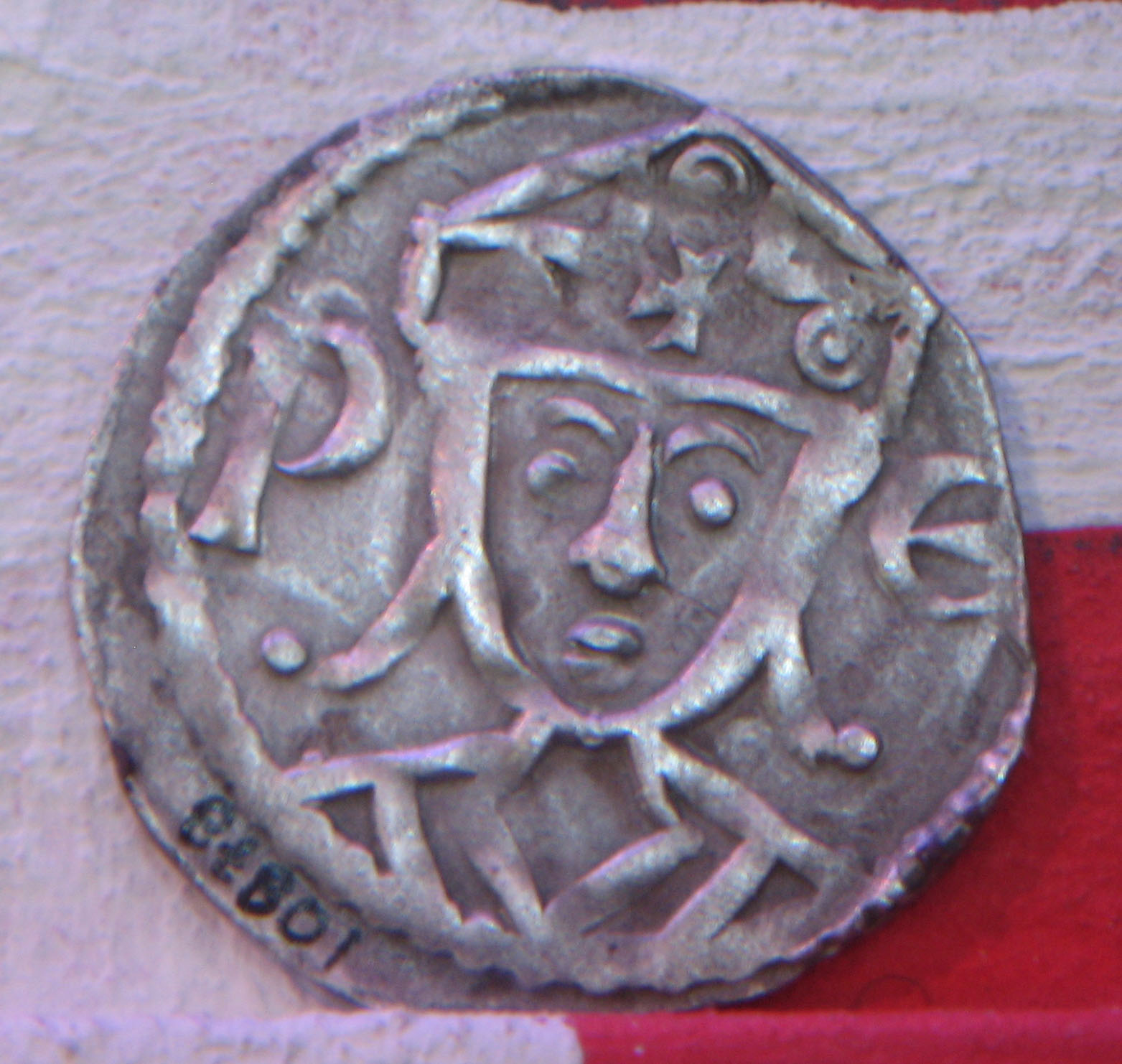
Coin of Valdemar II, who aided the Bagler.

Valdemar arrived in Viken in June with more than 300 ships, and Erling performed a trial by ordeal before the king in Tønsberg. In turn, the Danish king gave 35 ships to Erling, and together with Philip Simonsson (another Bagler rival), he swore allegiance to Valdemar. Although Philip's claim to the throne was supported by both Valdemar and the church, in the end, the Bagler proclaimed Erling as king and Philip as earl at Haugating and Borgarting (things of the southeastern parts of Norway), and the Bagler quickly gained control of Viken. Guttorm was in turn proclaimed king (konungstekja) by the Birkebeiner at Øyrating in Trondheim in the spring or early summer. While Haakon the Crazy was in the process of gathering an army to fight the Bagler, likely at a second purely military assembly at Øyrating, Guttorm suddenly became ill and died on 11 August. He was buried at the Nidaros Cathedral in Trondheim.

In the longer version of the Bǫglunga sǫgur, it is insinuated that Guttorm's illness and death were caused by Swedish-born Christina Nilsdatter, who married Haakon the Crazy shortly after Guttorm's death. Modern historians consider this claim to be dubious, derived from rumours spread by the Birkebeiner in connection with the sudden death of Haakon Sverresson some months earlier. The same source claims that Haakon was poisoned, allegedly by Sverre's widow Margaret, Christina's aunt. Haakon the Crazy's bid to succeed Guttorm as king foundered because he was not trusted and had made powerful opponents. Guttorm's death was followed by low-intensity civil war between his successor Inge Bårdsson and the Bagler, until a settlement was reached between Inge, Haakon and the new Bagler pretender Philip Simonsson in 1207, which for some years divided the kingdom.

== Bibliography ==
- Blom, Grethe Authén (1972). Samkongedømme – enekongedømme – Håkon Magnussons hertugdømme. Trondheim: Universitetsforlaget. ISBN 82-00-08853-7.
- Helle, Knut (1972). Konge og gode menn i norsk riksstyring ca. 1150–1319. Bergen: Universitetsforlaget. ISBN 82-00-08836-7.
- Helle, Knut (1974). Norge blir en stat: 1130–1319. Handbok i norsk historie. Vol. 3. Universitetsforlaget. ISBN 82-00-01323-5.
- Lunden, Kåre (1976). Norge under Sverreætten, 1177–1319. Norges historie. Vol. 3. Oslo: Cappelen. ISBN 82-02-03453-1.

Guttorm Sigurdsson House of Sverre Cadet branch of the Fairhair dynasty Born: 1199 Died: 11 August 1204
Regnal titles
Preceded by Haakon III	King of Norway; 1204	Succeeded by Inge II
