= Inge Bårdsson =

King of Norway from 1204 to 1217

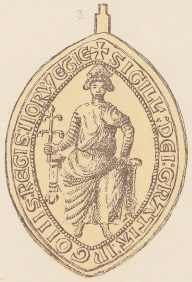
- Seal of King Inge II Bårdsson of Norway

King of Norway
- Reign: 1204 – 23 April 1217
- Predecessor: Guttorm
- Successor: Haakon IV
- Born: 1185
- Died: 23 April 1217 (aged 31–32); Nidaros
- Burial: Nidaros Cathedral
- Issue: Guttorm Ingesson
- House: Godwin (agnatic); Gille (cognatic)
- Father: Bård Guttormsson
- Mother: Cecilia Sigurdsdotter

Inge II (Norwegian: Inge Bårdsson, Old Norse: Ingi Bárðarson; 1185 – 23 April 1217) was King of Norway from 1204 to 1217. His reign was within the later stages of the period known in Norwegian history as the age of civil wars. Inge was the king of the birkebeiner faction. The conclusion of the settlement of Kvitsøy with the bagler faction in 1208 led to peace for the last nine years of Inge's reign, at the price of Inge and the birkebeiner recognising bagler rule over Viken (the Oslofjord area).

== Background ==
Inge's father, Bård, was a prominent lendmann from the Trøndelag region and a descendant of Tostig Godwinson. He was an early supporter of king Sverre, who brought the Birkebeiner faction to power in the late 12th century after years of war against king Magnus Erlingsson. Inge's mother, Cecilia, was the daughter of an earlier king, Sigurd Munn. She had been married to the lawspeaker Folkvid in Värmland Sweden. After her brother, Sverre, had won the throne of Norway, she left her husband and travelled to Sverre in Norway, claiming she had been wedded to Folkvid against her will. The archbishop annulled her marriage to Folkvid, and Sverre gave her to his trusted follower Bård Guttormsson in marriage. Inge was Bård and Cecilia's only son.

== Accession ==
After king Sverre died in 1202, his son, Haakon, and his grandson, Guttorm, died within two years. The birkebeiner were thus left without any direct successors to Sverre. (The existence of another grandson of Sverre, Haakon Haakonsson, was as yet unknown.) Sverre's old adversaries, the bagler, were exploiting the situation to launch a new invasion of Viken under their king, Erling Steinvegg. After the infant king Guttorm's death in August 1204, the birkebeiner needed a strong leader to oppose the bagler threat. The birkebeiner leaders wanted earl Haakon the Crazy, who had earlier been appointed to rule the kingdom in king Guttorm's infancy. Haakon was Inge's older half-brother, the son of Cecilia and Folkvid. However, Eirik, archbishop of Nidaros, and the farmers of Trøndelag insisted on choosing Inge, who had until then ruled Trøndelag under Guttorm. A compromise was reached, whereby Inge became king, while earl Haakon became leader of the army, and received half the royal income.

== Reign ==
The next four years saw intense fighting between the birkebeiner and the bagler. The bagler king Erling died in 1206, but the bagler continued the fight under their new king, Philip Simonsson. The bagler controlled the Viken area, with the cities of Tønsberg and Oslo King Inge controlled Trøndelag with Nidaros, while Bergen in western Norway changed hands several times. On 22 April 1206 the bagler attacked Nidaros during wedding celebrations for Inge's sister Sigrid and Inge himself only barely escaped with his life after swimming the Nidelva river in freezing temperatures. The next year, the 'birkebeiner' launched a successful attack on the 'bagler' stronghold of Tønsberg, but the war dragged on with neither side able to gain a decisive victory. In autumn of 1207, archbishop Tore of Nidaros and bishop Nikolas of Oslo, a prominent 'bagler', started negotiations for a settlement of the dispute. They succeeded in bringing about a meeting between kings Inge, Philip, and earl Haakon, at Kvitsøy in Rogaland in the autumn of 1208. A settlement was made, whereby Philip agreed to give up the title of king and his royal seal. He was to remain in control of eastern Norway with Viken, except Bohuslän, with the title of earl under king Inge. Earl Haakon was given western Norway with Bergen, while Inge would be the only king, overlord of Philip and Haakon and direct ruler of Trøndelag with Nidaros. To seal the treaty, Philip married king Sverre's daughter and king Inge's cousin, Kristina Sverresdotter.

The peace treaty held for the rest of Inge's reign. However, Philip did not respect its provisions and continued to use the title of king, maintaining his royal seal. The relationship between Inge and his brother Haakon remained tense. When it became clear that Philip was continuing to call himself king, Haakon made attempts to have himself declared king as well, but Inge refused to accept this. Instead, an agreement was drawn up by which the brother that survived the other would inherit the other's lands, while a legitimate son of either would inherit them both. Haakon had a legitimate son, while Inge only had an illegitimate son, Guttorm (b. 1206) by a concubine called Gyrid. In 1214, Inge suppressed a rising by the farmers of Trøndelag; Earl Haakon was suspected of having had a hand in the rising. Open conflict between the two brothers never broke out, however, and Haakon died of natural causes in Bergen just after Christmas of 1214. Inge took over his part of the kingdom.

In 1217, Inge fell ill in Nidaros. During his illness, he appointed his younger half-brother, Skule Bårdsson, earl and leader of the army. On 23 April 1217, Inge died. He was buried in Nidaros Cathedral. He was succeeded as king by the 13-year-old Haakon Haakonsson, an illegitimate grandson of King Sverre, who had been raised at the courts of King Inge and Earl Haakon since they became aware of his existence in 1206. Skule continued as earl and de facto ruler for the next few years.

== Appraisal of Inge ==
Many historians have seen Inge as a rather weak king. He never achieved control over all of Norway, and agreed to a power-sharing with the bagler, which he stuck to even though Philip broke the agreement by continuing to style himself as "king". As a reaction to such views, others have claimed that Inge was a strong ruler, in that he was able to withstand the pressure of the more war-like among the birkebeiner and put a halt to the destructive civil wars for a time.

The bagler sagas - a contemporary source - describes Inge as a quiet and calm man, who shied away from feasting and preferred to spend his time in his own quarters with close friends - a character trait which was held against him by some of his men. His health was weakened following his near brush with death during the attack on Nidaros in 1206.

== Sources ==
Main sources for Inge's reign are the bagler sagas, which were written during and shortly after his reign. Inge is also mentioned less extensively at the start of Håkon Håkonsson's saga. The first Norwegian royal letter to survive dates from the days of Inge's reign, however, it was written by Inge's rival Philip.

Inge Bårdsson Gille branch Cadet branch of the Fairhair dynasty Born: 1185 Died: 23 April 1217
Regnal titles
Preceded by Guttorm	King of Norway; 1204–1217	Succeeded by Haakon IV
