= House of Sverre =

Norwegian royal dynasty

House of Sverre Sverreætten
- Parent house: Gille (claimed)
- Country: Norway
- Founded: 1184
- Founder: Sverre Sigurdsson
- Final ruler: Haakon V
- Titles: Chieftain of the Birkebeiner; King of Norway
- Cadet branches: House of Rosensverd

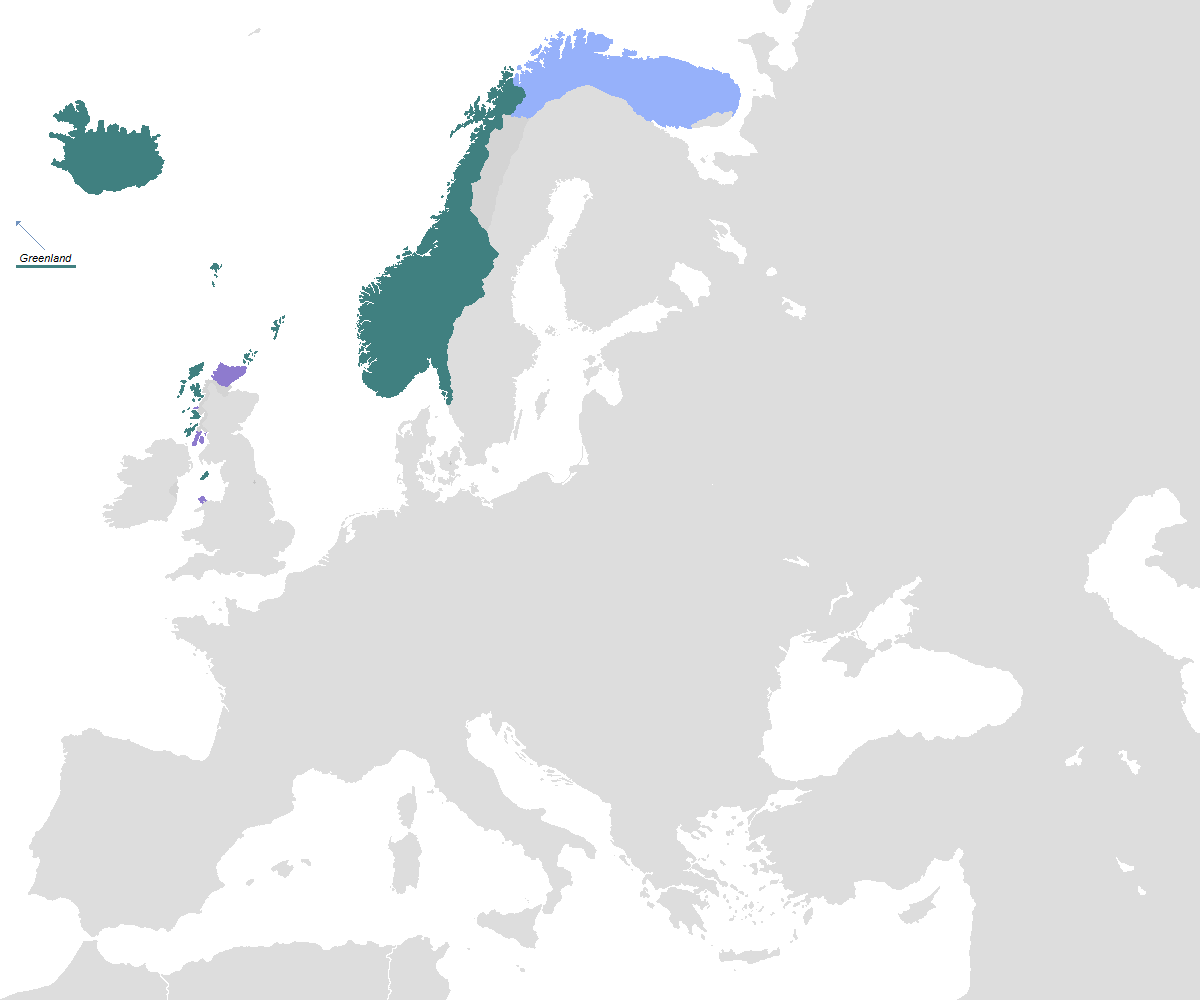
Norway at its greatest extent, around 1263.

The House of Sverre (Norwegian: Sverreætten) was a Norwegian royal dynasty founded by King Sverre Sigurdsson. Members of the dynasty occupied the Norwegian throne at various times between the late 12th century and 1319.

== History ==
The dynasty was founded by Sverre Sigurdsson, who claimed to be an illegitimate son of King Sigurd II Munn. Sverre's claimed paternity has been questioned by modern historians.

Under Sverre's grandson Haakon IV, the civil war era in Norway came to an end, and the Norwegian kingdom reached the height of its power in the High Middle Ages.

Margaret, Maid of Norway, daughter of King Eric II, was also a member of the dynasty. She was recognized as heir to the Scottish throne and died in 1290 while travelling from Norway to Scotland.

The male royal line of the dynasty ended with the death of Haakon V in 1319. He was succeeded by his daughter's son, Magnus VII, who belonged patrilineally to the House of Bjälbo. Through Haakon V's daughter Ingeborg, descendants of the House of Sverre also entered the ancestry of the House of Oldenburg. Her descendants included Christian I, who became king of Denmark in 1448 and of Norway in 1450.

== Coat of arms ==
The main arms of the kings belonging to the House of Sverre, was a golden crowned lion on a red field. The lion was later supplied with a silver axe symbolising Olaf the Holy. This became the coat of arms of Norway.

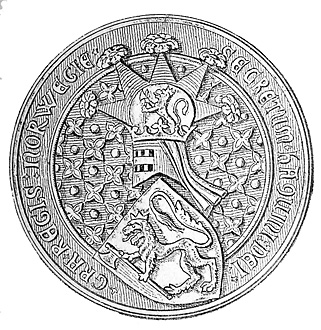
Seal of King Haakon V Magnusson, the last king belonging to the House of Sverre.

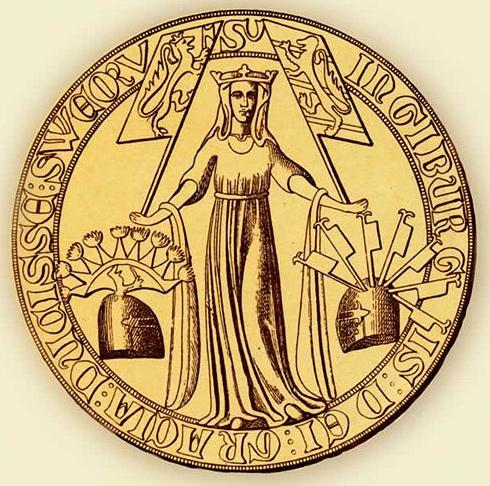
Seal of King Haakon V Magnusson's daughter, Duchess Ingeborg.

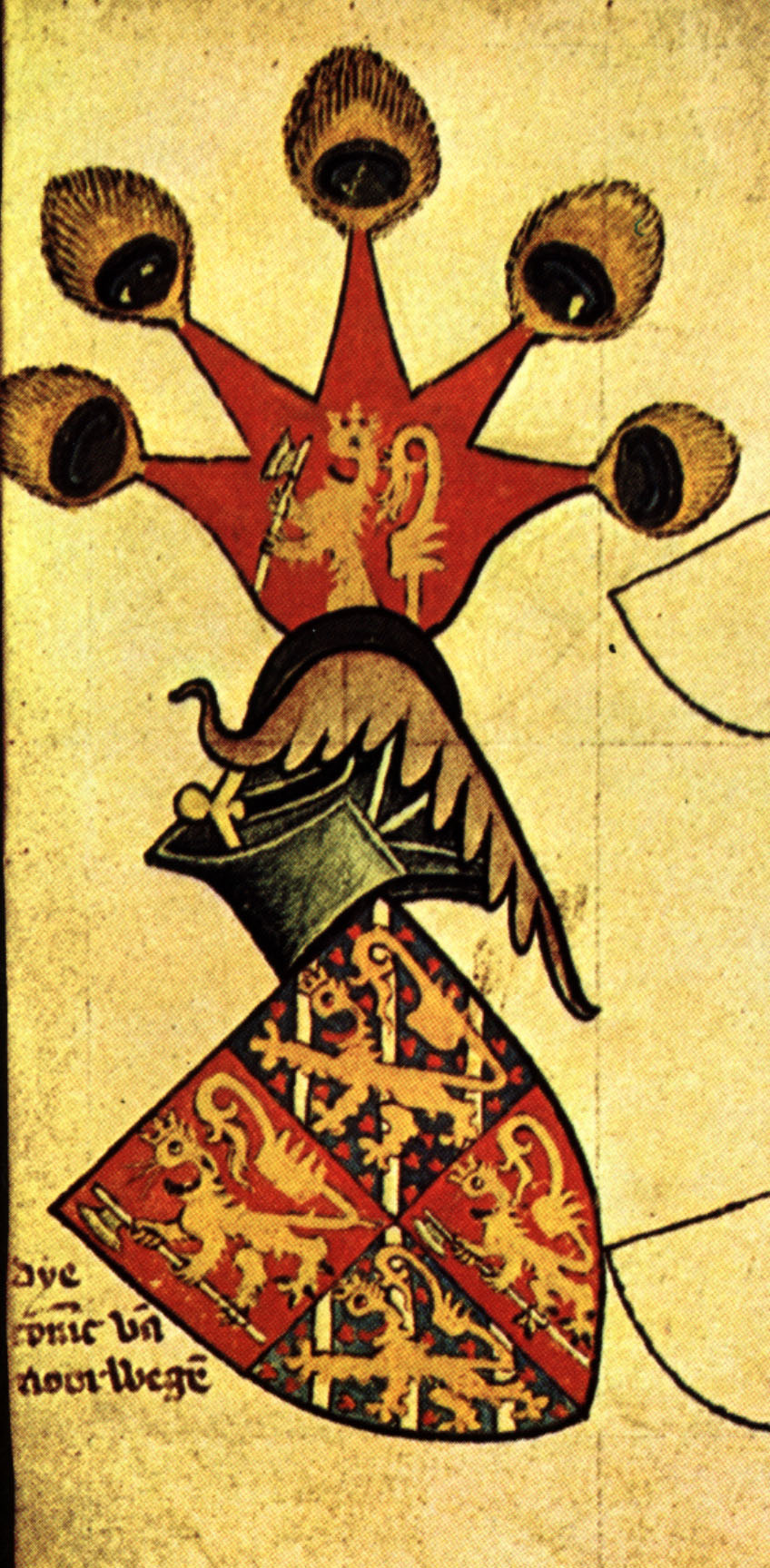
Arms of King Haakon V Magnusson's daughter's son, King Haakon VI Magnusson, who was of the House of Bjälbo. His coat of arms includes the Sverre arms and the Bjälbo arms.

== List of kings ==
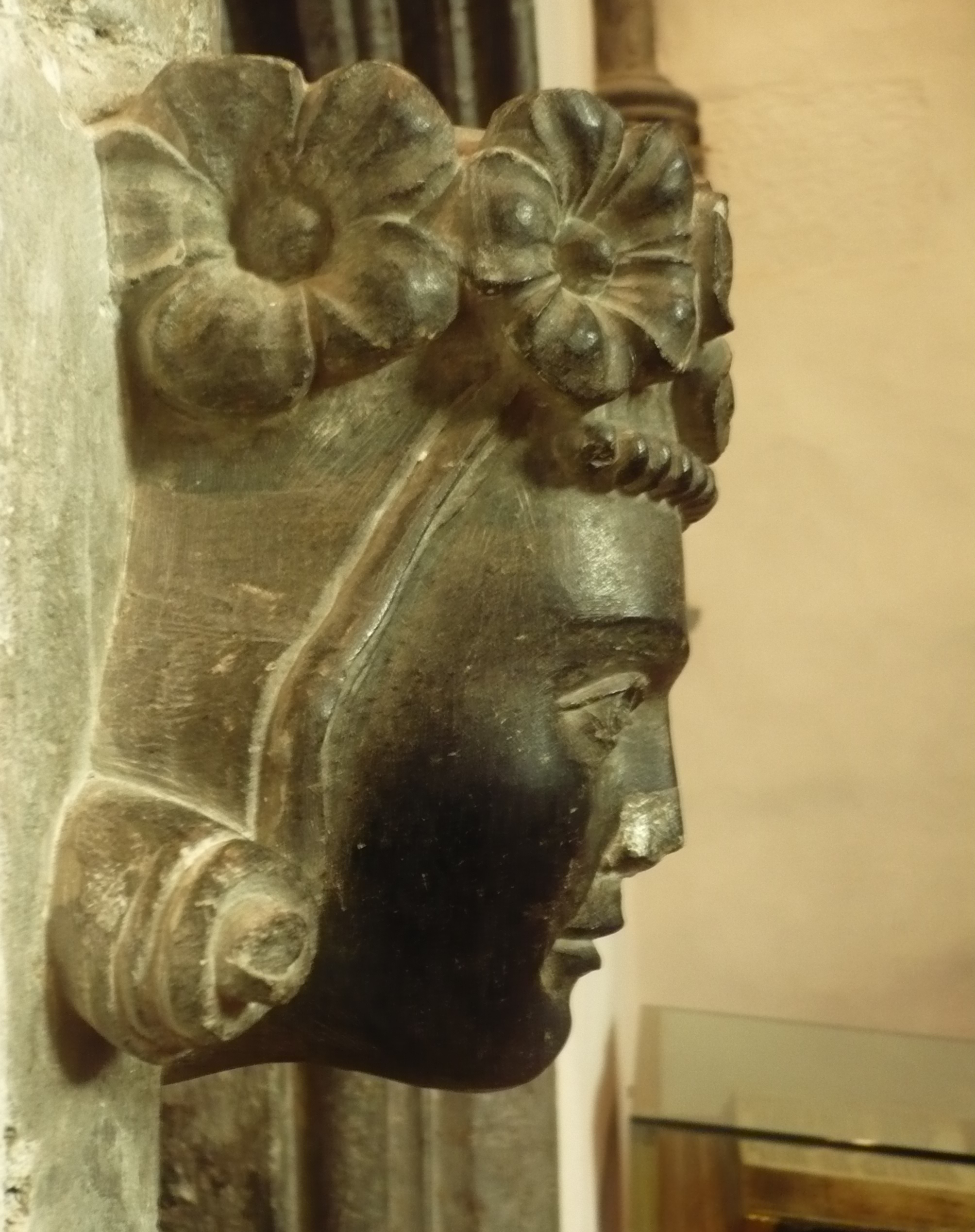
A sculpture believed to depict King Haakon V Magnusson as Duke of Oslo, Oppland, Ryfylke, the Faroe Islands, and Shetland.

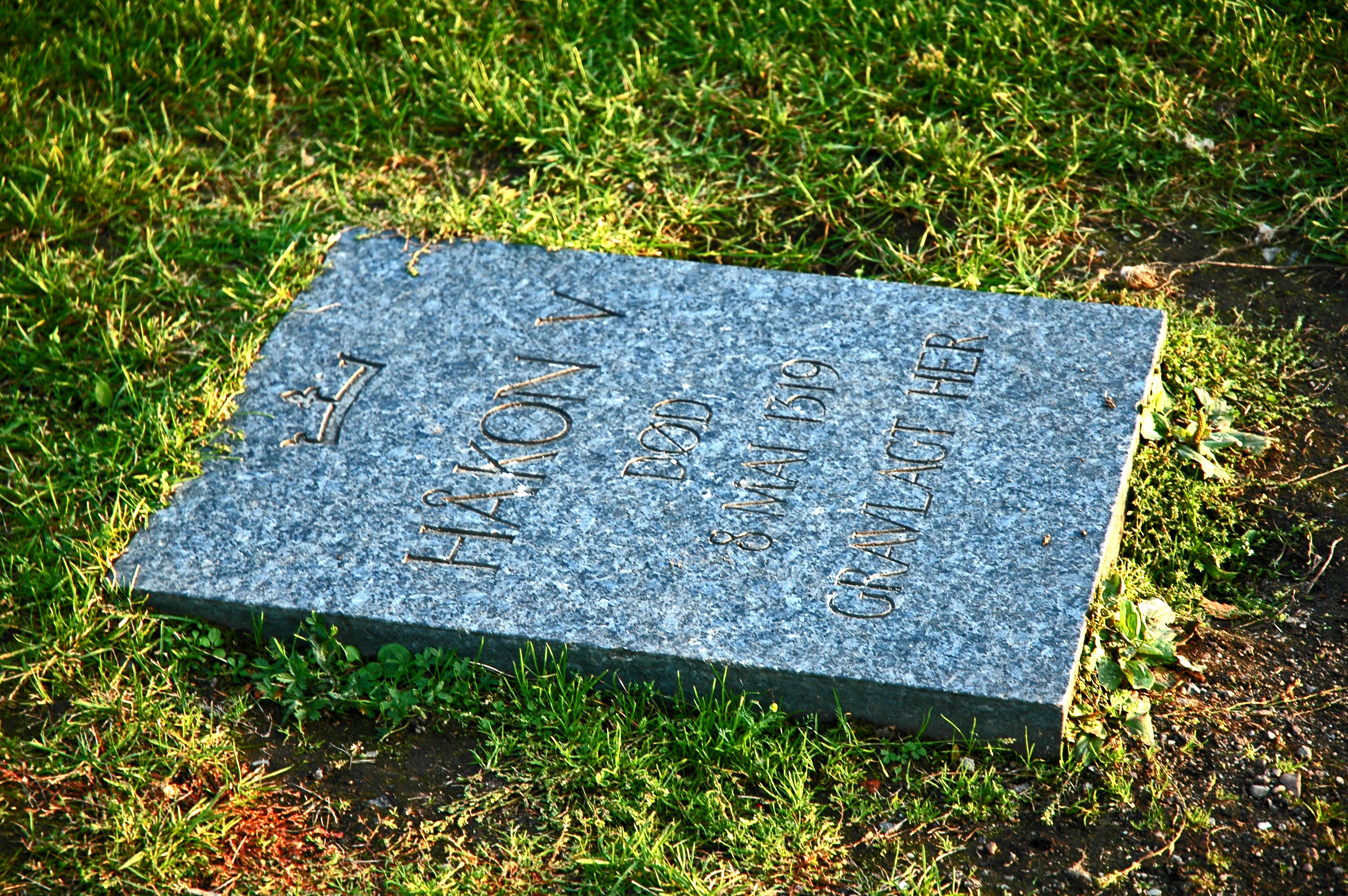
Burial site of Haakon V Magnusson at Akershus Fortress in Oslo.

The dynasty sometimes had a junior king reigning alongside a senior king. In such cases, three dates are given: the beginning of the junior kingship, the beginning of the senior kingship, and the end of the reign. The following is a list of rulers during the periods in which the dynasty held the Norwegian throne:

Name	Reign
Sverre Sigurdsson	1184–1202
Haakon III Sverresson	1202–1204
Guttorm Sigurdsson	1204
Dynastic interruption: Inge II Baardson of the Gille branch (1204–1217)
Haakon IV the Old	1217–1263
Haakon Haakonsson the Young	1240–1257
Magnus VI Lagabøte	1257–1263–1280
Eric II Magnusson	1273–1280–1299
Haakon V Magnusson	1299–1319

== Family tree ==
Members of the family are marked with red, and the monarchs of the family as bolded.

**Sverre**; King of Norway	Margaret of Sweden
Sigurd Lavard	**Haakon III**; King of Norway	Inga of Varteig	Christina of Norway	Philip Simonsson; Bagler pretender
**Guttorm**; King of Norway	Kanga the Young	**Haakon IV**; King of Norway	Margaret Skulesdatter
Sigurd Haakonsson	Gregorius Andresson; Lendmann	Cecilia Haakonsdotter	**Harald Olafsson**; King of Mann and the Isles
Olaf Haakonsson	**Haakon the Young**; Junior King of Norway	Rikissa Birgersdotter	Christina of Norway	Philip; Infante of Castile	**Magnus VI**; King of Norway	Ingeborg of Denmark
Sverre Magnus Haakonsson; Junker	Margaret of Scotland	**Eric II**; King of Norway	Isabel Bruce	Isabelle de Joigny	**Haakon V** King of Norway	Euphemia of Rügen
**Margaret**; Queen of Scotland	Valdemar Magnusson; Prince, Duke of Finland	Ingeborg of Norway	Havtore Jonsson; Baron	Agnes Haakonsdotter; Princesses of Norway	Eric Magnusson; Prince, Duke of Svealand	Ingeborg of Norway
Sudreim claim House of Rosensverd; Princes and of Princesses of Norway	House of Bjälbo

== See also ==
- List of Norwegian monarchs
- Norwegian royal family
- Norwegian nobility
