= Haakon IV =

King of Norway from 1217 to 1263

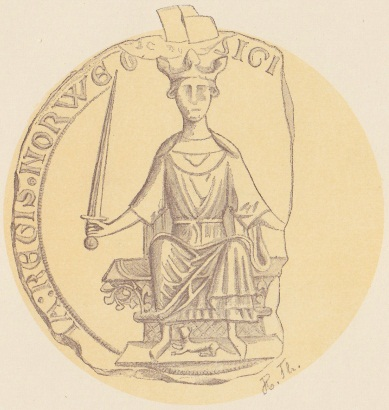
- A drawing of Haakon's seal, from a 1247/48 letter (with reverse). (Note: The seal itself was given to Haakon as a gift from Henry III of England in 1236.)

King of Norway
- Reign: June 1217 – 16 December 1263
- Coronation: 29 July 1247 (Bergen)
- Predecessor: Inge II
- Successor: Magnus the Lawmender
- Junior kings: Haakon the Young (1240–1257); Magnus VI (1257–1263)
- Born: c. March/April 1204; Folkenborg, Norway
- Died: 16 December 1263 (aged 59); Kirkwall, Orkney, Norway
- Burial: St Magnus Cathedral, Kirkwall (until 1264); Old Cathedral of Bergen (destroyed in 1531)
- Spouse: Margaret Skulesdatter (m. 1225)
- Issue among others...: Cecilia, Queen of the Isles (ill.); Haakon the Young; Christina, Lady of Valdecorneja; Magnus VI, King of Norway
- House: Sverre
- Father: Haakon III of Norway
- Mother: Inga of Varteig

Haakon IV Haakonsson (c. March/April 1204 – 16 December 1263; Old Norse: Hákon Hákonarson [ˈhɑːˌkon ˈhɑːˌkonɑrˌson]; Norwegian: Håkon Håkonsson), sometimes called Haakon the Old in contrast to his namesake son, was King of Norway from 1217 to 1263. His reign lasted for 46 years, longer than any Norwegian king since Harald Fairhair. Haakon was born into the troubled civil war era in Norway, but his reign eventually managed to put an end to the internal conflicts. At the start of his reign, during his minority, Earl Skule Bårdsson served as regent. As a king of the Birkebeiner faction, Haakon defeated the uprising of the final Bagler royal pretender, Sigurd Ribbung, in 1227. He put a definitive end to the civil war era when he had Skule Bårdsson killed in 1240, a year after Skule had himself proclaimed king in opposition to Haakon. Haakon thereafter formally appointed his own eldest son, Haakon the Young, as his co-regent.

Under Haakon's rule, medieval Norway is considered to have reached its zenith or golden age. His reputation and formidable naval fleet allowed him to maintain friendships with both the pope and the Holy Roman Emperor, despite their conflict. He was at different points offered the imperial crown by the pope, the High Kingship of Ireland by a delegation of Irish kings, and the command of the French crusader fleet by the French king. He amplified the influence of European culture in Norway by importing and translating contemporary European literature into Old Norse, and by constructing monumental European-style stone buildings. In conjunction with this he employed an active and aggressive foreign policy, and at the end of his rule added Iceland and the Norse Greenland community to his kingdom, leaving the Norwegian realm at its territorial height. Although he for the moment managed to secure Norwegian control of the islands off the northern and western shores of Scotland, plus the Isle of Man, he fell ill and died when wintering in Orkney following some military engagements with the expanding Kingdom of Scotland. He was succeeded by his second son, Magnus VI.

== Historical sources ==
The main source of information concerning Haakon is the Saga of Haakon Haakonsson, which was written in the years immediately following his death. Commissioned by his son Magnus, it was written by the Icelandic writer and politician Sturla Þórðarson (nephew of the famous historian Snorri Sturluson). Having come into conflict with the royal representative in Iceland, Sturla came to Norway in 1263 in an attempt to reconcile with Haakon. When he arrived, he learned that Haakon was in Scotland, and that Magnus ruled Norway in his place. While Magnus initially took an unfriendly attitude towards Sturla, his talents as a story-teller and skald eventually won him the favour of Magnus and his men. The saga is considered the most detailed and reliable of all sagas concerning Norwegian kings, building on both written archive material and oral information from individuals who had been close to Haakon. It is nonetheless written openly in support of the political program of the House of Sverre, and the legitimacy of Haakon's kingship.

== Background and childhood ==
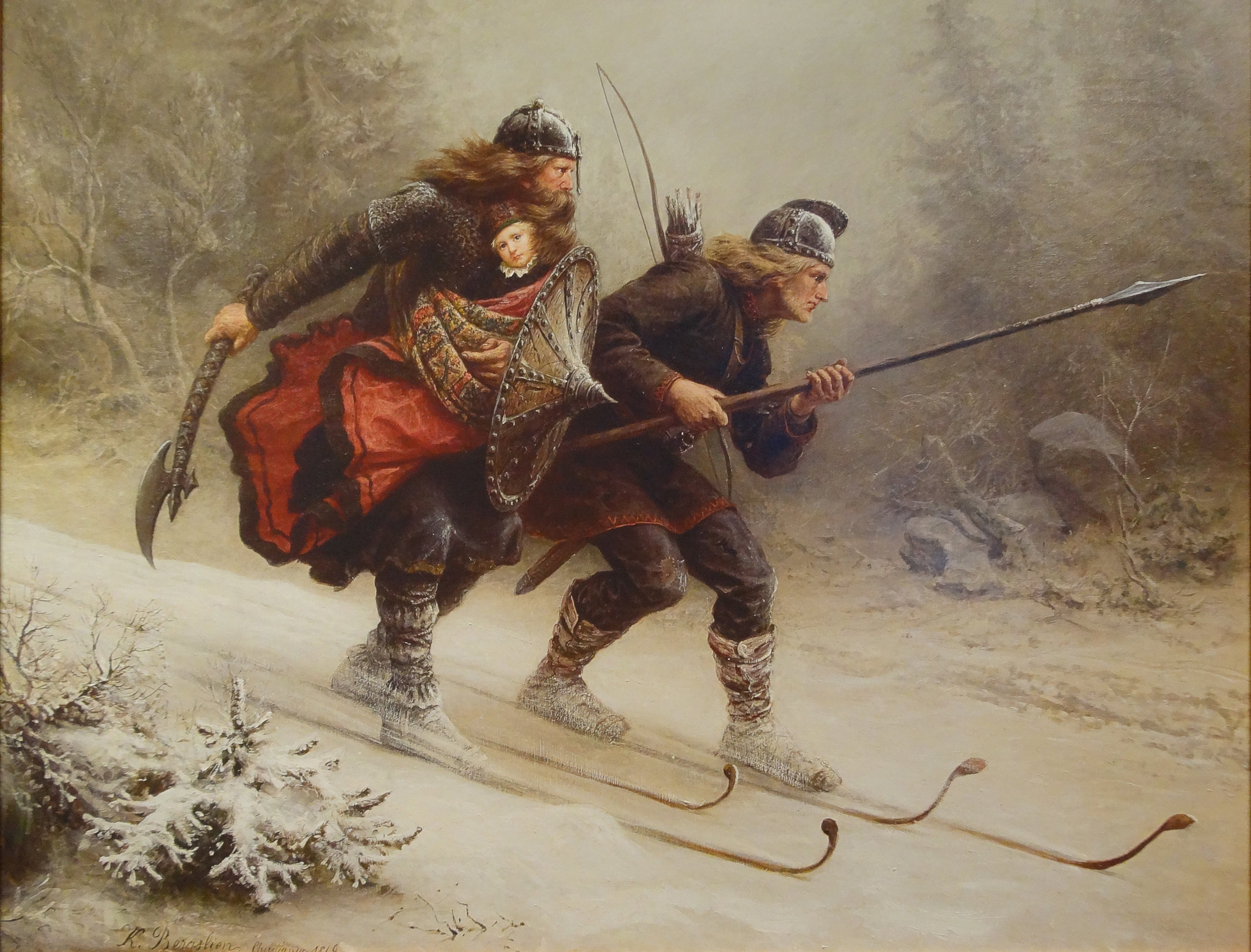
19th-century impression of the birkebeiner bringing the infant Haakon to safety by Knud Bergslien

Haakon was born in Folkenborg (now in Eidsberg) to Inga of Varteig in the summer of 1204, probably in March or April. The father was widely regarded to have been King Haakon Sverresson, as Inga had been with Haakon in his hostel in Borg (now Sarpsborg) in late 1203. King Haakon was the leader of the Birkebeiner faction in the ongoing civil war against the Bagler faction. He was dead by the time his son Haakon was born (many believed to have been poisoned by his Swedish stepmother Margaret), but Inga's claim was supported by several of the king's followers. Haakon was born in Bagler-controlled territory, and his mother's claim placed them in a dangerous position. When the Baglers started hunting Haakon, a group of Birkebeiners fled with the child in the winter of 1205/06, heading for Inge Bårdsson, the new Birkebeiner king in Nidaros (now Trondheim). As the party was struck by a blizzard, two of the best Birkebeiner skiers, Torstein Skevla and Skjervald Skrukka, carried on with the child over the mountain from Lillehammer to Østerdalen. They eventually managed to bring Haakon to safety with King Inge; this particular event is commemorated in modern-day Norway by the popular annual skiing event Birkebeinerrennet. Haakon's dramatic childhood was often parallelled with that of former king Olaf Tryggvasson (who introduced Christianity to Norway), as well as with the gospels and Child Jesus, which served an important ideological function for his kingship.

In the saga, Haakon is described as bright and witty, and as being small for his age. When he was three years old, he was captured by the Baglers but refused to call the Bagler king Philip Simonsson his lord (he nonetheless came from the capture unharmed). When he learned at the age of eight that King Inge Bårdsson and his brother Earl Haakon the Crazy had made an agreement for the succession to the throne that excluded himself, Haakon pointed out that the agreement was invalid due to his attorney not having been present. He subsequently identified his attorney as "God and Saint Olaf." Haakon was notably the first Norwegian king to receive formal education at a school. From the late civil war era, the government administration relied increasingly on written communication, which in turn demanded literate leaders. When Haakon was in Bergen under the care of Haakon the Crazy, he began his education at the age of seven, likely at the Bergen Cathedral School. He continued his education under King Inge at the Trondheim Cathedral School after the Earl's death in 1214. Haakon was brought up alongside Inge's son Guttorm, and they were treated as the same. When he was eleven, some of Haakon's friends provoked the king by asking him to give Haakon a region to govern. When Haakon was approached by the men and was urged to take up arms against Inge, he rejected it in part because of his young age and its bad prospects, as well as because he believed it would be morally wrong to fight Inge and thus split the Birkebeiner. He instead said that he prayed that God would give him his share of his father's inheritance when the time was right.

== Reign ==
=== Succession struggle ===
After King Inge's death in 1217, a succession dispute erupted. Haakon was supported by the majority of Birkebeiners, including the veterans who had served under his father and grandfather. Other candidates included Inge's illegitimate son Guttorm (who dropped out very soon); Inge's half-brother Earl Skule Bårdsson, who had been appointed leader of the king's hird at Inge's deathbed and was supported by the Archbishop of Nidaros as well as part of the Birkebeiners; and Haakon the Crazy's son, Knut Haakonsson. With his widespread popular support in Trøndelag and western Norway, Haakon was proclaimed king at Øyrating in June 1217. He was later the same year hailed as king at Gulating in Bergen, and at Haugating, Borgarting and local things east of Elven (Göta Älv). While Skule's supporters initially had attempted to cast doubt about Haakon's royal ancestry, they eventually suspended open resistance to his candidacy. As the dispute could have divided the Birkebeiners, Skule settled on becoming regent for Haakon during his minority.

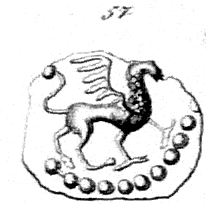
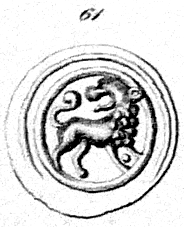
Two coins (bracteates) from Haakon's reign. While a few of his coins included the inscription "REX HACV" (when with Earl Skule "REX ET COMES"), most only contained images of animals, a crowned head, a crown, a castle, or single letters.

In connection with the dispute over the royal election, Haakon's mother Inga had to prove his parentage through a trial by ordeal in Bergen in 1218. The result of the trial strengthened the legal basis for his kingship, and improved his relationship with the Church. The saga's claim that Haakon already had been generally accepted as king in 1217/18 has however been contested by modern historians such as Sverre Bagge. Skule and Haakon increasingly drifted apart in their administration, and Skule focused mainly on governing Eastern Norway after 1220, which he had gained the right to rule in 1218 as his third of the Norwegian kingdom. From 1221 to 1223, Haakon and Skule separately issued letters as rulers of Norway, and maintained official contacts abroad. In 1223 a great meeting of bishops, clergy, secular nobles, and other high-ranking figures from all across the country was held in Bergen to decide finally on Haakon's right to the throne. Other candidates to the throne were present either personally or through attorneys, but Haakon was in the end unanimously confirmed as King of Norway by the court.

The last Bagler king Philip Simonsson died in 1217. Speedy political and military manoeuvering by Skule led to a reconciliation between the Birkebeiners and Baglers, and thus the reunification of the kingdom. However, some discontented Baglers found a new royal pretender, Sigurd Ribbung, and launched a new rising from 1219. The rising only gained support in parts of Eastern Norway, and was did not gain control of Viken and Opplandene as the Baglers formerly had done. In the summer of 1223, Skule forced the Ribbungar to surrender. However, The great meeting in Bergen soon after renewed the division of the Norwegian kingdom, with Skule gaining control of the northern third of the country instead of the east, in what marked a setback despite his military victory. In 1224, Sigurd escaped from Skule's custody, and Haakon was left to fight him alone as the new ruler of Eastern Norway. Skule remained passive throughout the rest of the war, and his support for Haakon was lukewarm at best. Assuming the military lead in the fight, Haakon nevertheless defeated Ribbung through comprehensive and organisationally demanding warfare over the next few years. As part of the campaign, Haakon additionally led a large army into the Värmland district of Sweden in 1225, to punish the inhabitants for their support of Sigurd. Sigurd died in 1226, and the revolt was finally quashed in 1227 with the surrender of its last leader, Haakon the Crazy's son Knut Haakonsson. This left Haakon more or less uncontested monarch.

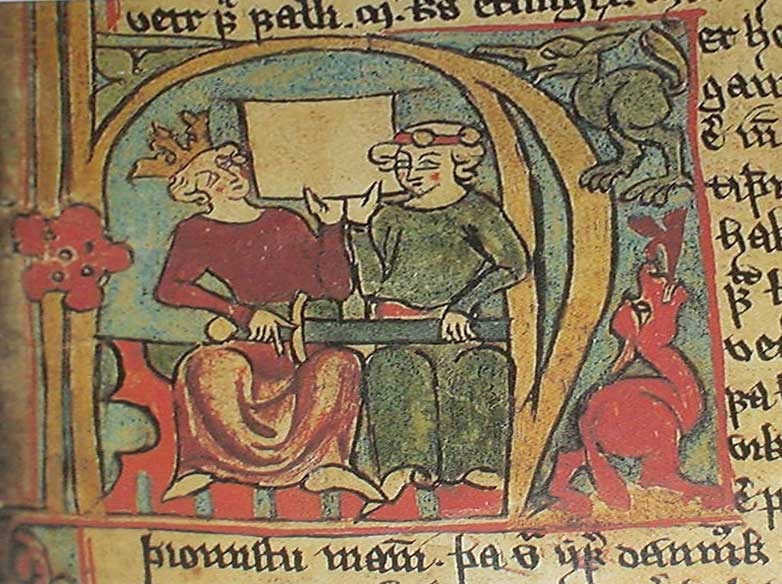
Haakon and Skule Bårdsson, from the 14th century Icelandic Flateyjarbók.

Haakon's councillors had sought to reconcile Haakon and Skule by proposing marriage between Haakon and Skule's daughter Margaret in 1219. Haakon accepted the proposal (although he did not think it would change much politically), but the marriage between Haakon and Margrete did not take place before 1225, partly due to the conflict with Sigurd. The relationship between Haakon and Skule nevertheless deteriorated further during the 1230s, and attempted settlements at meetings in 1233 and 1236 only distanced them more from each other. Periodically, the two nonetheless reconciled and spent a great amount of time together, only to have their friendship destroyed - according to the saga, by intrigues derived from rumours and slander by men who played the two against each other. Skule was the first person in Norway to be titled duke (hertug) in 1237, but instead of control over a region, gained the rights to the incomes from a third of the syssels scattered across the whole of Norway. This was part of an attempt by Haakon to limit Skule's power. In 1239 the conflict between the two erupted into open warfare when Skule had himself proclaimed king. Although he had some support in Trøndelag, Opplandene, and eastern Viken, he could not stand up to Haakon's forces. The rebellion ended when Skule was killed in 1240, leaving Haakon the undisputed king of Norway. This revolt is generally taken to mark the final end of Norway's civil war era.

=== Recognition by the Pope ===
Coats of arms accorded to Haakon by Matthew Paris.

While the Church in Norway initially had refused to recognise Haakon as King of Norway, it had largely turned to support his claim to the throne by the 1223 meeting, although later disagreements occurred. Despite being the undisputed ruler of Norway after 1240, Haakon was still not approved as king by the pope due to his illegitimate birth. He nonetheless had a strong personal desire to be approved fully as a European king. Several papal commissions were appointed to investigate the matter, and Haakon declared his legitimate son Haakon the Young his successor instead of an older living illegitimate son. Although Haakon had children with his mistress Kanga the Young prior to his marriage with Margrete, it was his children with Margrete who were designated as his successors in accordance with a papal recognition. The Catholic principle of legitimacy was thus established in the Norwegian order of succession, although Haakon's new law still maintained that illegitimate children could be designated as successor in the absence of any legitimate children or grandchildren—contrary to Catholic principles. While his strong position allowed him to set boundaries to the Church's political influence, he was on the other hand prepared to give the Church much autonomy in internal affairs and relations with the rural society.

Haakon also attempted to strengthen his ties with the papacy by taking a vow to go on Crusade. In 1241, he converted this into a vow of waging war against pagan peoples in the north in light of the Mongol invasion of Europe. When a group of Karelians ("Bjarmians") had been forced westwards by the Mongols, Haakon allowed them to stay in the area surrounding the Malangen fjord and had them Christianized—something that would please the papacy. Later, in 1248, Louis IX of France proposed (by Matthew Paris as messenger) to Haakon to join him for a Crusade, with Haakon as commander of the fleet, but Haakon declined. While Haakon had been unsuccessful in gaining the recognition of Pope Gregory IX, he quickly gained the support from Pope Innocent IV who sought alliances in his struggle with Holy Roman Emperor Frederick II. Haakon finally achieved royal recognition by Pope Innocent in 1246, and Cardinal William of Sabina was sent to Bergen and crowned Haakon in 1247.

=== Cultural influence and legal reforms ===
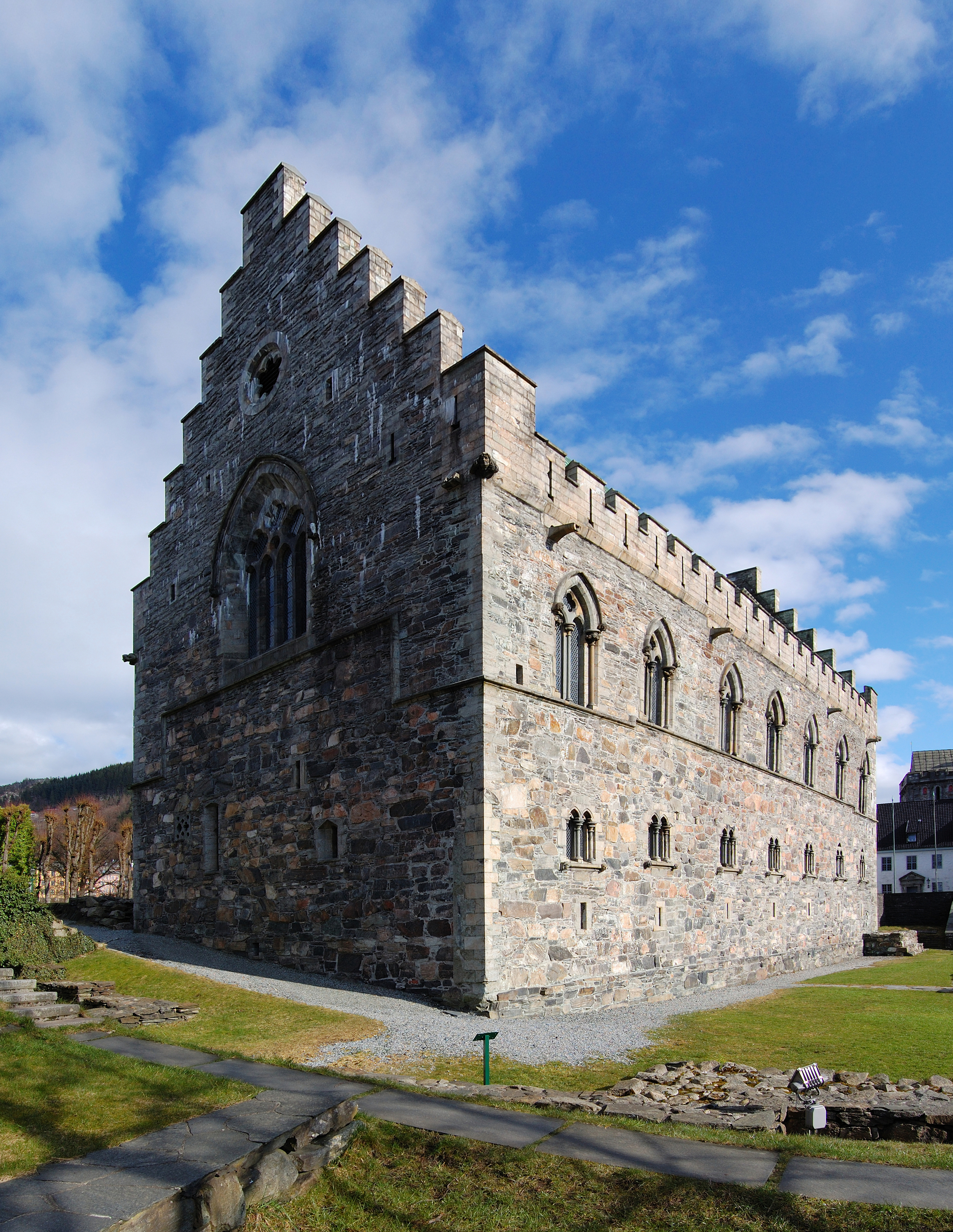
Haakon's Hall in Bergen, constructed in the mid-13th century.

After consolidating his position in 1240, Haakon focused on displaying the supremacy of the kingship, influenced by the increasingly closer contact with European culture. He built several monumental royal buildings, primarily in the royal estate in Bergen, where he built a European-style stone palace. He used a grand fleet with stately royal ships when meeting with other Scandinavian rulers, and actively sent letters and gifts to other European rulers; his most far-reaching contact was achieved when he sent gyrfalcons with an embassy to the sultan of Tunis.

The royal court in Bergen also started importing and translating the first true European literature that became available to a wider Norwegian audience. The literature which was popular then was heroic-romantic literature derived from the French and, in turn, English courts, notably chansons de geste around Charlemagne (the Matter of France) and tales of King Arthur (the Matter of Britain). The first work that was translated into Old Norse was reportedly the Arthurian romantic story Tristan and Iseult, which was finished in 1226 after orders from the young and newly-wed Haakon. Haakon's programme seems to have been the spark for the emergence of a new Norse genre of chivalric sagas.

Haakon also had the popular religious text Visio Tnugdali translated into Old Norse as Duggals leiðsla. The literature also appealed to women, and both Haakon's wife Margrete and his daughter Kristina owned richly illustrated psalters.

Haakon also initiated legal reforms which were crucial for the development of justice in Norway. Haakon's "New Law", written around 1260, was a breakthrough for both the idea and practice of public justice, as opposed to the traditional Norwegian customs of feuds and revenge. The influence of the reforms is also apparent in Haakon's Konungs skuggsjá ("King's Mirror"), an educational text intended for his son Magnus, which was probably written in cooperation with the royal court in the mid-1250s.

=== Involvements abroad ===
Relations were hostile with both Sweden and Denmark from the start of his reign. During Haakon's rivalry with Earl Skule, Skule sought the support of Valdemar II of Denmark, but any aid was made impossible after Valdemar's capture by one of his vassals. Since the Danes wanted overlordship of Norway and supported the Guelphs (those supporting the Pope over the Holy Roman Emperor), Haakon in turn sought closer ties with the Ghibelline Emperor Frederick II, who sent ambassadors to Norway. As Haakon had gained a powerful reputation due to the strength of his fleet, other European rulers wanted to benefit from his friendship. Despite the struggle between the Pope and the Emperor, Haakon was able to maintain friendships with both. According to an English chronicler, the Pope wanted Haakon to become Holy Roman Emperor. It has been suggested that Haakon hesitated to leave Norway due to the Mongol threat.

Haakon pursued a foreign policy that was active in all directions (although foremost to the west and south-east). In the north-east, the relationship with Novgorod had been tense due to a dispute over the right to tax the Sami people, as well as raiding from both Norwegian and Karelian sides. The Russians were previously viewed as potential allies, and in the winter of 1250–1251, Prince Alexander Nevsky sent an embassy to Haakon following a conflict between Novgorodian and Norwegian tax-collectors. As a result of these negotiations, Norwegian control of Troms and Finnmark was likely strengthened. Alexander also asked for the hand of Haakon's daughter, Christina, but Haakon refused as Novgorod was viewed as a dependency of the Mongols and a marital alliance would have complicated relations with the Russian princes. With Norwegian ships from the port of Elven were active in the waters south of Sweden and into the Baltic Sea, Norway increasingly relied on Baltic grain from Lübeck. This trade was halted in the late 1240s by the plundering of Norwegian ships in Danish seas by ships from Lübeck. In 1250, Haakon made a peace and trade agreement with Lübeck, which eventually also opened the city of Bergen to the Hanseatic League. During the conflict, Haakon had reportedly been offered control over the city by Emperor Frederick II. In any case, Haakon's policy regarding Northern German ports largely derived from his strategy of attempting to exploit the internal turmoil in Denmark after the death of King Valdemar II in 1241.

In Scandinavia, Haakon regularly met with neighbouring rulers in the border-area around Elven from the late 1240s through the 1250s. He sent grand fleets as embassies; some reportedly numbered over 300 ships. Haakon also reconciled with the Swedes when he his son Haakon the Young married Rikissa, a daughter of Swedish leader Earl Birger. Haakon sought to expand his kingdom southwards of Elven into the Danish province of Halland. He thus looked for alliance with the Swedes, as well as ties with opponents of the ruling line of monarchs of Denmark. In 1249, Haakon allied with Earl Birger for a joint Swedish-Norwegian invasion into Halland and Scania, but the agreement was eventually abandoned by the Swedes (see Treaty of Lödöse). Haakon claimed Halland in 1253, and finally invaded the province on his own in 1256, demanding it as compensation for the looting of Norwegian ships in Danish seas. But he renounced this claim in a 1257 peace agreement with Christopher I of Denmark. Haakon thereafter negotiated a marriage between his only remaining son, Magnus, and Christopher's niece Ingeborg. Haakon's Nordic policies initiated the build-up to the later personal unions (called the Kalmar Union), that in the end had dire consequences for Norway as it did not have the economic and military resources to persevere and maintain Haakon's aggressive policies.

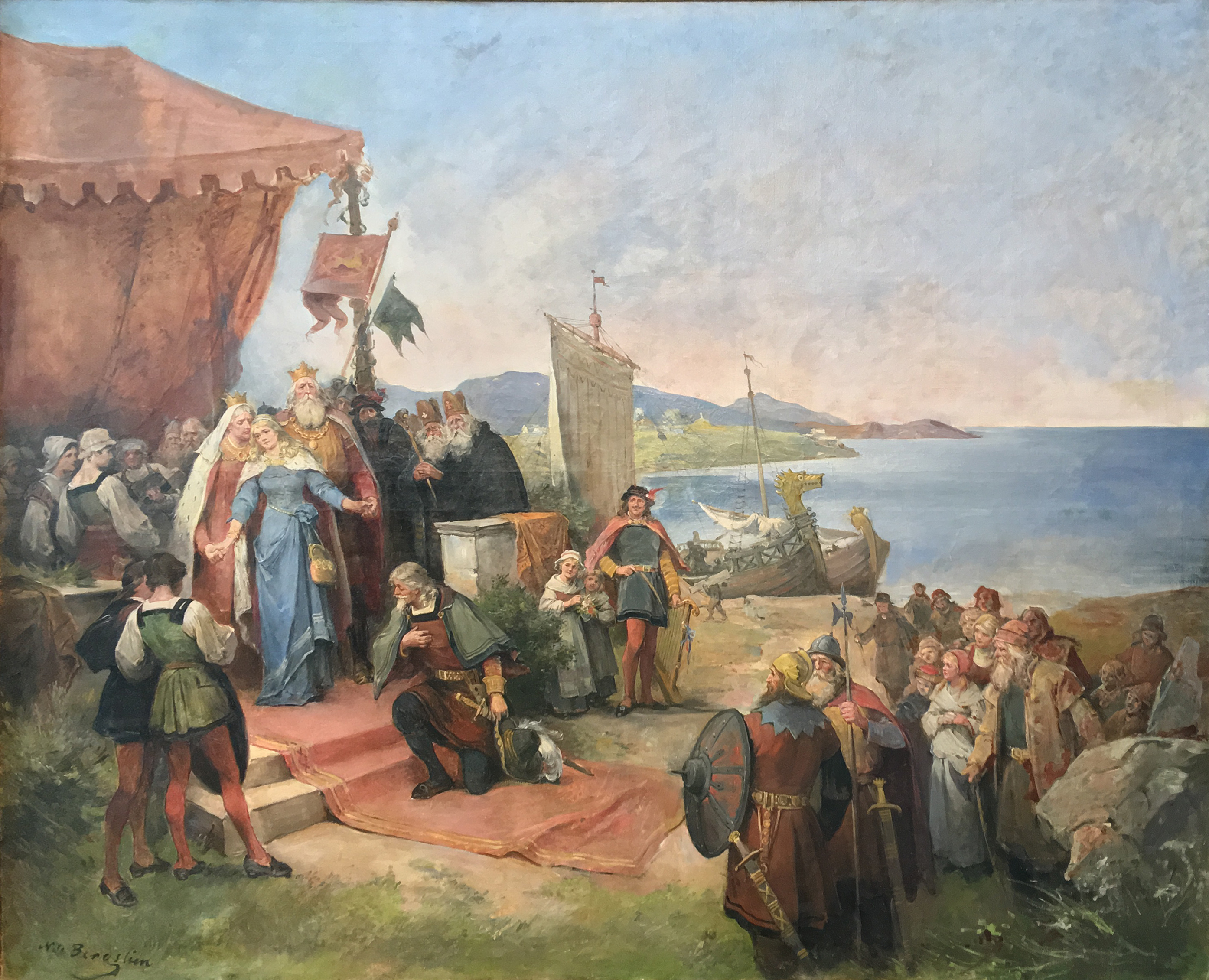
The painting Kristina's departure to Spain by Nils Bergslien (1852–1928) imagines Haakon's daughter Christina setting off to Spain in 1257.

More distantly, Haakon sought an alliance with Alfonso X of Castile (a potential next Holy Roman emperor) chiefly as it would guarantee new supplies of grain to Castile in light of rising prices in England, and possibly giving access to Baltic grain through Norwegian control of Lübeck. Alfonso in turn sought to expand his influence in Northern Europe, as well as to gain Norwegian naval assistance for the campaign or crusade he had proposed in Morocco (seeing that the Iberian Moors received backing overseas from North Africa). Haakon could thus potentially also fulfill his papal vow of crusade, although he likely did not intend to. He sent an embassy to Castile in 1255. A Castilian ambassador to Norway returned with the embassy, and proposed to establish the "strongest ties of friendship" with Haakon. At the request of Alfonso, Haakon sent his daughter Christina to Castile to marry one of Alfonso's brothers. However, Christina died four years later without children, which marked the effective end of the short-lived alliance, and the proposed crusade fell into the blue.

=== The Scottish expedition and death ===
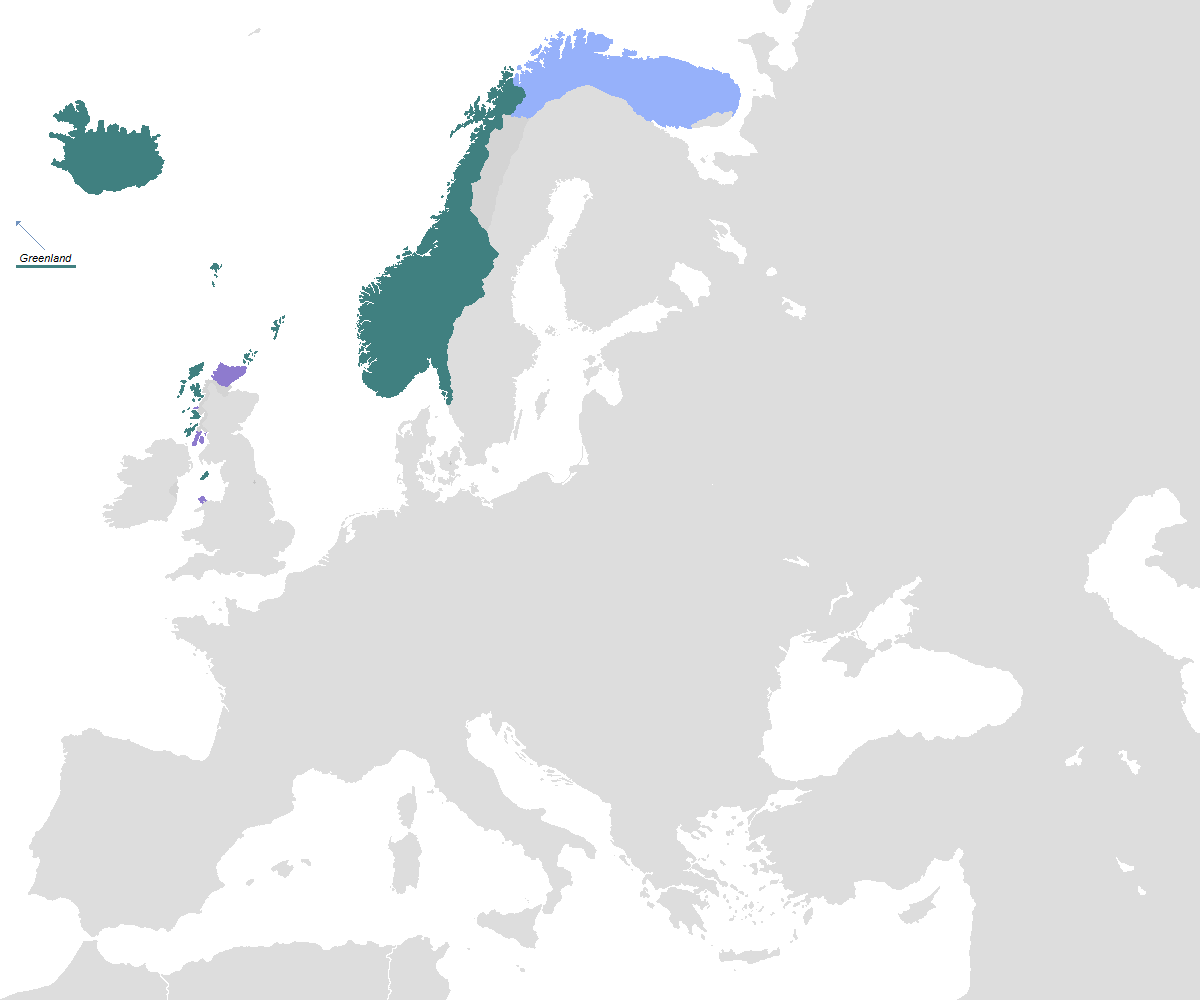
Medieval Norway at its greatest extent, around the time of Haakon's death.

Haakon employed an active and aggressive foreign policy to strengthen Norwegian ties in the west. His policy relied on friendship and trade with the King of England; the first known Norwegian trade agreements were made with England in the years 1217–23 (England's first commercial treaties were also made with Norway), and the friendship with Henry III of England was a cornerstone of Haakon's foreign policy. As they had become kings around the same time, Haakon wrote to Henry in 1224 that he wished they could maintain the friendship that had existed between their fathers. Haakon sought to defend the Norwegian sovereignty over islands in the west, namely the Hebrides and Man (under the Kingdom of Mann and the Isles), Shetland and Orkney (under the Earldom of Orkney), and the Faroe Islands. Further, the Norse community in Greenland agreed to submit to the Norwegian crown in 1261, and in 1262 Haakon achieved one of his long-standing ambitions when he incorporated Iceland into his kingdom by exploiting the island's internal conflicts in his favour. The dependency on Norwegian maritime trade and their subordination to the Nidaros ecclesiastical province were some of the key reasons which allowed Haakon to assert sovereignty over the islands. The Norwegian kingdom was at the largest it has ever been by the end of Haakon's reign.

Norwegian control over the Faroe Islands and Shetland was strong due to the importance of Bergen as a trading centre, while Orkney, the Hebrides, and Man had more natural ties with the Scottish mainland. Although traditionally having had ties with the community of Norse settlers in northern Scotland, Scottish rulers had increasingly asserted their sovereignty over the entire mainland. Haakon had at the same time gained stronger control of the Hebrides and Man than any Norwegian ruler since Magnus Barefoot. As part of a new development the Scottish king Alexander II claimed the Hebrides and asked to buy the islands from Norway, but Haakon staunchly rejected the proposals. Following Alexander II's death, his son Alexander III continued and stepped up his father's policy by sending an embassy to Norway in 1261, and thereafter attacking the Hebrides.

In 1263, the dispute with the Scottish king over the Hebrides induced Haakon to undertake an expedition to the islands. Haakon learned in 1262 that Scottish nobles had raided the Hebrides and that Alexander III planned to conquer the islands. In 1263 Haakon mounted an expedition with his formidable leidang fleet of at least 120 ships. He had become accustomed to negotiating while backed by an intimidating fleet. The fleet left Bergen in July, and reached Shetland and Orkney in August, where they were joined by chieftains from the Hebrides and Man. Alexander started negotiations after Norwegian landings on the Scottish mainland, but the Scots purposely prolonged the talks. The Scots waited until September and October for weather that would be trouble for Haakon's fleet. A Scottish force met a smaller Norwegian force at the Battle of Largs (2 October). Although the battle was inconclusive, Haakon withdrew to Orkney for the winter. A delegation of Irish kings invited Haakon to become the High King of Ireland and expel the Anglo-Norman settlers in Ireland, but this was apparently rejected against Haakon's wish.

Haakon over-wintered at the Bishop's Palace in Kirkwall, Orkney, with plans to resume his campaign the next year. During his stay in Kirkwall he however fell ill, and died in the early hours of 16 December 1263. Haakon was buried in the St Magnus Cathedral in Kirkwall for the winter; in spring, his body was exhumed and taken back to Norway, where he was buried in the Old Cathedral in his capital Bergen. Centuries later, in 1531, the cathedral was demolished by the commander of Bergenhus, Eske Bille, for military purposes in connection with the Protestant Reformation, and the graves of Haakon and other Norwegian kings buried there might have been destroyed in the process or moved to another location.

== Evaluation ==
Norwegian historians have held differing views on Haakon's reign. In the 19th century, P. A. Munch portrayed Haakon as a mighty, almost flawless ruler, which in turn influenced Henrik Ibsen in his 1863 play The Pretenders. In the early 20th century, poet Hans E. Kinck countered and viewed Haakon as an insignificant king subordinated to forces outside of his control, a view which influenced historians such as Halvdan Koht and Edvard Bull, Sr. Haakon has often been compared with Skule Bårdsson, and historians have taken sides in the old conflict. While Munch saw Skule as a traitor to the rightful Norwegian king, Koht viewed Skule as a heroic figure. On more sketchy grounds, Kinck praised Skule as representing the original and dying Norse culture, and Haakon as a superficial emulator of foreign culture. Since the 1960s, historians including Narve Bjørgo, Per Sveaas Andersen, Knut Helle, Svein Haga, and Kåre Lunden have in turn professed a reaction against Koht's view. According to Sverre Bagge, modern historians tend to follow Koht when it comes to see Skule's rebellion as a last desperate attempt to stop Haakon from encroaching on Skule's power, but lean closer to Munch's overall evaluation of the two men.

Knut Helle interprets the saga to leave an impression of Skule as a skilled warrior and politician, while noting that the author of the saga purposely created a diffuse image of his role in the conflict with Haakon. On the other hand, Helle notes that Skule was outmaneuvered with relative ease by Haakon's supporters in the years immediately after 1217, and that this may suggest some limited abilities. While neither giving a clear picture of Haakon, Helle maintains that Haakon "obviously" learned to master the political game in his early years. He interprets Haakon as an independent and strong-willed ruler to whom he assigns a "significant personal responsibility" for the policies pursued during his reign: notably regarding the internal consolidation of the kingship, the orientation towards European culture and the aggressive foreign policy. In his article in Norsk biografisk leksikon, Knut Helle acknowledges that Haakon was empowered by the strong institutional position of the kingship at the end of his reign (which he had developed himself), and that his policies were not always successful. Helle nonetheless recognises the substantial political abilities and powerful determination Haakon must have had in order to progress from the difficult position in which he started his reign.

== Children and marriage ==
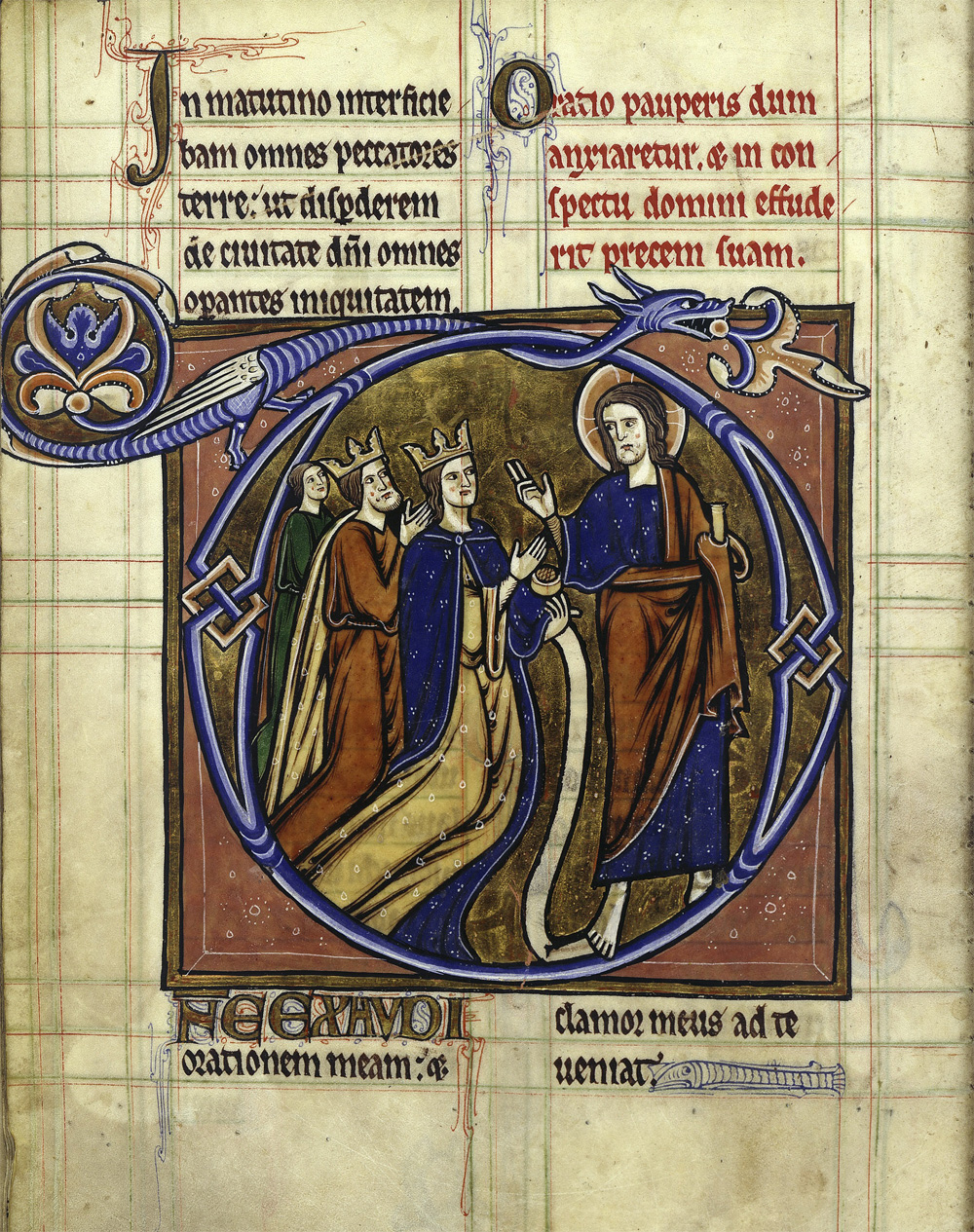
Haakon, Margrete and Haakon the Young, as seen in a psalter owned by Margrete.

Haakon had two illegitimate children with his mistress Kanga the Young (who is only known by name), before 1225. They were:

- Sigurd (died 1252).
- Cecilia (died 1248). Married lendmann Gregorius Andresson, a nephew of the last Bagler king Philip Simonsson in 1241. Widowed in 1246, she married Harald Olafsson, King of Mann and the Isles in 1248. They both drowned the same year on the return voyage to Great Britain.

Haakon married Margrete Skulesdatter on 25 May 1225, daughter of his rival Earl Skule Bårdsson. Their children were:

1. Olav (born 1226). Died in infancy.
2. Haakon the Young (1232–1257). Married Rikissa Birgersdotter, daughter of the Swedish statesman Earl Birger in 1251. Appointed king and co-ruler by his father in 1240, but predeceased his father.
3. Christina (1234–1262). Married Infante Philip of Castile, brother of Alfonso X of Castile in 1258. Died childless.
4. Magnus VI of Norway (1238–1280). Married Ingeborg, daughter of Eric IV of Denmark in 1261. Appointed king and co-ruler after the death of Haakon the Young. Succeeded his father as King of Norway.

== Popular culture ==
Håkon and Kristin were the mascots of the 1994 Winter Olympics. Håkon is named after Haakon IV of Norway and Kristin after Christina of Norway.

In The Last King (2016), the infant Håkon IV is portrayed by Jonathan Oskar Dahlgren.

== See also ==
- White bear of Henry III

== Bibliography ==
- Bagge, Sverre (1996). From Gang Leader to the Lord's Anointed: Kingship in Sverris saga and Hakonar saga Hakonarsonar. The Viking Collection: Studies in Northern civilization. Vol. 8. Odense University. ISBN 8778381088. ISSN 0108-8408.
- Bandlien, Bjørn (2016). "Norway, Sweden, and Novgorod Scandinavian Perceptions of the Russians, Late Twelfth – Early Fourteenth Centuries". Imagined Communities on the Baltic Rim: From the Eleventh to Fifteenth Centuries. Amsterdam University Press. pp. 331–352. doi:10.2307/j.ctt1zxsk8q.16. ISBN 978-90-8964-983-6.
- Barrow, G. W. S. (1981). Kingship and Unity: Scotland 1000-1306. Edinburgh University. ISBN 9780748601042.
- Derry, T. K. (2000). A history of Scandinavia: Norway, Sweden, Denmark, Finland, and Iceland. University of Minnesota. ISBN 9780816637997.
- Forte, Angelo; Oram, Richard D.; Pedersen, Frederik (2005). Viking Empires. Cambridge University. ISBN 9780521829922.
- Fry, Plantagenet Somerset; Fry, Fiona Somerset (1991). A History of Ireland. Routledge. ISBN 9780415048880.
- Helle, Knut (1995). Under kirke og kongemakt: 1130-1350 [Under church and royal power: 1130-1350]. Aschehougs Norgeshistorie (in Norwegian). Vol. 3. Aschehoug. ISBN 8203220312.
- Keyser, Rudolf (1870). Norges historie. Vol. 2. Christiania (Oslo): P. T. Malling.
- Lewis, Suzanne (1987). The art of Matthew Paris in the Chronica majora. University of California. ISBN 9780520049819.
- Lydon, James F. (1998). The Making of Ireland: From Ancient Times to the Present. Routledge. ISBN 9780415013482.
- Line, Philip (2007). Kingship and state formation in Sweden, 1130-1290. BRILL. ISBN 9789004155787.
- O'Callaghan, Joseph F. (1993). "The Norwegian Alliance". The Learned King: The Reign of Alfonso X of Castile. University of Pennsylvania. pp. 202–204.
- O'Callaghan, Joseph F. (2011). The Gibraltar Crusade: Castile and the Battle for the Strait. University of Pennsylvania. ISBN 9780812243024.
- Orfield, Lester B.; Boyer, Benjamin F. (2002) [First published 1953]. The Growth of Scandinavian Law. The Lawbook Exchange. ISBN 9781584771807.

Haakon Haakonsson House of Sverre Cadet branch of the Fairhair dynasty Born: 1204 Died: 16 December 1263
Regnal titles
Preceded by Inge II	King of Norway; 1217–1263 with Haakon the Young (1240–1257); Magnus VI (1257–1263)	Succeeded by Magnus VI
