= Folkenborg =

Folkenborg (sometimes known as Folkinsberg) is a former nobles estate from the 12th-13th century located one mile southeast of Mysen located in Østfold. It is famous for being the site where King Haakon IV of Norway was born. In 1225 Haakon stayed here during his war with Värmland which means that it was either a royal property or his own personal property. Since most of the royal property was inherited by Skule Bårdsson it is likely to have been a Patrimony probably from his mother Inga. Despite some spellings as -berg the proper spelling is -borg because berg would imply a mountain but there is none on the site. Instead it is more likely that there was a Borough (Borg) which could range from a walled settlement to a fortified house. Folkenborg is referred to as a "homestead" and was thus probably a fortified manor house.

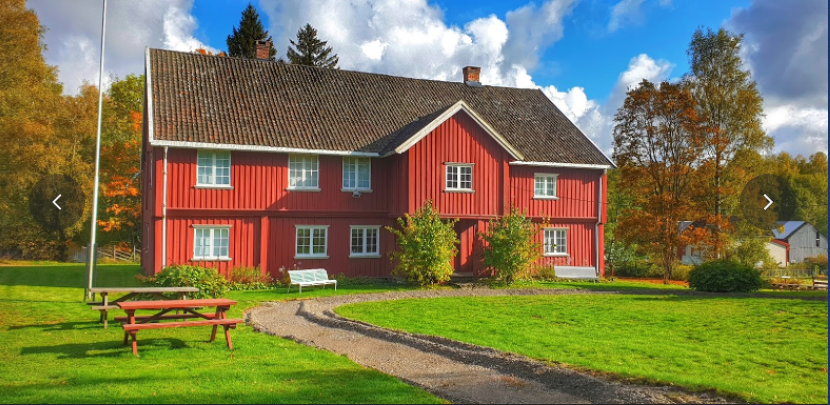
Today there is a museum on the site of the former manor.
