= Battle of Florvåg =

1194 Norwegian naval battle

- Part of the Civil war era in Norway
Date	3 April 1194
Location	Florvåg, Askøy, Hordaland
Result	Decisive Birkebeiner victory

Belligerents
Birkebeiner party	Eyjarskeggjar party (supported by Jarldom of Orkney)

Commanders and leaders
Sverre Sigurdsson; Bård Guttormsson †	Sigurd Magnusson †; Hallkjell Jonsson †; Olav Jarlsmåg †

Strength
21 ships 2,000 men	14 ships 2,000 men

Casualties and losses
900–1,000 killed	12 ships lost 1,000–1,500 killed

The Battle of Florvåg (Norwegian: Slaget ved Florvåg) was a naval battle that was fought on 3 April 1194 between King Sverre Sigurdsson, leader of the Birkebeiner party, and Sigurd Magnusson, the Eyjarskeggjar party pretender. Although there had been previous revolts during Sverre's reign following his usurpation of the throne in 1184, the revolt in support of Sigurd Magnusson (son of former king Magnus Erlingsson) became far more threatening than the attempts of previous pretenders. In a larger context, the battle was part of the century-long civil war era in Norway.

As Sigurd was a minor, the actual leaders behind the revolt were Hallkjell Jonsson and Olav Jarlsmåg. The Eyjarskeggjars recruited their initial army in Orkney and Shetland (hence their name, meaning "island-men"), returned to Norway in 1193, and quickly took control over a large part of the country. Based in Bergen for the winter, the Eyjarskeggjar fleet relocated to the nearby bay of Florvåg off Askøy in anticipation of the arrival of Sverre's Birkebeiner fleet from Niðaros (Trondheim). The battle began with a surprise attack by the Birkebeiners during night. Although the Eyjarskeggjars gained the upper hand for most of the battle and victory eventually seemed within reach, their ships were caught in a current during the final stages of the battle. This caused them to become easy prey for the Birkebeiner, who in the end won the battle decisively and extinguished the majority of the Eyjarskeggjar army, including their leaders.

== Background ==
The main source for the battle, and the events leading up to it, is King Sverre's own Sverris saga. Sverre had usurped the throne from the previous king Magnus Erlingsson following the Birkebeiner victory at the Battle of Fimreite in 1184. In the years after this there were a succession of revolts started against Sverre, in support of various pretenders. Almost ten years after Sverre's usurpation, a revolt that would prove far more precarious for Sverre was started, based around Sigurd Magnusson, the only widely recognised son of Magnus Erlingsson. Since Sigurd was a minor, the group supporting his claim to the throne was led by Sigurd's guardian, lendmann Hallkjell Jonsson, along with Olav Jarlsmåg and Sigurd Jarlsson. The saga also claims that Bishop Nicholas Arnesson was involved with the revolt, but this is disputed by modern historians. Sigurd Magnusson was sent westwards to Norðreyjar in 1192, and gained the military support of the Jarl Harald Maddadsson who provided the rebels with a longship. Sigurd was proclaimed king of Norway in Orkney, and was permitted to recruit an army in Harald's realm.

The army sailed to Viken (the south-eastern part of Norway) in 1193 with 23 ships and 2,000 men, and had Sigurd proclaimed king at the Haugating. This force was commonly called the Eyjarskeggjars, meaning the "island-men", although they themselves preferred to be called the Gullbeiner ("gold-legs"), as opposed to their opponents, the Birkebeiner ("birch-legs"). The Eyjarskeggjars sailed for a brief raid for booty in Denmark, and after returning to Norway, they took control over the entire country south of Stad—thus most of Western, Southern and Eastern Norway. Sigurd and the Eyjarskeggjars took up their base in Bergen for the winter, although they failed to take the city castle Sverresborg which was defended by 300 loyal Birkebeiners. Not expecting a Birkebeiner attack until spring, the Eyjarskeggjar army was distributed across the country. The fleet was also divided up, with six ships stationed under Sigurd Jarlsson's command in Stavanger, and three in Sogn.

== Battle ==
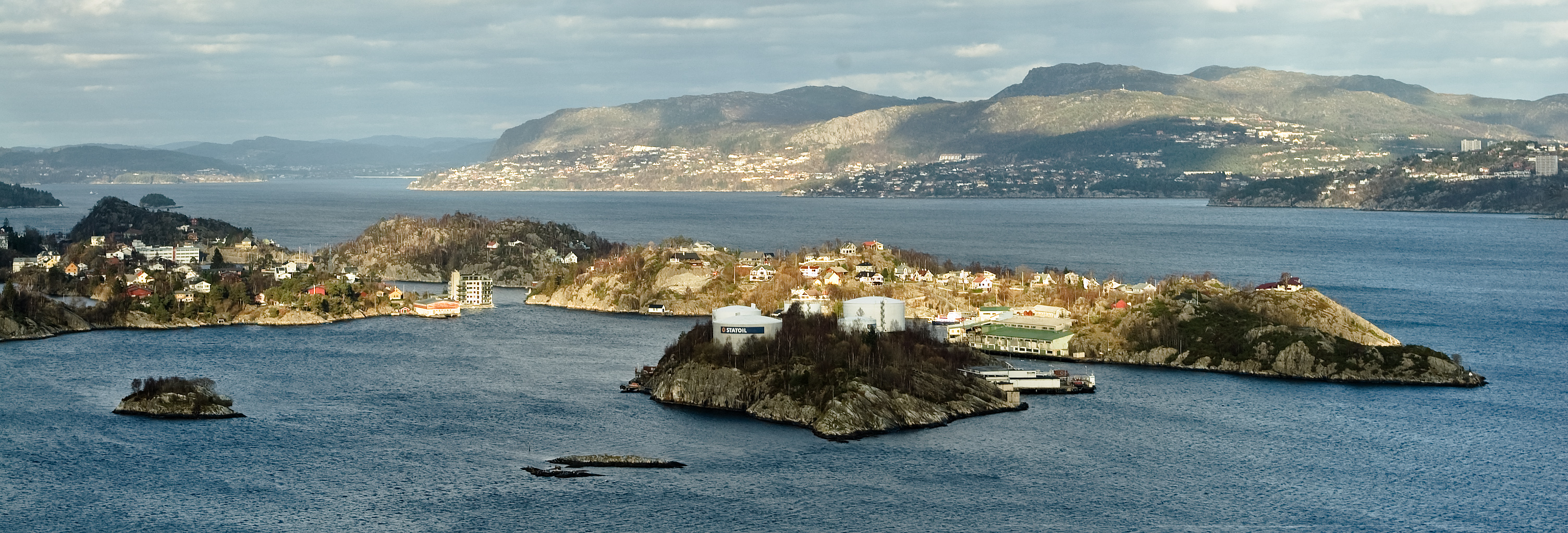
Eastwards-facing photo showing the isles around Florvåg, with the northern parts of Bergen in the background to the right. Florvåg and Askøy is separated from Bergen by Byfjorden.

After hearing news of the Eyjarskeggjar offence, Sverre gathered his troops and sailed south from his base in Nidaros (Trondheim) with 20 ships. When Sverre was closing in on Bergen on 2 April, the Eyjas rskeggjarwent to their ships and sailed across Byfjorden to the bay of Florvåg, off the southeastern side of the island Askøy. Sverre arrived in the evening and left his fleet in Gravdal. After gaining intelligence of Eyjarskeggjar plans of a counter-attack, Sverre set out to surprise the Eyjarskeggjars with an attack before dawn.

The Birkebeiner fleet approached Florvåg in early 3 April, Palm Sunday, while it was still dark. The Eyjarskeggjars did not know of the attack until they heard the noise from the Birkebeiner ships crushing into their own ships. As the Birkebeiner warriors guarded themselves with their shields, the Eyjarskeggjar found no targets to shoot at until the Birkebeiner finally charged at the Eyjarskeggjars. The Eyjarskeggjars had an advantage since their ships were taller than those of the Birkebeiner, and they managed to pull Sverre's own royal ship towards them, killing all the archers and capturing the royal banner Sigerflua.

After heavy losses on both sides, the Birkebeiner managed to shake off the Eyjarskeggjar fleet and started a retreat. The Eyjarskeggjars began chasing the Birkebeiner, but since their oars had been broken, the Eyjarskeggjar ships were suddenly dragged into a strong current, and the Birkebeiner fleet returned to attack the ships of the Eyjarskeggjars. The Birkebeiner also gained reinforcements of a fresh ship with 100 men from Sverresborg, and easily defeated the Eyjarskeggjars, one ship at a time. Only two Eyjarskeggjar ships managed to get away, and except for some men who requested pardoning, the majority of the Eyjarskeggjar forces were killed, including Sigurd Magnusson, Hallkjell Jonsson, and Olav Jarlsmåg.

== Numbers ==
According to the saga, the Birkebeiner fleet consisted of 20 ships, plus a ship from Sverresborg that joined later on during the final stages of the battle. The Eyjarskeggjars had a numerically smaller fleet of 14 ships available during the battle, but compensated this by having ships that were larger in size. Historian Halvdan Koht estimated both fleets to carry total forces of approximately 2,000 men: this was later supported by historian Anders Bjarne Fossen. Koht estimated the Eyjarskeggjar casualties at 1,000 men, but Fossen raised that number to 1,500. While harder to pinpoint, Fossen estimated the numbers of Birkebeiners killed in the battle at around 900–1,000 men. These numbers makes the Battle of Florvåg possibly the deadliest naval battle fought in Norwegian history.

== Aftermath ==
Sverre became the undisputed ruler of Norway after the victory at Florvåg, and was at the height of his power during the following years. On 29 June, Sverre had himself crowned in Bergen by the bishops in Norway, all except one installed by Sverre and thus loyal to his rule. As the king was an excommunicated priest, his coronation was prohibited by the Catholic Church and served as the catalyst to a new struggle of his, this time with the Pope. The only bishop who opposed the coronation, in line with the Church's policy, was Nicholas Arnesson, whom Sverris saga accuses of being behind the Eyjarskeggjar revolt, a claim that is considered unsubstantiated by modern historians.

In 1195, after learning that Sverre planned to subdue Norðreyjar, Jarl Harald Maddadsson who had supported the Eyjarskeggjar revolt went as quickly as he could to meet Sverre in Bergen. He then pleaded his innocence and apologised to Sverre, claiming that he had not allowed the Eyjarskeggjars to raise an army in his realm. Sverre settled with Harald by asserting his overlordship and taxation rights over Norðreyjar, and permanently detaching Shetland from it; the Jarl, and the Jarl's successors, were to rule over Orkney (including Caithness) only.

=== Vinje runic inscriptions ===
Most of the Eyjarskeggjars who managed to escape fled to Denmark. Sigurd Jarlsson, a surviving Eyjarskeggjar leader, was in Bergen during the battle although he did not take part himself, and fled to Telemark when he received news of the defeat. The detour to Telemark before he later arrived in Denmark is known from two runic inscriptions that were discovered in the Vinje stave church when it was demolished in 1796, one of them having been written by Sigurd himself.

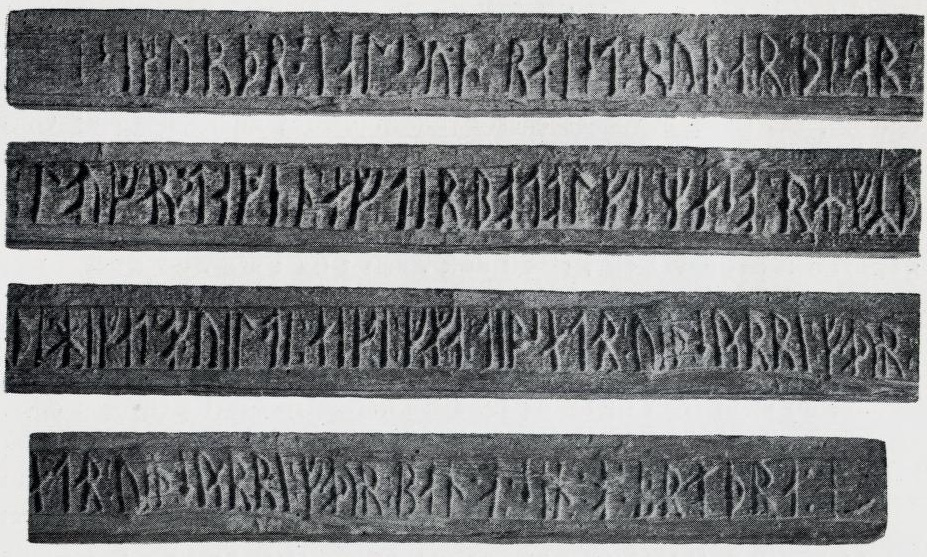
Sigurd Jarlsson's runic inscription in Vinje.

Latin transliteration:

sigurþr ialssun ræist runar þesar lougar dagen eftir botolfs mæso er an flyþi higat ok uildi æigi gaga til sætar uiþ suærri foþur bana sin ok brøþra

Old Norse transcription:

Sigurðr Jarlssun reist runar þessar laugardaginn eptir Bótolfsmessu, er hann flýdi hingat ok vildi eigi ganga til sættar við Sverri, föðurbana sinn ok braðra.

English translation:

Sigurd Jarlsson carved these runes the Saturday after Botulfs' Mass [17 June], as he had fled here and did not want to settle with Sverre, the bane of his father and brothers.

The other runic inscription found in the stave church was written by one Halvard Grenske (possibly identical with Halvard Bratte), who had actually taken part in the Battle of Florvåg. His inscription is written in verses, cursing those who commit betrayal as well as promising the continued struggle of the enemies of Sverre.

== Sources ==
- Fossen, Anders Bjarne (1999). Askøys historie: Fra de eldste tider til 1870 (in Norwegian). Vol. 1. Kleppestø: Askøy kommune. ISBN 82-99-41-05-1-7.
- Koht, Halvdan (1952). Kong Sverre (in Norwegian). Oslo: Aschehoug.
- Lunden, Kåre (1976). Norge under Sverreætten, 1177–1319 høymiddelalder. Norges historie: høymiddelalder (in Norwegian). Vol. 3. Cappelen. ISBN 82-02-03425-6.
- Olsen, Magnus (1951). Norges innskrifter med de yngre runer: V. Buskerud fylke; VI. Vestfold fylke; VII. Telemark fylke (in Norwegian). Vol. 2. Oslo: Norsk historisk kjeldeskrift-institutt.
