= Cecilia Sigurdsdotter =

Cecilia Sigurdsdatter (1155-1186) was an illegitimate daughter of king Sigurd II of Norway and the mother of King Inge II of Norway. She married the Swedish Folkvid the Lawspeaker in 1177 but abandoned him to marry the Norwegian Birkebeiner Bård Guttormsson in 1184 for politically motivated reasons. She is known for the lawsuits she faced to avoid having her second marriage declared void since her first spouse was still alive. Cecilia's ability to forsake her marriage to Folkvid provides important light on contemporary marriage law in Norway.

Cecilia had at least two sons: with Folkvid, Haakon Galen, and Inge with Bård. She died not long after Inge's birth. Haakon would later become one of Inge's rivals for the throne of Norway during the later stages of the civil war period.
