= Folkvid the Lawspeaker =

Swedish lawspeaker

Folkvid was the lawspeaker of Värmland during the second half of the 12th century. He was the father of Håkon Galen, an earl whose son Knut Håkonsson was a claimant for the Norwegian throne.

Folkvid is only known from the Bagler sagas, where he is mentioned by virtue of his marriage to Cecilia Sigurdsdotter, an illegitimate daughter of Norwegian king Sigurd Munn. The forced marriage was arranged by the earl Erling Skakke. It was annulled in 1184 by the archbishop of Nidaros, on the initiative of Cecilia's half-brother, King Sverre I of Norway. Most Swedish historians have questioned the historical existence of Folkvid, due to lack of reference in Swedish sources from the time.
