= Haakon III =

King of Norway from 1202 to 1204

Haakon III Sverresson

King of Norway
- Reign: 9 March 1202 – 1 January 1204
- Predecessor: Sverre
- Successor: Guttorm
- Born: 1183
- Died: 1 January 1204 (20–21)
- Burial: Old Cathedral, Bergen (destroyed in 1531)
- Issue: Haakon IV of Norway
- House: Sverre
- Father: Sverre of Norway
- Mother: Uncertain

Haakon III Sverresson (Norwegian: Håkon Sverresson; Old Norse: Hákon Sverrisson; c. 1183 – 1 January 1204) was King of Norway from 1202 to 1204.

== Biography ==
Haakon was born as the second illegitimate son of the future King Sverre, then a Faroese adventurer. Historian P. A. Munch suggested that Haakon III's mother could have been Astrid Roesdatter, daughter of Bishop Roe in the Faroe Islands, but this has not been supported by later historians.

The civil war period of Norwegian history lasted from 1130 to 1240. During this period there were several interlocked conflicts of varying scale and intensity. The background for these conflicts were the unclear Norwegian succession laws, social conditions and the struggle between different aristocratic parties and between Church and King. There were then two main parties, firstly known by varying names or no names at all, but finally condensed into the parties of Bagler and Birkebeiner. The rallying point regularly was a royal son, who was set up as the leader of the party in question, to oppose the rule of king from the contesting party. Sverre and Håkon were leaders of the Birkebeiner party.

Håkon is first mentioned as one of the leaders of his father's armies in a battle against the Bagler in Oslo in 1197. Subsequently, he is mentioned several times as taking part in his father's wars against the Bagler. On his deathbed his father, who died on 9 March 1202, declared that he had no other son alive than Håkon. He also wrote a letter to Håkon advising him to settle the longstanding dispute with the church. When the news of Sverre's death reached Håkon and the Birkebeiner assembled in Nidaros, Håkon was first taken as chieftain by the Birkebeiner. The same spring he was taken as king at the thing in Nidaros.

The same spring the Norwegian bishops, who had been in exile in Sweden and Denmark and had supported the Bagler, returned to Norway and made a settlement with Håkon. It seems likely that he gave in to most of their demands. Norway was released from the interdict it had been placed under during the reign of Sverre. Håkon is said to have been on friendly terms with the farmers and the common people, and the Bagler party soon lost much of its support. In the autumn of 1202, the Bagler king Inge Magnusson was killed by the local farmers of Oppland and the Bagler party in Norway was dissolved. A new Bagler pretender, Erling Steinvegg, soon appeared in Denmark, but declined to renew the fighting, as he saw little chance of succeeding against Håkon. Håkon was thus the undisputed ruler of the country.

Håkon appears to have had a troubled relationship with his father's queen, Margareta Eriksdotter. After Sverre's death, Margareta attempted to return to her native Sweden with her daughter by Sverre, Kristina. Håkon's men forcibly separated her from her daughter, as he wanted to keep her at his court. Subsequently, Margareta seemingly settled with Håkon and went to his court. During Christmas in 1203, Håkon fell ill after a bloodletting, and on 1 January 1204 he died. His death was suspected as poisoning and his stepmother Margareta was suspected of the crime. In the end she had one of her men undergo a trial by ordeal on her behalf to prove her innocence, but the man was badly burned. This was taken as proof of her guilt, and she had to flee back to Sweden.

Håkon Sverresson was not married, and at his death no heirs were known. He was therefore succeeded by his 4-year-old nephew Guttorm Sigurdsson. But after his death a woman, Inga Olafsdatter of Varteig, whom Håkon had taken as a mistress for a time in 1203, appeared at the Birkebeiner court with an infant son who she claimed was Håkon's son. The child had been born in present-day Østfold after the death of the putative father. The boy, named Håkon after his father, later became King Håkon IV. In the summer of 1218, Inga underwent a successful trial by ordeal (bore iron) in Bergen to show the paternity of her son.

During Håkon's brief reign, he managed to release Norway from the church's interdict, and end the civil wars, at least for a time. Whether the peace would have lasted if he had been allowed to live is impossible to say. As it turned out, his early death sparked a renewal of the fighting, as the bagler pretender Erling Steinvegg in a matter of months gathered an army and went to Norway to claim the throne.

Håkon was buried in the Christ Church in Bergen. The church was demolished in 1531, and the site is today marked by a memorial.

Our main sources to Håkon's life are Sverris saga and the Bagler sagas, both written shortly after the events, in the 13th century.

In The Last King (2016), Benjamin Helstad plays the character listed as "King", who is the infant Håkon IV's father.

== Bibliography ==
- Karl Jónsson; translator J. Stephton. The Saga of King Sverri of Norway. Llanerch Press. ISBN 1-897853-49-1
- Sturla Þórðarson; translation to English by G.W. Dasent (1894, repr. 1964). The Saga of Hakon and a Fragment of the Saga of Magnus with Appendices. London (Rerum Britannicarum Medii Ævi Scriptores, vol.88.4).
- Finn Hødnebø & Hallvard Magerøy (eds.); translator Gunnar Pedersen; (1979). Soga om baglarar og birkebeinar (Noregs kongesoger 3). Det Norske Samlaget, Oslo. ISBN 82-521-0891-1 (in Norwegian)

Haakon Sverresson House of Sverre Cadet branch of the Fairhair dynasty Born: 1170s Died: 1 January 1204
Regnal titles
Preceded by Sverre Sigurdsson	King of Norway; 1202–1204	Succeeded by Guttorm Sigurdsson
