= Christina of Norway =

Norwegian princess (c.1190s–1213)

- Born: circa 1190s (unknown)
- Died: 1213; Norway
- Spouse: Philip Simonsson
- House: Sverre
- Father: Sverre Sigurdsson
- Mother: Margaret of Sweden

Christina Sverresdatter (Norwegian: Kristin Sverresdatter; died 1213) was a medieval Norwegian princess and titular queen consort, spouse of co-regent Philip Simonsson, the Bagler party pretender to the throne of Norway.

== Biography ==
Christina was the daughter of King Sverre Sigurdsson of Norway and his Swedish queen consort, Margaret. Her father died in 1202 and her mother returned to Sweden, forced to leave Christina behind. In 1209, she married Norwegian aristocrat Philip Simonsson. She died in labour giving birth to their first child, a son, who also died soon after.

Her marriage was arranged as a part of reconciliation between the Bagler and Birkebeiner factions during the period of the civil war era in Norway. In 1208, with no side looking able to achieve victory, Bishop Nikolas Arnesson together with other bishops of the Church, brokered a peace deal between the Baglers and the Birkebeiners. At the settlement of Kvitsøy, the Birkebeiner candidate for king, Inge II of Norway, recognized Philip's rule over the eastern third of the country in return for Philip giving up any claim to the title of king and recognizing King Inge as his overlord. To seal the agreement, Philip was to marry King Sverre's daughter, Christina.

== Legacy ==
Håkon and Kristin were the mascots of the 1994 Winter Olympics. Håkon is named after Haakon IV of Norway and Kristin after Christina of Norway.
