= Sigurd Magnusson =

Norwegian nobleman (1180–1194)

Sigurd Magnusson (c. 1180 – 3 April 1194) was a Norwegian nobleman who campaigned against King Sverre of Norway during the Civil war era in Norway.

== Background ==
Sigurd Magnusson was the son of King Magnus Erlingsson and Gyrid Aslaksdatter. Sigurd Magnusson was the only publicly acknowledged son of King Magnus. Several years of warfare with Sverre Sigurdsson had ended with the defeat and death of King Magnus in the Battle of Fimreite (Slaget ved Fimreite) in 1184. In the aftermath, groups made up principally of the Norwegian aristocracy, clergy and merchants were formed to depose King Sverre.

The young Sigurd was proclaimed to be King of Norway in 1193 at the Haugating near Tønsberg. As the son of Magnus Erlingsson, Sigurd was the nominal king supported by the so-called Isle Beards (Eyjarskeggjar) from Shetland and Orkney. The real leader was Hallkjell Jonsson, who had been a son-in-law of Erling Skakke as well as the brother-in-law of King Magnus. With Harald Maddadsson, Earl of Orkney and Mormaer of Caithness, Hallkjell gathered most of his men on Orkney and Shetland. After establishing themselves in Viken, the Eyjarskeggjar sailed on to Bergen. Although they occupied the city itself and the surrounding regions, a force of Birkebeiners held on in the fortress of Sverresborg.

== Battle of Florvåg ==
In the spring of 1194, King Sverre sailed south to confront the Eyjarskeggjar. The two fleets met at Florvåg on Askøy, an island just north of Bergen. King Sverre and his force confronted Sigurd Magnusson and the Eyjarskeggjars. King Sverre came to Gravdal with a vast fleet, which rowed over to Florvågøya. On the morning of Palm Sunday, 3 April 1194 the battle took place. Here the battle experience of the Birkebeiner veterans proved to be decisive. Hallkjell Jonsson fell with most of his men, including Sigurd Magnusson. King Sverre won, but around 2,500 soldiers were killed in the bloody battle.

Sigurd Magnusson's corpse was shown in Bergen, in order to demonstrate King Sverre's power and also to prevent any impostors claiming to be the young prince. His body was buried in Mariakyrkjegarden, the churchyard of the St Mary's Church in Bergen.

== Historic context ==
The civil wars period of Norwegian history lasted from 1130 to 1240. During this period there were several interlocked conflicts of varying scale and intensity. The background for these conflicts was the unclear Norwegian succession laws, social conditions and the struggle between Church and king. There were then two main parties, firstly known by varying names or no names at all, but finally condensed into parties of Bagler and Birkebeiner. The rallying point regularly was a royal son, who was set up as the head figure of the party in question, to oppose the rule of the king from the contesting party.

== Sources ==
The most important historical source on the life of Sigurd Magnusson is contained in the Sverris Saga. This saga is likely biased, since the foreword states that part was written under King Sverre's direct sponsorship. Heimskringla, written ca. 1230 by the poet and historian Snorri Sturluson, contains background information.

== Other sources ==
- McDonald, R. Andrew The Kingdom of the Isles: Scotland's Western Seaboard, c. 1100–c. 1336 (Tuckwell, West Linton, 1997)
- Lidén, Hans-Emil Mariakirken i Bergen (Bergen: Mangschou. 2000)

Preceded by Jon Kuvlung	Viken-party pretender to the Norwegian throne	Succeeded by Inge Magnusson (Bagler party)
