= Eyjarskeggjar =

Norse rebel group

The Eyjarskeggjar (in modern Norwegian: Øyskjeggene) were a Norse rebel group during the Norwegian Civil War that supported the claim of Sigurd Magnusson to the throne.

In the spring of 1193, Harald Maddadsson, Jarl of Orkney approved the banding together of men from Orkney and Shetland to oppose the rule of King Sverre Sigurdsson. The name eyjarskeggjar means "island beards," reflecting their origin in the Northern Isles. The leaders of the Eyjarskeggjar were Hallkjell Jonsson, who was married to Ragnhild, daughter of Erling Skakke; Harald's brother-in-law Olav Jarlsmåg; and Olav's foster-son Sigurd, the teenaged son of King Magnus V. By summer, Sigurd's supporters had captured Viken, and in autumn, Sigurd's uncle, Sigurd Jarlsson, joined the Eyjarskeggjar.

The Eyjarskeggjar confronted Sverre and his Birkebeiner supporters at the Battle of Florvåg in April 1194 and were decisively defeated. Sigurd, Olav, and Hallkjell were all killed, effectively ending opposition to Sverre. Harald travelled to Bergen to disavow the Eyjarskeggjar, which allowed him to remain Jarl of Orkney and Caithness, although Sverre removed Shetland from his jarldom.
