= Bagler sagas =

The Bagler Sagas (Old Norse Böglunga sögur) are kings' sagas relating to events which occurred between 1202–17 and are a primary source of Norwegian history during this period. There are two versions, one shorter and one longer, which are in modern editions usually printed as one saga. The authors of both versions are unknown. There are indications that both of them were Icelanders, although this cannot be said for certain.

The Bagler Sagas occur during the Civil war era in Norway. The sagas deal with the reigns of the birkebeiner kings Haakon Sverresson, Guttorm Sigurdsson and Inge Baardsson, and the bagler pretenders to the Norwegian throne Erling Steinvegg and Philippus Simonsson.

The sagas pick up the story where Sverris saga leaves off, at the death of King Sverre in 1202. The older, and shorter, version ends with the wedding of Philippus in 1209. The later and longer version, also continues the story until the death of King Inge in 1217. The older version is neutral in its depiction of events, without a clear bias for either birkebeiner or bagler. It was probably written not long after the point where it leaves off, in 1209. The newer version was probably written by someone who wanted to expand the older version with more material about the birkebeiner, and continue the story to cover all of Inge's reign. It was probably written no later than the early 1220s. The author of this later version is clearly on the side of the birkebeiner, and shows personal sympathies for King Inge, also in his disputes with his brother, earl Haakon the Crazy (Håkon Galen).

== Other sources ==
- Soga om baglarar og birkebeinar translated by Gunnar Pederse (Oslo: Samlaget, 1979)
- Böglunga saga (styttri gerð) translated by Einarr Michaelsson (Reykjavík: Skemman, 2015)
