= Haugating =

Governing assembly in medieval Norway

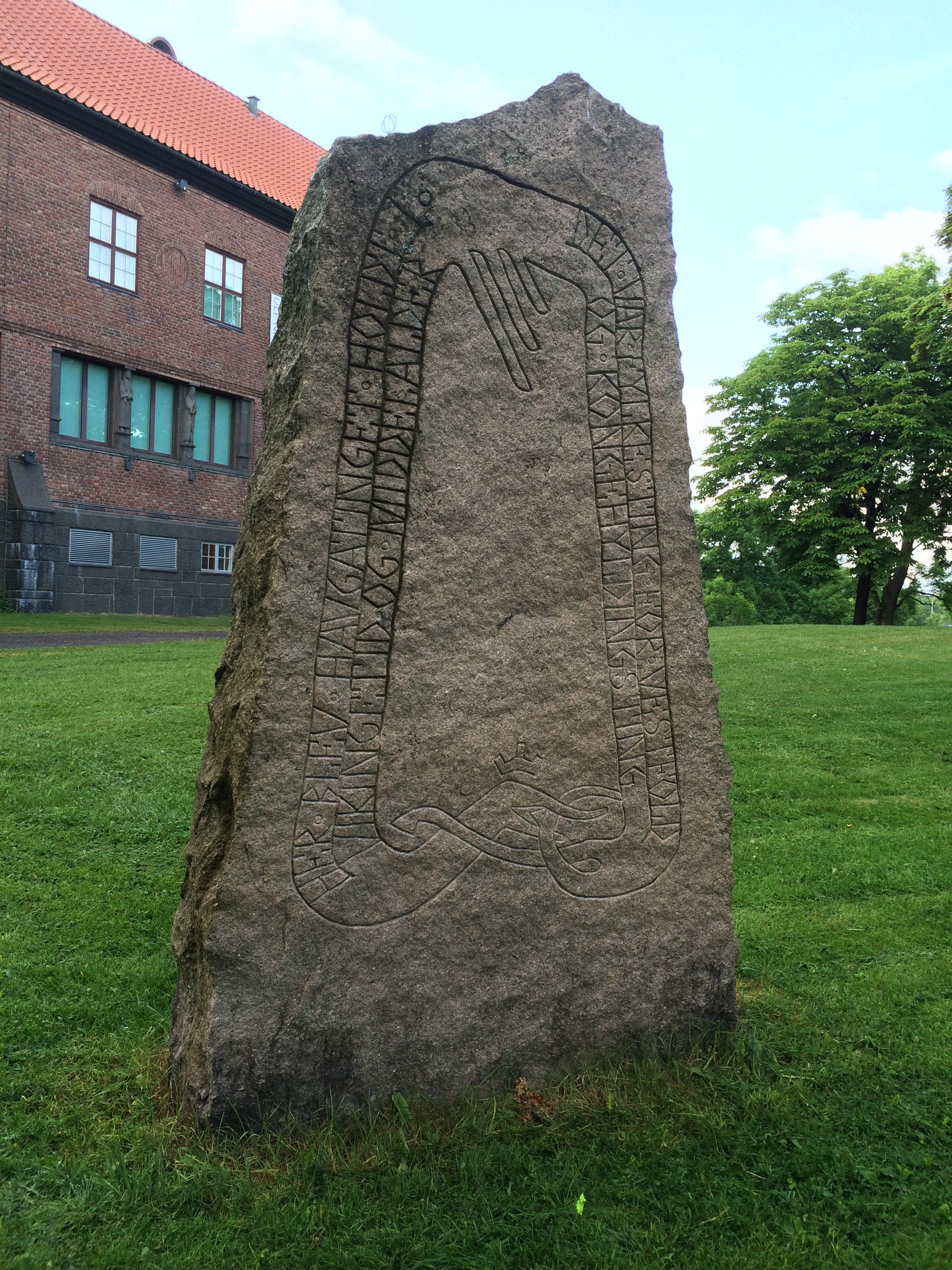
Memorial stone commemorating Haugating at Haugar Vestfold Kunstmuseum in Tønsberg

Haugating was a Thing in medieval Norway. Haugating served as an assembly for the regions around Vestfold and the area west of Oslofjord. It was located at Tønsberg in Vestfold, Norway.

== Background ==
Although it was not as recognized nationally as the Øreting in Trøndelag, Haugating did play an important role in the history of Norway as a site for the proclamation of kings. At various times, Harald Gille, Sigurd Magnusson, Magnus Erlingsson and Jon Kuvlung were all proclaimed there to be contenders to the throne of Norway.

Haugating was seated in Tønsberg at Haugar (from the Old Norse word haugr meaning hill or burial mound). During the Civil war era in Norway (between 1130 and 1240), Tonsberg was one of the area where the Bagler faction and other rebel bands stood strong in the battle against the Birchleg. Several rebel bands hailed their royal subjects from Haugating. A memorial stone was erected on the site during 1954.

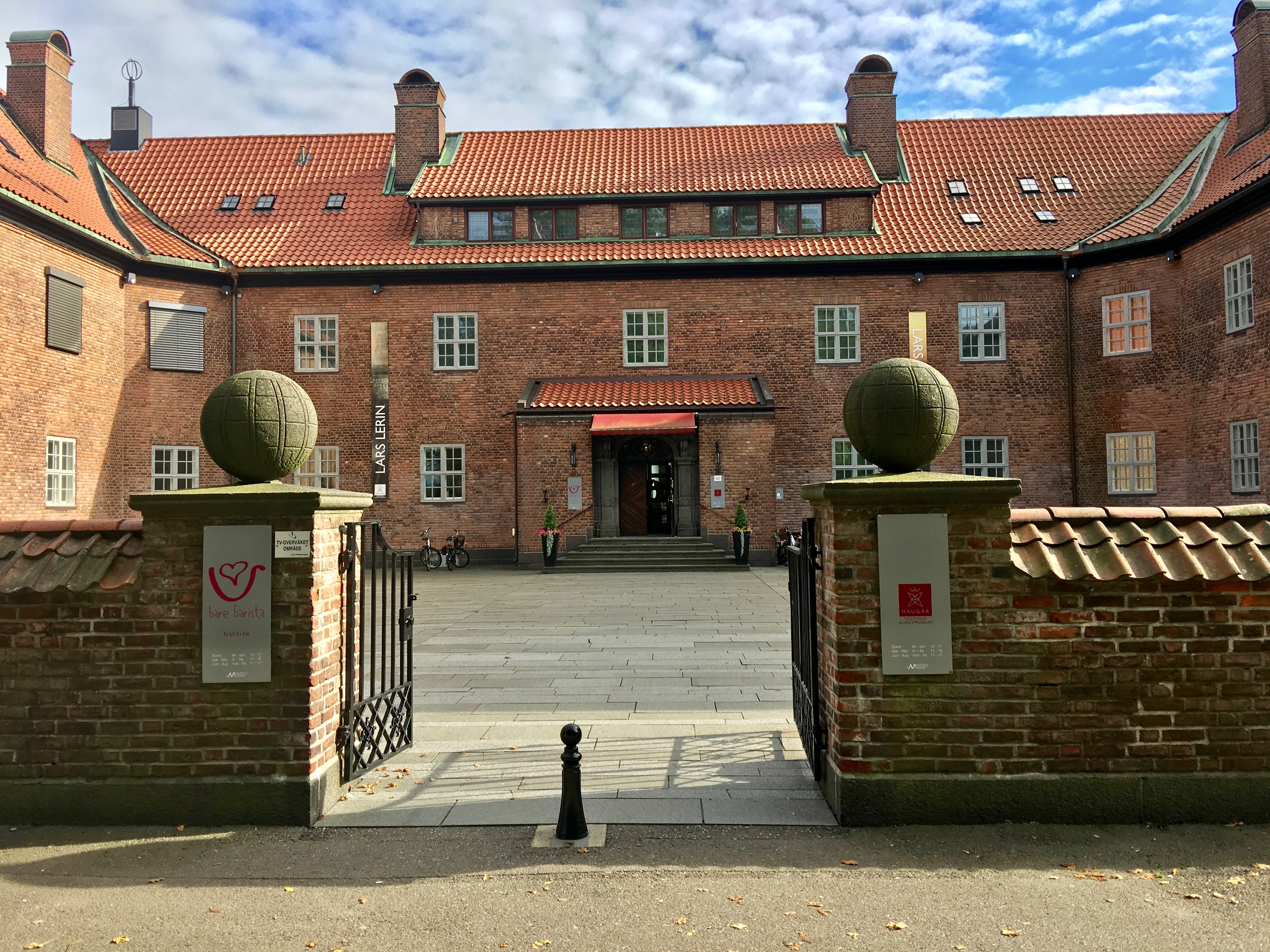
Haugar Vestfold Kunstmuseum

== Haugar Vestfold Kunstmuseum ==
Haugar Vestfold Art Museum (Haugar Vestfold Kunstmuseum) is located at the site of the former Haugating. The museum opened to the public 1995 and since 2009 has been associated with Vestfold Museum (Vestfoldmuseene). This is an art museum with exhibitions principally featuring Norwegian contemporary art. The museum features works by Odd Nerdrum and Frans Widerberg as well as works by Kjartan Slettemark among others. The museum is associated with Vestfold Museum (Vestfoldmuseene).

Haugar Vestfold Art Museum took over the former premises of Tønsberg Navigation School (Tønsberg Navigasjonsskole). The building was built 1918-1921 and designed by architects Andreas Bjercke and Georg Eliassen. Their design was awarded the Houen Foundation Award in 1925. The building is adorned with twelve caryatid which were created by the sculptor Wilhelm Rasmussen between 1920 and 1922.

== Other sources ==
- Orning, Hans Jacob (2008) Unpredictability and Presence: Norwegian Kingship in the High Middle Ages (Leiden: BRILL) ISBN 9789004166615

== Related Reading ==
- Andersen, Per Sveaas (1977) Samlingen av Norge og kristningen av landet : 800–1130 (Oslo: Universitetsforlaget) ISBN 8200024121
