= Warfare in Medieval Scotland =

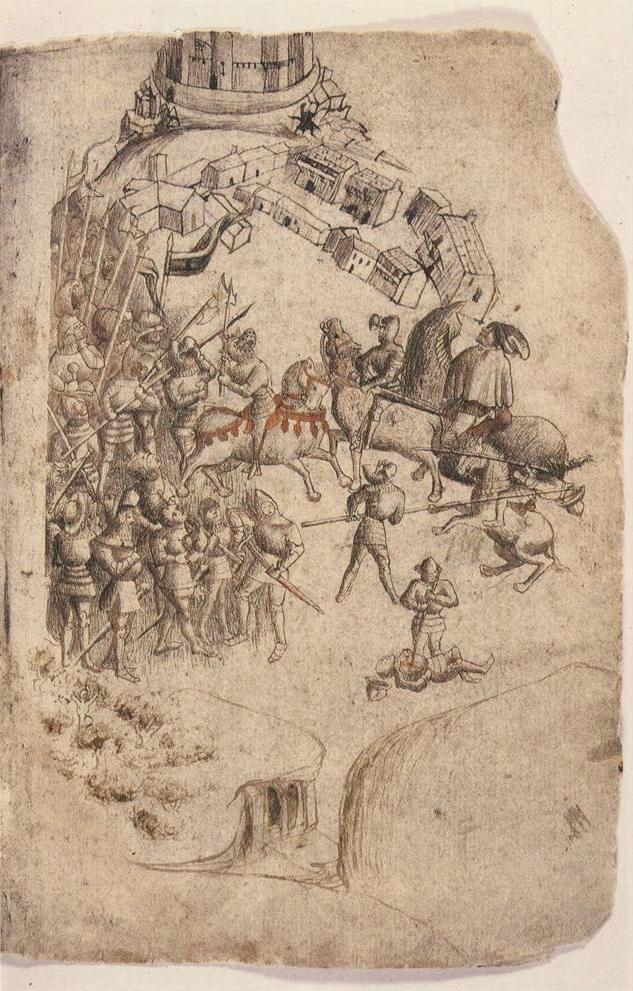
The earliest known depiction of the Battle of Bannockburn in 1314 from a 1440s manuscript of Walter Bower's Scotichronicon

Warfare in Medieval Scotland includes all military activity in the modern borders of Scotland, or by forces originating in the region, between the departure of the Romans in the fifth century and the adoption of the innovations of the Renaissance in the early sixteenth century. In this period conflict developed from minor raids to major conflicts, incorporating many of the innovations of continental warfare.

In the Early Middle Ages war on land was characterised by the use of small war-bands of household troops often engaging in raids and low level warfare. The arrival of the Vikings brought a new scale of naval warfare, with rapid movement based around the Viking longship. The birlinn, which developed from the longship, became a major factor in warfare in the Highlands and Islands. By the High Middle Ages, the kings of Scotland could command forces of tens of thousands of men for short periods as part of the "common army", mainly of poorly armoured spearmen and bowmen. After the "Davidian Revolution" of the twelfth century, which introduced elements of feudalism to Scotland, these forces were augmented by small numbers of mounted and heavily armoured knights. Feudalism also introduced castles into the country, originally simple wooden motte-and-bailey constructions, but these were replaced in the thirteenth century with more formidable stone "enceinte" castles, with high encircling walls. In the thirteenth century the threat of Scandinavian naval power subsided and the kings of Scotland were able to use naval forces to help subdue the Highlands and Islands.

Scottish field armies rarely managed to stand up to the usually larger and more professional armies produced by England, but they were used to good effect by Robert I of Scotland at the Battle of Bannockburn in 1314 to secure Scottish independence. He adopted a policy of slighting castles and made use of naval power to support his forces, beginning to develop a royal Scottish naval force. In the Late Middle Ages under the Stewart kings these forces were further augmented by specialist troops, particularly men-at-arms and archers, hired by bonds of manrent, similar to English indentures of the same period. New "livery and maintenance" castles were built to house these troops and castles began to be adapted to accommodate gunpowder weapons. The Stewarts also adopted major innovations in continental warfare, such as longer pikes, the extensive use of artillery, and they built up a formidable navy. However, one of the best armed and largest Scottish armies ever assembled still met with defeat at the hands of an English army at the Battle of Flodden in 1513, which saw the destruction of a large number of ordinary troops, a large section of the nobility and King James IV.

== Early Middle Ages ==
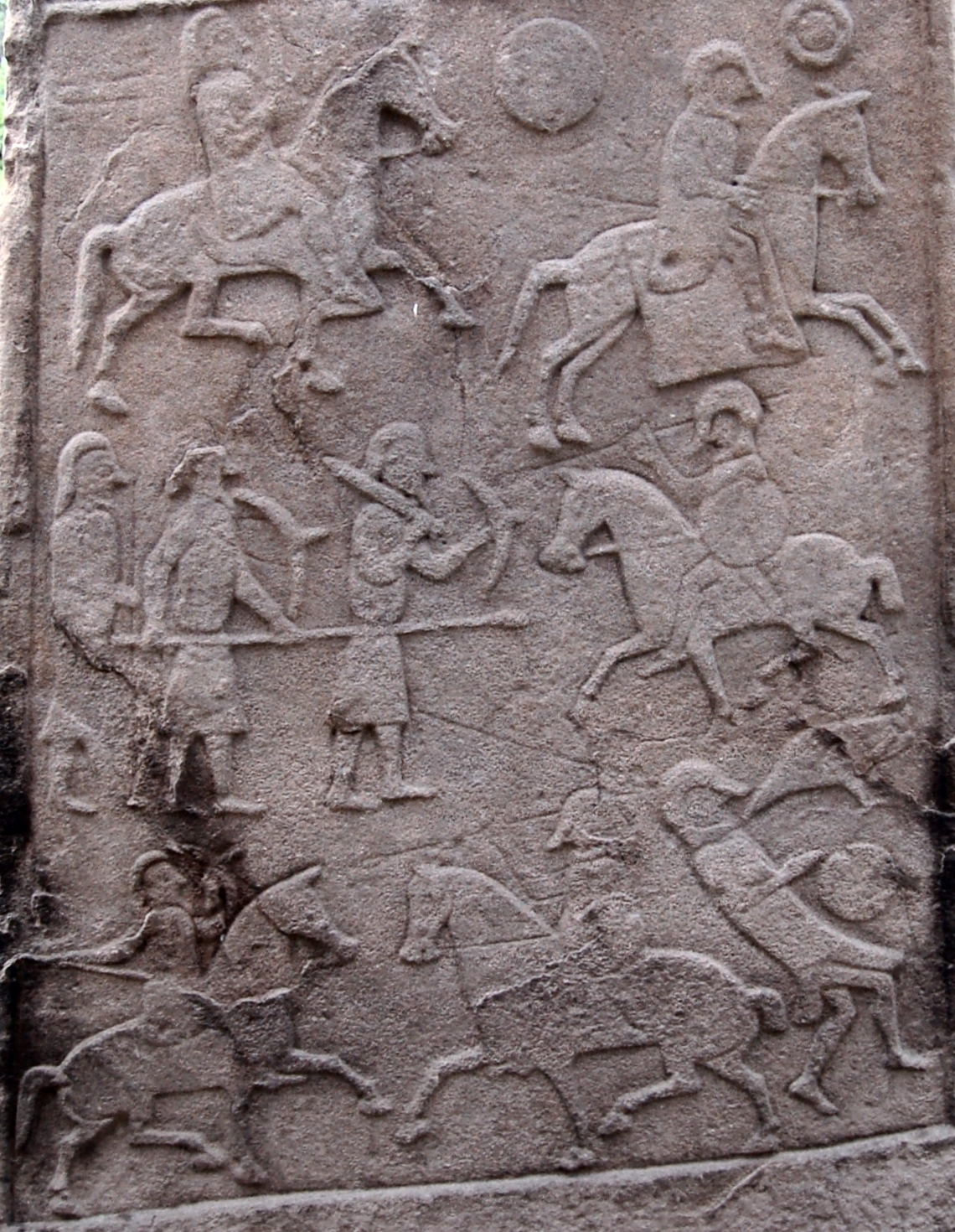
The battle scene from the Aberlemno Pictish stone, generally presumed to show the Battle of Dunnichen in 865

=== Warriors ===
In the politically divided world of early medieval Scotland the nucleus of most armed forces was a leader's bodyguard or war-band. In the Brittonic languages, this was called the teulu, as in teulu Dewr (the "War-band of Deira"). In Latin the most common word in this period is tutores, and derives from the Latin verb tueor, meaning "defend, preserve from danger". In peace-time, the war-band's activity was centred around the "Great Hall". Here, in both Germanic and Celtic cultures, the feasting, drinking and other forms of male bonding that kept up the war-band's integrity would take place. In the contemporaneous Old English epic poem Beowulf, the war-band was said to sleep in the Great Hall after the lord had retired to his adjacent bedchamber. It is not likely that any war-band in the period exceeded 120–150 men, as no hall structure having a capacity larger than this has been found by archaeologists in northern Britain. The war-band was the core of the larger armies that were mobilised from time to time for campaigns of significant size. These wider forces depended on the obligations to defend a province or kingdom by land and sea. Early sources from Dál Riata indicate an attempt to define this as an obligation based on landholding, with obligations to provide a specified number of men or ships based on the amount of land held by an individual. Pictish stones, like that at Aberlemno in Angus, show warriors with swords, spears, bows, helmets and shields. These images may show infantry in formation, or gathered together for protection, and they show mounted troops, sometimes heavily armoured, suggesting a mounted warrior elite.

=== Hill forts ===
Early fortifications in Scotland, particularly in the north and west, included modest stone built towers known as brochs and duns and, particularly in the south and east larger hill forts, There is evidence for about 1,000 Iron Age hillforts in Scotland, most located below the Clyde-Forth line. They appear to have been largely abandoned in the Roman period, but some seem to have been reoccupied after their departure. Most are circular, with a single palisade around an enclosure. Forts of the Early Medieval era were often smaller, more compact, "nucleated" constructions, sometimes utilising major geographical features, as at Dunadd and Dunbarton. The large number of hill forts in Scotland may have made open battle less important than it was in contemporaneous Anglo-Saxon England, and the relatively high proportion of kings who are recorded as dying in fires, suggest that sieges were a more important part of warfare in Northern Britain.

=== Ships ===
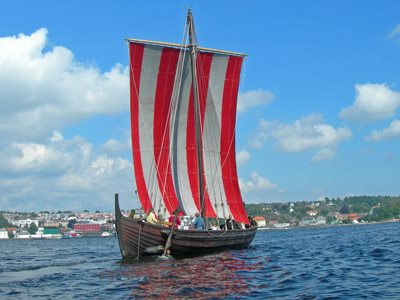
Modern replica of a Viking Knarr

Sea power may also have been important. Irish annals record an attack by the Picts on Orkney in 682, which must have necessitated a large naval force, and also they lost 150 ships in a disaster in 729. Ships were also vital in the amphibious warfare in the Highlands and Islands and from the seventh century the Senchus fer n-Alban indicates that Dál Riata had a ship-muster system that obliged groups of households to produce a total of 177 ships and 2,478 men. The same source mentions the first recorded naval battle around the British Isles in 719 and eight naval expeditions between 568 and 733. The only vessels to survive form this period are dugout canoes, but images from the period suggest that there may have been skin boats (similar to the Irish currach) and larger oared vessels. The Viking raids and invasions of the British Isles were based on superior sea-power, which enabled the creation of the thalassocracies (sea-based lordships) of the north and west. The long-ship, the key to their success, was a graceful, long, narrow, light, wooden boat with a shallow draft hull designed for speed. This shallow draft allowed navigation in waters only 3 feet (1 m) deep and permitted beach landings, while its light weight enabled it to be carried over portages. Longships were also double-ended, the symmetrical bow and stern allowing the ship to reverse direction quickly without having to turn around.

== High Middle Ages ==
=== Land forces ===
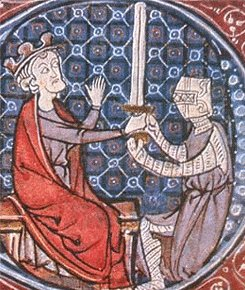
David I knighting a squire.

By the twelfth century the ability to call on wider bodies of men for major campaigns had become formalised as the "common" (communis exercitus) or "Scottish army" (exercitus Scoticanus), based on a universal obligation linked to the holding of variously named units of land. This could be used to produce a regional army, as the future Robert I did when, from 1298 to 1302, as Earl of Carrick, he raised "my army of Carrick", but also a national Scottish army, as he did later in the Wars of Independence. Later decrees indicated that the common army was a levy of all able-bodied freemen aged between 16 and 60, with 8-days warning. It produced relatively large numbers of men serving for a limited period, usually as unarmoured or poorly armoured bowmen and spearmen. In this period it continued to be mustered by the earls and they often led their men in battle, as was the case in the Battle of the Standard in 1138. It would continue to provide the vast majority of Scottish national armies, potentially producing tens of thousands of men for short periods of conflict, into the early modern era.

There also developed obligations that produced smaller numbers of feudal troops. The introduction of feudalism to Scotland is usually attributed to the Davidian Revolution of the twelfth century. When David I acceded to the Scottish throne in 1124 after spending much of his life living as a baron in England, he brought with him a number of Anglo-Norman vassals, to whom he distributed lands and titles, first in the lowlands and borders and then later in buffer zones in the North and West. Geoffrey Barrow wrote that among other changes this brought "fundamental innovations in military organization". These included the knight's fee, homage and fealty, as well as castle-building and the regular use of professional cavalry, as knights held castles and estates in exchange for service, providing troops on a 40-day basis. David's Norman followers and their retinues were able to provide a force of perhaps 200 mounted and armoured knights, but the vast majority of his forces were the "common army" of poorly armed infantry, capable of performing well in raiding and guerrilla warfare, but only infrequently able to stand up to the English in the field, as they managed to do critically in the wars of independence at Stirling Bridge in 1297 and Bannockburn in 1314.

=== Castles ===
Castles, in the sense of a fortified residence of a lord or noble, arrived in Scotland as part of David I's encouragement of Norman and French nobles to settle with feudal tenures, particularly in the south and east, and were a way of controlling the contested lowlands. These were primarily wooden motte-and-bailey constructions, of a raised mount or motte, surmounted by a wooden tower and a larger adjacent enclosure or bailey, both usually surrounded by a fosse (a ditch) and palisade, and connected by a wooden bridge. They varied in size from the very large such as the Bass of Inverurie, to more modest designs like Balmaclellan.

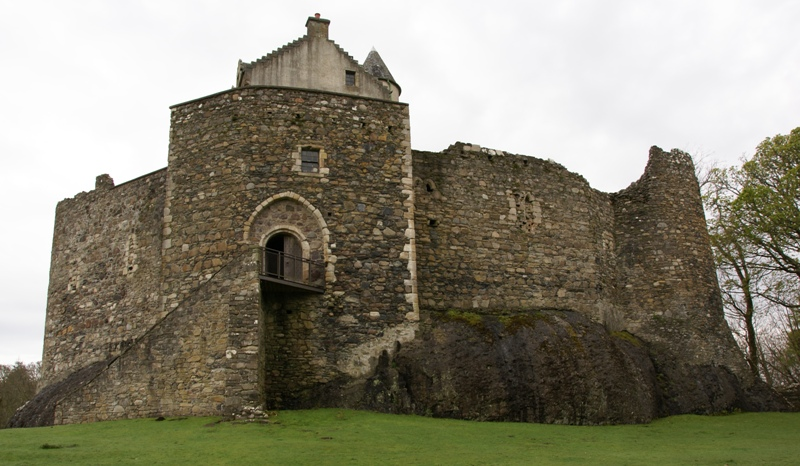
Dunstaffnage Castle, one of the oldest surviving "castles of enceinte", mostly dating from the thirteenth century

In England many of these constructions were converted into stone "keep-and-bailey" castles in the twelfth century, but in Scotland most of those that were in continued occupation became stone castles of "enceinte", with a high embattled curtain wall. In addition to the baronial castles there were royal castles, often larger and providing defence, lodging for the itinerant Scottish court and a local administrative centre. By 1200 these included fortifications at Ayr and Berwick. In the wars of Scottish Independence Robert I adopted a policy of castle destruction, rather than allow fortresses to be easily taken or retaken by the English and held against him, beginning with his own castles at Ayr and Dumfries, and including Roxburgh and Edinburgh.

=== Marine forces ===
In the Highlands and Islands, the longship was gradually succeeded by (in ascending order of size) the birlinn, highland galley and lymphad, which, were clinker-built ships, usually with a centrally-stepped mast, but also with oars that allowed them to be rowed. Like the longship, they had a high stem and stern, and were still small and light enough to be dragged across portages, but they replaced the steering-board with a stern-rudder from the late twelfth century. They could fight at sea, but rarely were able to match armed ships of the Scottish or English navies. However, they could usually outrun larger vessels and were extremely useful in quick raids and in aiding escape. Forces of ships were raised through obligations of a ship-levy through the system of ouncelands and pennylands, which have been argued to date back to the muster system of Dál Riata, but were probably introduced by Scandinavian settlers. Later evidence suggests that the supply of ships for war became linked to feudal obligations, with Celtic-Scandinavian lords, who had previously contributed as a result of a general levy on landholding, coming to hold their lands in exchange for specified numbers and sizes of ships supplied to the king. This process probably began in the thirteenth century, but would be intensified under Robert I. The importance of these ships was underlined by their becoming common in depictions on grave markers and in heraldry throughout the Highlands and Islands.

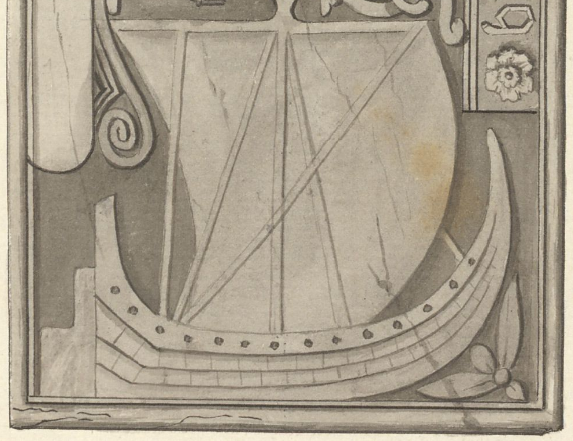
A carving of a birlinn from a sixteenth-century tombstone in MacDufie's Chapel, Oronsay, as engraved in 1772

There are mentions in Medieval records of fleets commanded by Scottish kings including William the Lion and Alexander II. The latter took personal command of a large naval force which sailed from the Firth of Clyde and anchored off the island of Kerrera in 1249, intended to transport his army in a campaign against the Kingdom of the Isles, but he died before the campaign could begin. Viking naval power was disrupted by conflicts between the Scandinavian kingdoms, but entered a period of resurgence in the thirteenth century when Norwegian kings began to build some of the largest ships seen in Northern European waters. These included king Hakon Hakonsson's Kristsúðin, built at Bergen from 1262–3, which was 260 feet (79 m) long, of 37 rooms. In 1263 Hakon responded to Alexander III's designs on the Hebrides by personally leading a major fleet of forty vessels, including the Kristsúðin, to the islands, where they were swelled by local allies to as many as 200 ships. Records indicate that Alexander had several large oared ships built at Ayr, but he avoided a sea battle. Defeat on land at the Battle of Largs and winter storms forced the Norwegian fleet to return home, leaving the Scottish crown as the major power in the region and leading to the ceding of the Western Isles to Alexander in 1266.

== Late Middle Ages ==
=== Armies ===
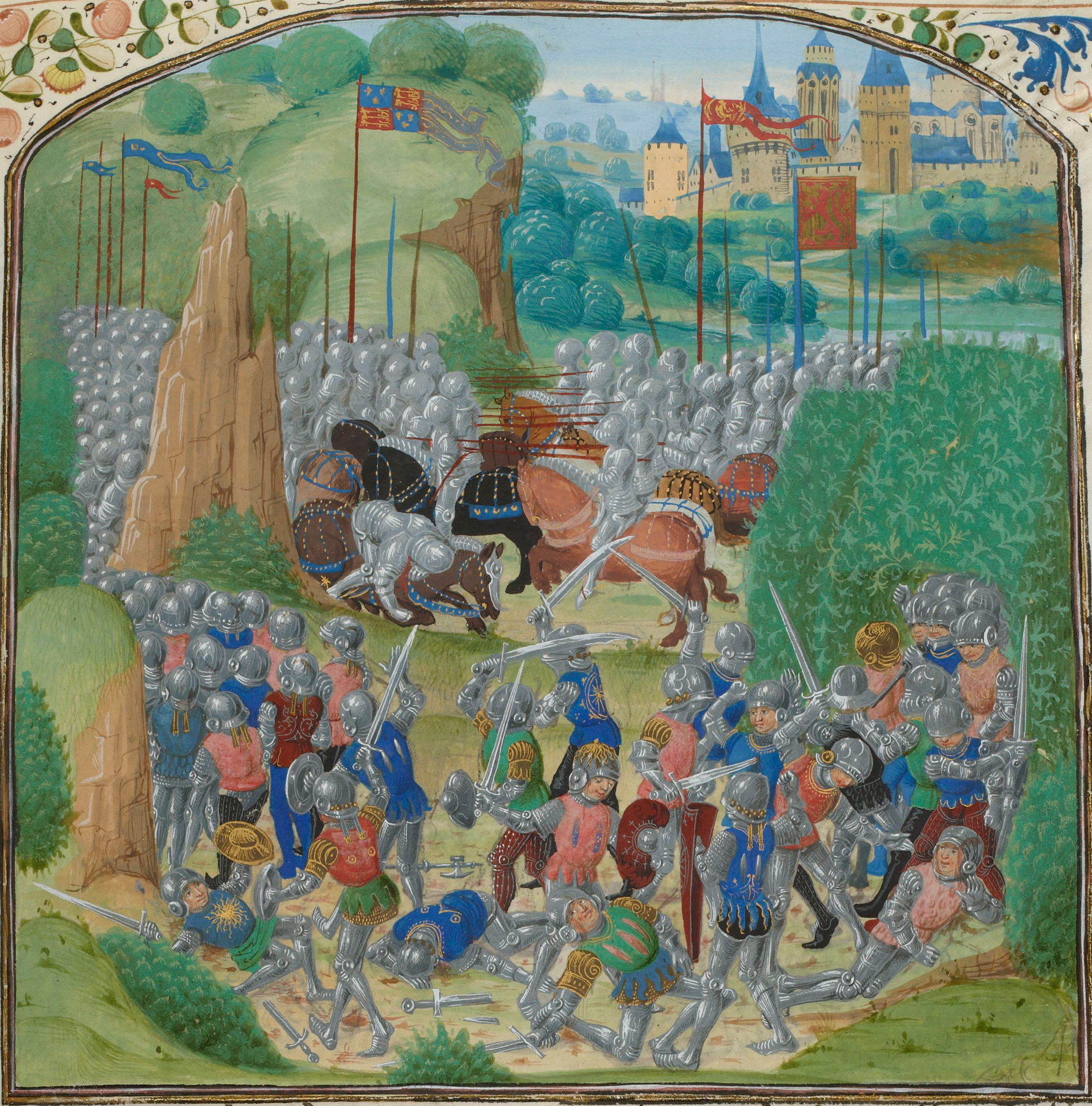
The Battle of Otterburn (1388) in a miniature from Jean Froissart, Chroniques

Scottish victories in the late thirteenth and early fourteenth centuries have been seen as part of a wider "infantry revolution", that saw a decline in the primacy of the mounted knight on the battlefield. However, it has been pointed out that Scottish medieval armies had probably always been dependent on infantry forces. In the late medieval period Scottish men-at-arms often dismounted to fight beside the infantry, with perhaps a small mounted reserve, and it has been suggested that these tactics were copied and refined by the English, leading to their successes in the Hundred Years' War. Like the English, the Scots deployed mounted archers, and even spearmen, who were particularly useful in the mobile raids that characterised border warfare, but like the English they fought on foot.

By the second half of the fourteenth century, in addition to forces raised on the basis of common service and feudal obligations, money contracts of bonds or bands of manrent, similar to English indentures of the same period, were being used to retain more professional troops, particular men-at-arms and archers. In practice, forms of service tended to blur and overlap, and several major Scottish lords brought contingents from their kindred. These systems produced relatively large numbers of poorly armoured infantry, usually armed with 12–14 foot (4 m) spears. They often formed the large close order defensive formations of shiltrons, able to counter mounted knights as they did at Bannockburn, or infantry assault as at Otterburn in 1388, but vulnerable to arrows (and later artillery fire) and relatively immobile, as they proved at Halidon Hill in 1333 and Humbleton Hill in 1402.

There were attempts to replace spears with longer pikes of 15.5 feet (5 m) to 18.5 feet (6 m) in the later fifteenth century, in emulation of successes over mounted troops in the Netherlands and Switzerland, but this does not appear to have been successful until the eve of the Flodden campaign in early sixteenth century. There were smaller numbers of archers and men-at-arms, which were often outnumbered when facing the English on the battlefield. Scottish archers were mainly drawn from the border regions, with those from Selkirk Forest gaining a particularly reputation. They became much sought after as mercenaries in French armies of the fifteenth century, in order to help counter the English superiority in this arm, becoming a major element of the French royal guards as the Garde Écossaise.

=== Fortification ===
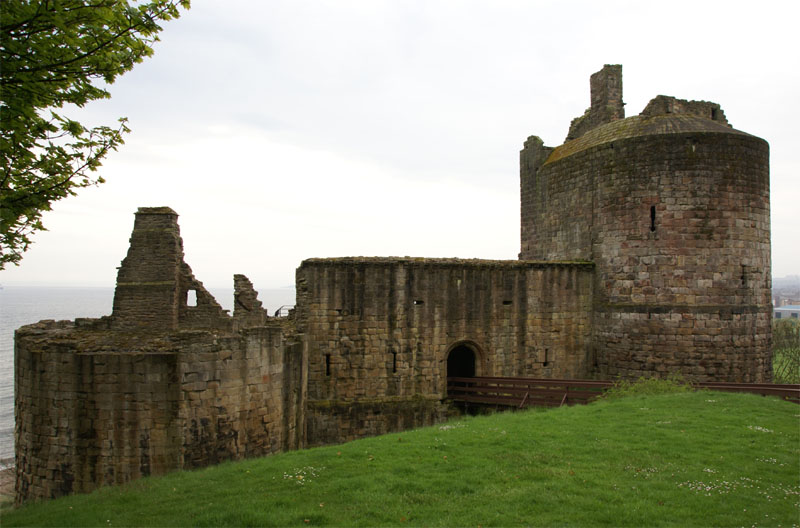
Ravenscraig Castle, perhaps the first fortification in the British Isles to take account of gunpowder artillery: the large D-plan bastion towers can be seen on either wing

After the Wars of Independence, new castles began to be built, often on a grander scale as "livery and maintenance" castles, to house retained troops, like Tantallon, Lothian and Doune near Stirling, rebuilt for Robert Stewart, Duke of Albany in the fourteenth century. The largest number of Late Medieval fortifications in Scotland built by nobles, about 800, were of the tower house design. Smaller versions of tower houses in southern Scotland were known as peel towers, or pele houses. The defences of tower houses were primarily aimed to provide protection against smaller raiding parties and were not intended to put up significant opposition to an organised military assault, leading historian Stuart Reid to characterise them as "defensible rather than defensive". They were typically a tall, square, stone-built, crenelated building; often also surrounded by a barmkyn or bawn, a walled courtyard designed to hold valuable animals securely, but not necessarily intended for serious defence. They were built extensively on both sides of the border with England, and James IV's forfeiture of the Lordship of the Isles in 1494 led to an immediate burst of castle building across the region.

Gunpowder weaponry fundamentally altered the nature of castle architecture, with existing castles being adapted to allow the use of gunpowder weapons by the incorporation of "keyhole" gun ports, platforms to mount guns and walls being adapted to resist bombardment. Ravenscraig, Kirkcaldy, begun about 1460, is probably the first castle in the British Isles to be built as an artillery fort, incorporating "D-shape" bastions that would better resist cannon fire and on which artillery could be mounted. Towards the end of the period royal builders in Scotland adopted European Renaissance styles in castle design. The grandest buildings of this type were the royal palaces in this style at Linlithgow, Holyrood, Falkland and the remodelled Stirling Castle, begun by James IV. A strong influence from France and the Low Countries can be seen in the fashionable design of a quadrangular court with stair-turrets on each corner. However, these were adapted to Scottish idioms and materials (particularly stone and harl).

=== Siege engines and artillery ===
The Wars of Independence brought the first recorded instances of major mechanical artillery in Scotland. Edward I used a range of siege engines, which were carefully constructed, transported, deployed, dismantled and stored for reuse. This began with the siege of Caerlaverock Castle in 1300. Here, after the failure of an initial assault, a small rock-throwing engine was employed, while three large engines (probably trebuchet, using a counter-weight mechanism), were constructed. Their destruction of walls demoralised the garrison and forced a surrender. Edward's armies deployed several such engines, often named, with "Warwolf", one of 17 used in the capture of Stirling Castle in 1304, being the best known (currently considered the largest trebuchet ever built). They also deployed lighter bolt-shooting balistas, belfry siege towers and on one occasion a covered sow. Some of these were supplied by Robert Earl of Carrick, the future Robert I, who was present on the English side. Scottish armies, with more limited resources and expertise tended to rely on assault, blockade and subterfuge as siege tactics. Robert I is known to have employed siege engines against the English, but often with little success, as at Carlisle in 1315 where his siege tower floundered in mud. The disparity in siege technology has been seen as resulting in a policy of castle destruction by Robert I.

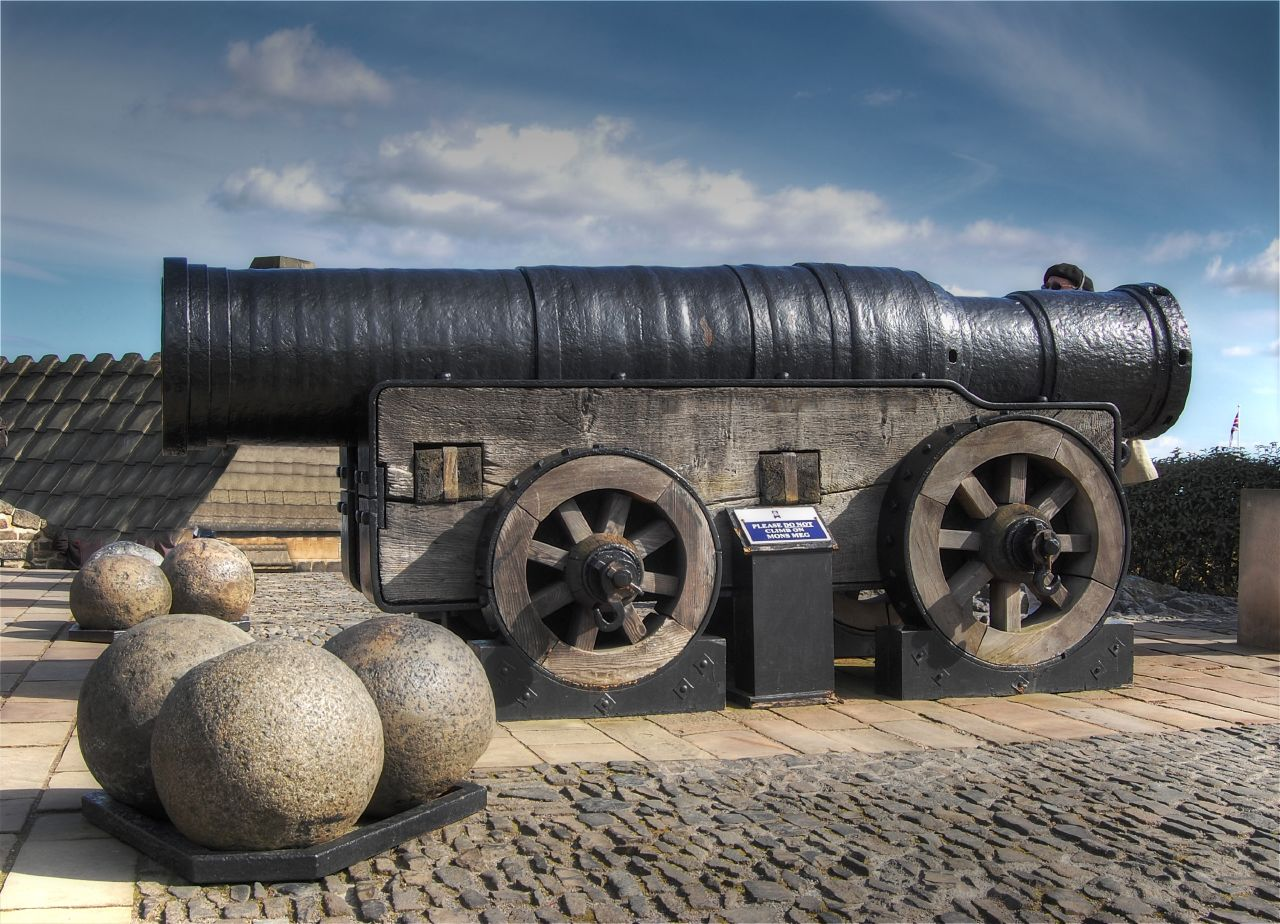
Mons Meg at Edinburgh Castle, with its 20" (50 cm) calibre cannonballs

Edward I had the major ingredients for gunpowder shipped to Stirling in 1304, probably to produce a form of Greek fire, to be shot into the town in earthenware pots by siege engines. The English probably had projectile gunpowder artillery in the 1320s and the Scots by the next decade. The first clear recorded use in Britain was when Edward III besieged Berwick in 1333, where it was used alongside mechanical siege engines. The first use by the Scots was probably against Stirling Castle in 1341. Gunpowder artillery began to fully replace mechanical engines in the late fourteenth century. The Stewarts attempted to follow the French and English crowns in building up an artillery train. The abortive siege of Roxburgh in 1436 under James I was probably the first conflict in which the Scots made serious use of artillery. James II had a royal gunner and received gifts of artillery from the continent, including two giant bombards made for Philip the Good, Duke of Burgundy, one of which, Mons Meg, still survives. Although these were probably already outdated on the continent, they represented impressive military technology when they reached Scotland. James II enthusiasm for artillery cost him his life and demonstrated some of the dangers of early artillery, when a gun exploded at the siege of Roxburgh in 1460. James III also experienced ill-fortune, when artillery sent from Sigismund, Archduke of Austria sank in a storm en route to Scotland in 1481. James IV brought in experts from France, Germany and the Netherlands and established a foundry in 1511. Edinburgh Castle had a house of artillery where visitors could see cannon cast for what became a formidable train, allowing him to send cannon to France and Ireland and to quickly subdue Norham Castle in the Flodden campaign. However, his 18 heavy artillery pieces had to be drawn by 400 oxen and slowed the advancing Scots army, proving ineffective against the longer range and smaller calibre English guns at the Battle of Flodden.

=== Navy ===
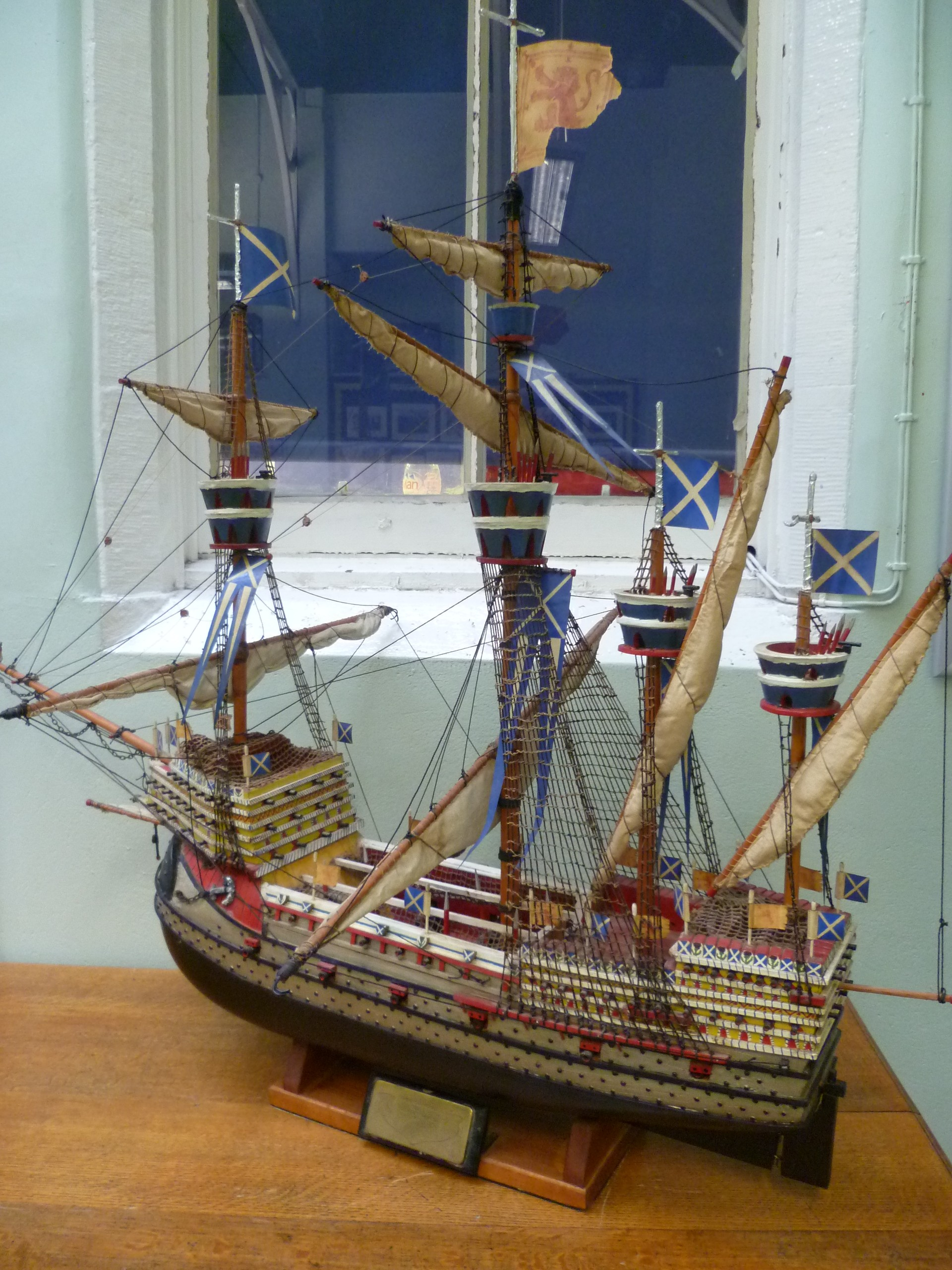
A model of the Great Michael, the largest ship in the world when launched in 1511

English naval power was vital to Edward I's successful campaigns in Scotland from 1296, using largely merchant ships from England, Ireland and his allies in the Islands to transport and supply his armies. Part of the reason for Robert I's success was his ability to call on naval forces from the Islands. As a result of the expulsion of the Flemings from England in 1303, he gained the support of a major naval power in the North Sea. The development of naval power allowed Robert to successfully defeat English attempts to capture him in the Highlands and Islands and to blockade major English controlled fortresses at Perth and Stirling, the last forcing Edward II to attempt the relief that resulted at English defeat at Bannockburn in 1314. Scottish naval forces allowed invasions of the Isle of Man in 1313 and 1317 and Ireland in 1315. They were also crucial in the blockade of Berwick, which led to its fall in 1318.

After the establishment of Scottish independence, Robert I turned his attention to building up a Scottish naval capacity. This was largely focused on the west coast, with the Exchequer Rolls of 1326 recording the feudal duties of his vassals in that region to aid him with their vessels and crews. Towards the end of his reign he supervised the building of at least one royal man-of-war near his palace at Cardross on the River Clyde. In the late fourteenth century naval warfare with England was conducted largely by hired Scots, Flemish and French merchantmen and privateers. James I took a greater interest in naval power. After his return to Scotland in 1424, he established a shipbuilding yard at Leith, a house for marine stores, and a workshop. King's ships were built and equipped there to be used for trade as well as war, one of which accompanied him on his expedition to the Islands in 1429. The office of Lord High Admiral was probably founded in this period. In his struggles with his nobles in 1488 James III received assistance from his two warships the Flower and the King's Carvel also known as the Yellow Carvel.

James IV put the enterprise on a new footing, founding a harbour at Newhaven in May 1504, and two years later ordering the construction of a dockyard at the Pools of Airth. The upper reaches of the Forth were protected by new fortifications on Inchgarvie. The king acquired a total of 38 ships for the Royal Scottish Navy, including the Margaret, and the carrack Michael or Great Michael. The latter, built at great expense at Newhaven and launched in 1511, was 240 feet (73 m) in length, weighed 1,000 tons, had 24 cannon, and was, at that time, the largest ship in Europe. Scottish ships had some success against privateers, accompanied the king in his expeditions in the islands and intervened in conflicts Scandinavia and the Baltic. In the Flodden campaign the fleet consisted of 16 large and 10 smaller craft. After a raid on Carrickfergus in Ireland, it joined up with the French and had little impact on the war. After the disaster at Flodden the Great Michael, and perhaps other ships, were sold to the French and the king's ships disappeared from royal records after 1516.

== See also ==
- Schiltron
- List of battles between Scotland and England

== Bibliography ==
- Alcock, L., Kings and Warriors, Craftsmen and Priests in Northern Britain AD 550–850 (Edinburgh: Society of Antiquaries of Scotland, 2003), ISBN 0-903903-24-5.
- Allmand, C. T., The Hundred Years War: England and France at War, c. 1300-c. 1450 (Cambridge: Cambridge University Press, 1988), ISBN 0-521-31923-4.
- Armstrong, P., Otterburn 1388: Bloody Border Conflict (Botley: Osprey, 2006), ISBN 1-84176-980-0.
- Barrell, A. D. M., Medieval Scotland (Cambridge: Cambridge University Press, 2000), ISBN 0-521-58602-X.
- Barrow, G. W. S., Scotland and its Neighbours in the Middle Ages (London: Continuum, 1992), ISBN 1-85285-052-3.
- Barrow, G. W. S., Robert Bruce and the Community of the Realm of Scotland (Edinburgh: Edinburgh University Press, 4th edn., 2005), ISBN 0-7486-2022-2.
- Brown, M., The Wars of Scotland, 1214–1371 (Edinburgh: Edinburgh University Press, 2004), ISBN 0-7486-1238-6.
- Brown, M., Bannockburn: the Scottish War and the British Isles, 1307–1323 (Edinburgh: Edinburgh University Press, 2008), ISBN 0-7486-3333-2.
- Brown, M., Scottish Baronial Castles 1250–1450 (Botley: Osprey, 2009), ISBN 1-84603-286-5.
- Caldwell, D. H., "The Scots and guns", in A. King and M. A. Penman, eds, England and Scotland in the Fourteenth Century: New Perspectives (Woodbridge: Boydell & Brewer, 2007), ISBN 1-84383-318-2.
- Cooper, J., Scottish Renaissance Armies 1513–1550 (Botley: Osprey, 2008), ISBN 1-84603-325-X.
- Contamine, P., "Scottish soldiers in France in the second half of the 15th century: mercenaries, immigrants, or Frenchmen in the making?" in G. G. Simpson, ed., The Scottish Soldier Abroad, 1247–1967 (Edinburgh: Rowman & Littlefield, 1992), ISBN 0-85976-341-2.
- Cornell, D., Bannockburn: the Triumph of Robert the Bruce (New Haven, CT: Yale University Press, 2009), ISBN 0-300-14568-3.
- Dawson, J. E. A., The Politics of Religion in the Age of Mary, Queen of Scots: The Earl of Argyll and the Struggle for Britain and Ireland (Cambridge: Cambridge University Press, 2002), ISBN 0-521-80996-7.
- Dawson, J. E. A., Scotland Re-Formed, 1488–1587 (Edinburgh: Edinburgh University Press, 2007), ISBN 0-7486-1455-9.
- Duncan, A. A. M., "The Making of the Kingdom" in, R. Mitchison, ed., Why Scottish History Matters (Edinburgh: Saltire Society, 1997), ISBN 0-8541-1070-4.
- Edwards, K. J., and Ralston, I., Scotland after the Ice Age: Environment, Archaeology and History, 8000 BC – AD 1000 (Edinburgh: Edinburgh University Press, 2003), ISBN 0-7486-1736-1.
- Emery, A., Greater Medieval Houses of England and Wales, 1300–1500: Northern England (Cambridge: Cambridge University Press, 1996), ISBN 978-0-521-49723-7.
- Glendinning, M., MacInnes, R., and MacKechnie, A., A History of Scottish Architecture: from the Renaissance to the Present Day (Edinburgh: Edinburgh University Press, 2002), ISBN 978-0-7486-0849-2.
- Gosman, M., MacDonald, A. A., and Vanderjagt, A. J., Princes and Princely Culture, 1450–1650, Volume 1 (Leiden: Brill, 2003), ISBN 90-04-13572-3.
- Goudsward, D., The Westford Knight and Henry Sinclair: Evidence of a 14th Century Scottish Voyage to North America (Jefferson, NC: McFarland, 2010), ISBN 0-7864-4649-8.
- Grant, J., "The Old Scots Navy from 1689 to 1710", Publications of the Navy Records Society, 44 (London: Navy Records Society, 1913-4).
- Hamilton, J. S., The Plantagenets: History of a Dynasty (London: Continuum, 2010), ISBN 1-4411-5712-3.
- Henning Kortüm, H., Transcultural Wars from the Middle Ages to the 21st Century (Berlin: Akademie Verlag, 2006), ISBN 3-05-004131-5.
- Hull, L. E., Britain's Medieval Castles (Westport: Praeger, 2006), ISBN 978-0-275-98414-4.
- Hunter, J., Last of the Free: A History of the Highlands and Islands of Scotland (London: Random House, 2011), ISBN 1-78057-006-6.
- Kaeuper, R. W., Violence in Medieval Society (Woodbridge: Boydell & Brewer, 2000), ISBN 0-85115-774-2.
- Kinard, J., Artillery: An Illustrated History of its Impact (Santa Barbara, CA: ABC-CLIO, 2007), ISBN 1-85109-556-X.
- Konstam, A., Strongholds of the Picts: The Fortifications of Dark Age Scotland (Botley: Osprey, 2010), ISBN 1846036860.
- Laing, L. R., The Archaeology of Celtic Britain and Ireland, C. AD 400–1200 (Cambridge: Cambridge University Press, 2nd edn., 2006), ISBN 0-521-54740-7.
- Lepage, J-D. G. G., British Fortifications Through the Reign of Richard III: An Illustrated History (Jefferson, NC: McFarland, 2012), ISBN 0-7864-5918-2.
- Macdougall, N., James IV (East Lothian: Tuckwell, 1997), ISBN 0-859-76200-9.
- Macquarrie, A., Medieval Scotland: Kinship and Nation (Thrupp: Sutton, 2004), ISBN 0-7509-2977-4.
- Mersey, D., Warriors (Conway: Maritime Press, 2007), ISBN 1-84486-039-6.
- Murdoch, S., The Terror of the Seas?: Scottish Maritime Warfare, 1513–1713 (Leiden: Brill, 2010), ISBN 90-04-18568-2.
- Palliser, D. M., The Cambridge Urban History of Britain: 600–1540, Volume 1 (Cambridge: Cambridge University Press, 2000), ISBN 0-521-44461-6.
- Piggott, S., The Prehistoric Peoples of Scotland, London: Taylor & Francis, 1962, OCLC 560286204.
- Piggott, S., and Thirsk, J., The Agrarian History of England and Wales: Prehistory: Volume 1 of Agrarian History of England and Wales (Cambridge: Cambridge University Press, 1981), ISBN 0-521-08741-4.
- Potter, P. J., Gothic Kings of Britain: the Lives of 31 Medieval Rulers, 1016–1399 (Jefferson, NC: McFarland, 2008), ISBN 0-7864-4038-4.
- Prestwich, M., Edward I (Berkeley, CA: University of California Press, 1988), ISBN 0-520-06266-3.
- Purton, P., A History of the Late Medieval Siege, 1200–1500 (Woodbridge: Boydell & Brewer, 2009), ISBN 1-84383-449-9.
- Reid, S., Castles and Tower Houses of the Scottish Clans, 1450–1650 (Botley: Osprey, 2006), ISBN 978-1-84176-962-2.
- Ritchie, J. N. G., and Ritchie, A., Scotland, Archaeology and Early History (Edinburgh: Edinburgh University Press, 2nd edn., 1991), ISBN 0-7486-0291-7.
- Rodger, N. A. M., The Safeguard of the Sea: A Naval History of Britain. Volume One 660–1649 (London: Harper, 1997), ISBN 0-14-191257-X.
- Simpson, G. G., and Webster, B., "Charter Evidence and the Distribution of Mottes in Scotland," in R. Liddiard, ed., Anglo-Norman Castles (Woodbridge: Boydell Press, 2003), ISBN 978-0-85115-904-1.
- Smout, T. C., Scotland and the Sea (Edinburgh: Rowman and Littlefield, 1992), ISBN 0-85976-338-2.
- Stell, G., "War-damaged Castles: the evidence from Medieval Scotland," in Chateau Gaillard: Actes du colloque international de Graz (Autriche) (Caen, France: Publications du CRAHM, 2000), ISBN 978-2-902685-09-7.
- Stringer, K. J., The Reign of Stephen: Kingship, Warfare, and Government in Twelfth-Century England (London: Psychology Press, 1993), ISBN 0-415-01415-8.
- Tabraham, C. J., Scotland's Castles (London: Batsford, 2005), ISBN 978-0-7134-8943-9.
- Toy, S., Castles: Their Construction and History (New York: Dover Publications, 1985), ISBN 978-0-486-24898-1.
- Tucker, S., Battles That Changed History: An Encyclopedia of World Conflict (Santa Barbara, CA: ABC-CLIO, 2010), ISBN 1-59884-429-6.
- Tytler, P. F., History of Scotland, Volume 2 (London: Black, 1829).
- Wagner, J. A., Encyclopedia of the Hundred Years War (London: Greenwood, 2006), ISBN 0-313-32736-X.
- West, T. W., Discovering Scottish Architecture (Botley: Osprey, 1985), ISBN 0-85263-748-9.
- Whyte, I. D., and Whyte, K. A., The Changing Scottish Landscape, 1500–1800 (London: Routledge, 1991) ISBN 978-0-415-02992-6.
- Williams, G., "Land assessment and the silver economy of Norse Scotland", in G. Williams and P. Bibire, eds, Sagas, Saints and Settlements (Leiden: Brill, 2004), ISBN 90-04-13807-2.
- Wormald, J., Court, Kirk, and Community: Scotland, 1470–1625 (Edinburgh: Edinburgh University Press, 1991), ISBN 0-7486-0276-3.
- Yorke, B., "Kings and kingship", in P. Stafford, ed., A Companion to the Early Middle Ages: Britain and Ireland, c.500-c.1100 (Chichester: Wiley-Blackwell, 2009), ISBN 1-4051-0628-X.
