= Battle of Largs =

1263 battle of the Scottish-Norwegian War

- Part of the Scottish–Norwegian War
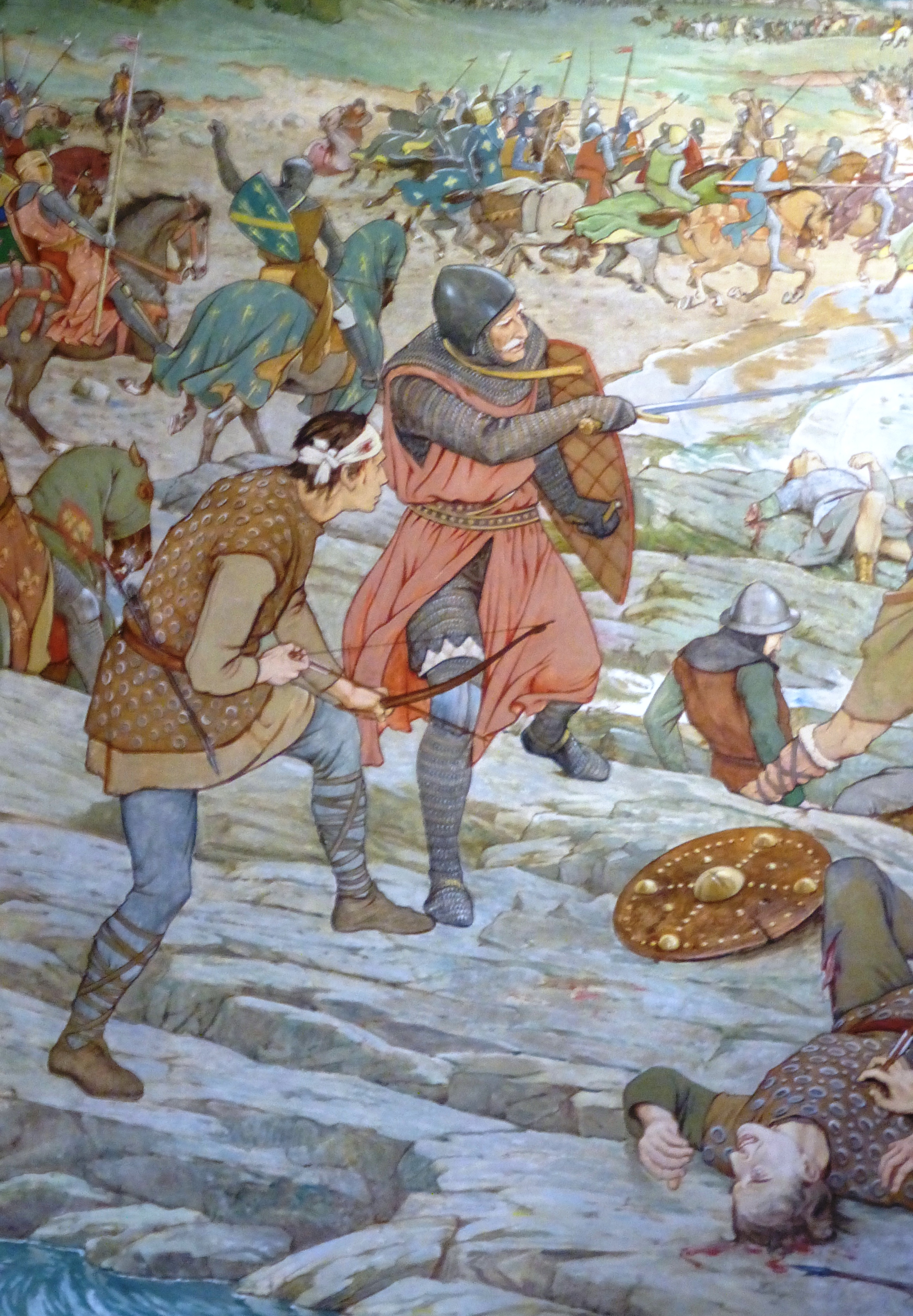
- Detail from William Hole's mural of the Battle of Largs, in the Scottish National Portrait Gallery
Date	2 October 1263
Location	Largs, North Ayrshire, Scotland 55.7926°N 4.8679°W
Result	Scottish victory

Belligerents
Kingdom of Scotland	(Kingdom of Norway (872–1397)) Norway

Commanders and leaders
Alexander of Dundonald	King Haakon IV
- Location within Scotland Battle of Largs (Northern and Central Europe)

The Battle of Largs (2 October 1263) was a battle between the kingdoms of Norway and Scotland, on the Firth of Clyde near Largs, Scotland. The conflict formed part of the Norwegian expedition against Scotland in 1263, in which Haakon Haakonsson, King of Norway attempted to reassert Norwegian sovereignty over the western seaboard of Scotland. Victory was achieved by the Scots with a crafty three-tiered strategy on the part of the young Scottish king, Alexander III: plodding diplomacy forced the campaign to bad weather months and a ferocious storm ravaged the Norwegian fleet, stripping it of many vessels and supplies and making the forces on the Scottish coast vulnerable to an attack that forced the Norwegians into a hasty retreat that was to end their 500-year history of invasion, and leaving Scotland to consolidate its resources into building the nation.

Since the beginning of the 12th century, Largs in the north Ayrshire area of Scotland had lain at the periphery of the Norwegian realm, ruled by magnates who recognised the overlordship of the kings of Norway. In the mid-13th century, two Scottish kings, Alexander II and his son Alexander III, attempted to incorporate the region into their own realm. Following Alexander III's early, failed attempts to purchase the islands from the Norwegian king, the Scots launched military operations to end the issue altogether by asserting royal sovereignty over all of western Scotland. Haakon responded to the Scottish aggression by leading a massive Norwegian fleet, thought to number in the thousands of vessels, that reached the Hebrides in the summer of 1263. Realising that the Scots were tremendously outnumbered by an experienced and mobile enemy, Alexander III sought a protracted diplomatic intervention that would buy time to acquire more troops and possibly force the Norwegians into the stormy autumn and winter months where an invasion could be stalled due to weather. By late September, Haakon's fleet occupied the Firth of Clyde and the temperate days were almost at an end. When negotiations between the kingdoms broke down, Haakon brought the bulk of his fleet to anchor off the Cumbraes, poised to invade Scotland at a site of his choosing.

On the night of 1 October, during a bout of stormy weather, several Norwegian vessels were driven aground on the Ayrshire coast, near present-day Largs. On 2 October, while the Norwegians were salvaging their vessels, the main Scottish army arrived on the scene. Composed of infantry and cavalry, the Scottish force was commanded by Alexander of Dundonald, Steward of Scotland. The Norwegians were gathered in two groups: the larger main force on the beach and a small contingent atop a nearby mound. The advance of the Scots threatened to divide the Norwegian forces, so the contingent on the mound ran to rejoin their comrades on the beach below. Seeing them running from the mound, the Norwegians on the beach believed they were retreating and fled back towards the ships. There was fierce fighting on the beach, and the Scots took up a position on the mound formerly held by the Norwegians. Late in the day, the Norwegians recaptured the mound after several hours of skirmishing. The Scots withdrew from the scene and the Norwegians reboarded their ships. They returned the next morning to collect their dead. With the weather deteriorating, Haakon's fleet sailed to Orkney to overwinter.

The battle is commemorated in Largs by an early 20th-century monument, and festivities held there annually since the 1980s.

== Context ==
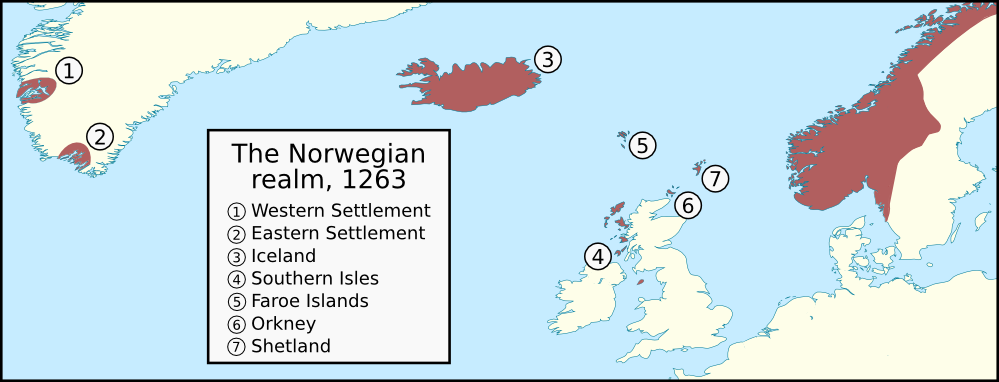
The Norwegian realm in 1263, at about the time of the Battle of Largs

Viking depredations have been recorded in the British Isles since the late 8th century, and Scandinavian settlement on Scotland's western-seaboard may have begun before the turn of the 9th century. Claims to this region by Norwegian kings date to the turn of the 12th century, when Magnus Olafsson, King of Norway (d. 1103) established himself in the Hebrides and the Isle of Man (Mann). Direct Norwegian control ended with Magnus' death, after which the Hebrides and Mann, known to the Norwegians as the "Southern Isles", were controlled by local dynasties for over a century and a half. In the first half of the 13th century, the seaboard was controlled by two main power blocks: one consisting of the Mann, Lewis and Harris, and Skye—controlled by the patrilineal descendants of Godred Crovan (d. 1095); the other consisting of mainland territories in Argyll, and the islands of Islay, Jura, Mull, and possibly Uist—controlled by the descendants of Somerled (d. 1164). As part of the far-flung, early 13th century Norwegian realm, these island rulers recognised the overlordship of Haakon Haakonarson, King of Norway (d. 1263).

The first half of the 13th century was a period of consolidation for both Scottish and Norwegian kings. The Norwegians, under Haakon, overcame a period of internal strife, from 1161 to 1208, and oversaw the submission of the Faroe Islands, the Greenland settlements, and Iceland, in the mid 13th century. The Scots, under Alexander II, King of Scots (d. 1249), extended royal authority into the northern Highlands, Argyll, and Galloway. The king also wanted to incorporate the western seaboard into the Scottish realm. In 1230, Scottish aggression against the Isles and interference forced the Norwegian king to pacify the region. In 1249, after attempting to purchase the Isles from Haakon, Alexander II launched a campaign of his own, deep into Argyll and into the Hebrides. Unfortunately for the Scots, their king died suddenly on the verge of conquest. Since his son and successor, Alexander III (d. 1286), was only a boy at the time, the Scottish realm suffered through a lengthy and troubled minority. In consequence, it wasn't until the 1260s that the king looked west and attempted to finish what his father had so nearly accomplished.

In 1262, a year after another unsuccessful attempt to purchase the Isles, Scottish forces launched an attack upon Skye. Haakon's response to the invasion was to mastermind a massive military expedition of his own. Described by the Icelandic Annals as the largest force to have ever set sail from Norway, the fleet reached the Isles in the summer of 1263. After receiving only a lukewarm reception from his vassals in the region, Haakon's forces reached the Firth of Clyde, after his men had secured several castles, and undertook raids into the surrounding mainland. With the Norwegian fleet anchored off Arran, the Norwegians and Scottish embassies fiercely debated the sovereignty of the Islands of the Clyde. When talks broke down, Haakon dispatched a fleet of Islesmen to raid into Loch Lomond, and to ravage Lennox. Meanwhile, the main Norwegian fleet repositioned itself between the Cumbraes and the Ayrshire coast.

== Actions ==
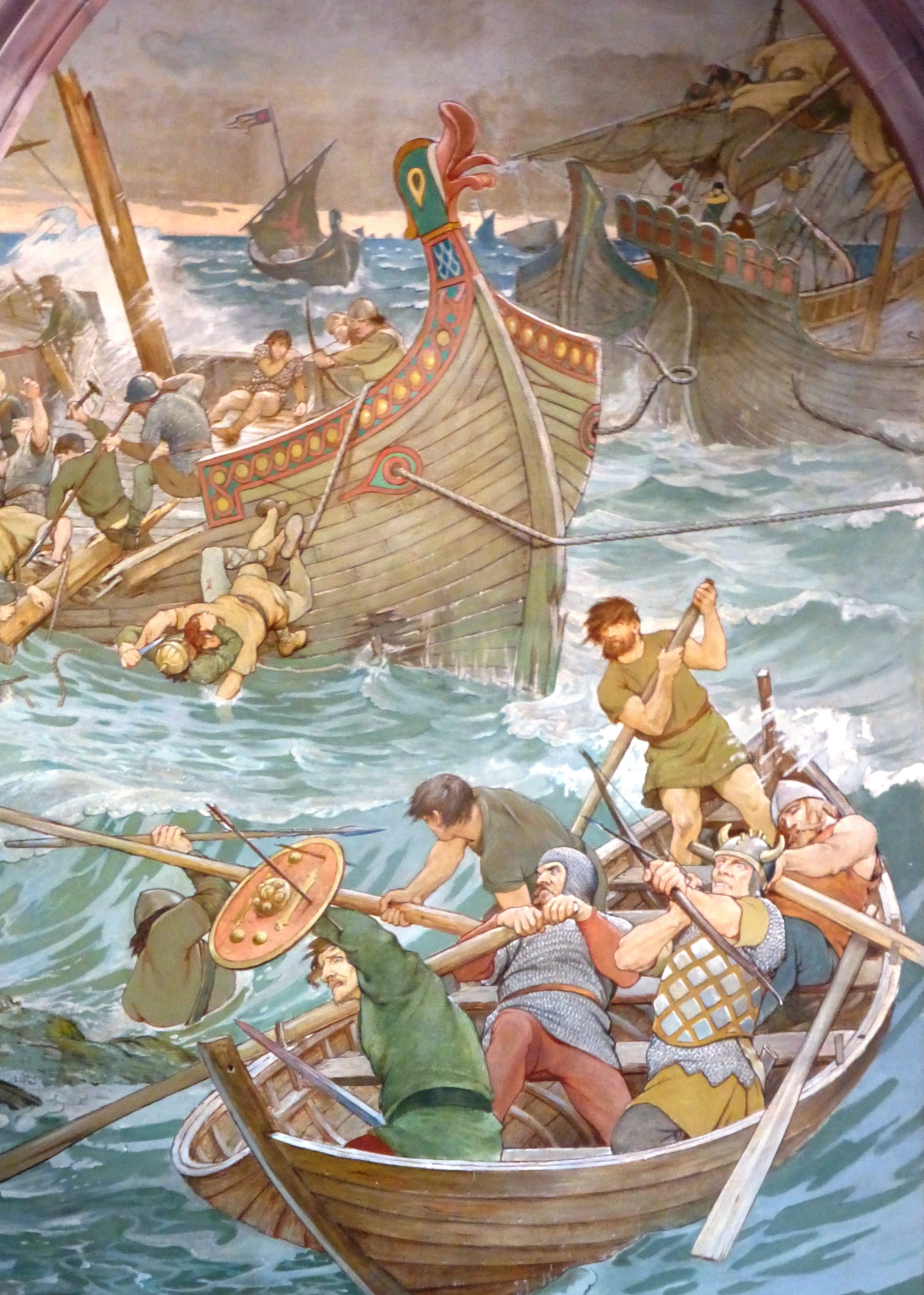
Haakon's ships depicted on William Hole's mural in the Scottish National Portrait Gallery

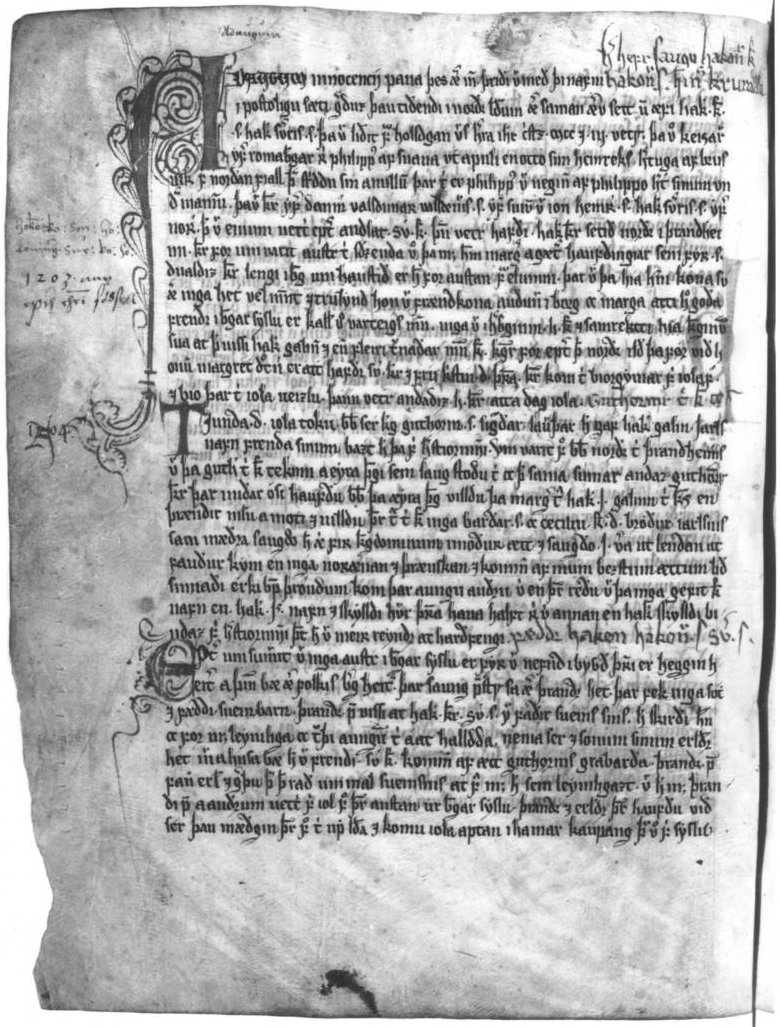
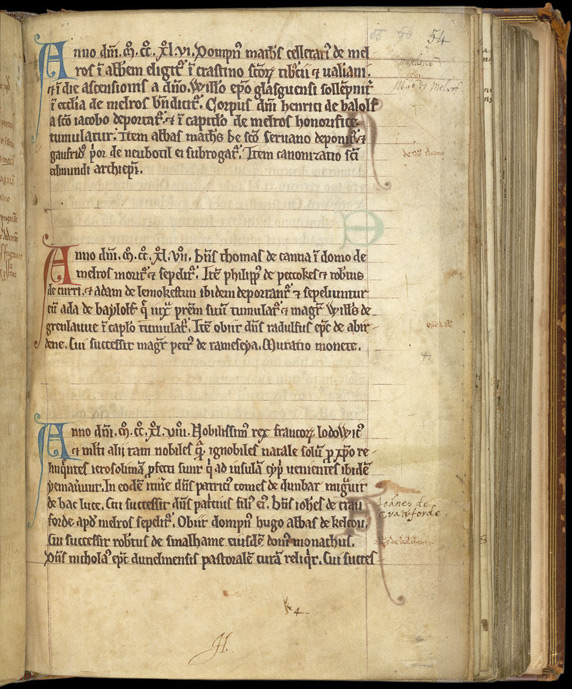
Left: a 14th-century folio containing part of Hákonar saga Hákonarsonar. Right: a folio from the earliest manuscript form of the Chronicle of Melrose.

The main Norwegian source for the battle is Hakonar saga Hakonarsonar, a contemporary account of the life of Hakon Haakonarson, King of Norway (d. 1263), composed by the Icelandic historian Sturla Thordarson (d. 1284). Although the saga describes the events purely from the Norwegian perspective, its narrative of the battle appears to have been drawn from eyewitness accounts, and it is the most detailed source available for the Scottish–Norwegian conflict, given that many contemporary Scottish archival holdings are lost to history. A contemporary Scottish perspective of the events is preserved in a brief entry in the Chronicle of Melrose. First penned at Melrose Abbey in the last quarter of the 12th century, the chronicle was further extended and supplemented from time to time into the late 13th century. It is an important historical source for the mediaeval Scottish realm. Clan and remaining royal records of property and titles subsequent to the event are also informative.

While lying off the Cumbraes, on the night of 30 September, Haakon's fleet was battered by stormy weather. During the night, the saga records that a merchantman dragged its anchor and was driven aground. The following morning, it and four other vessels were floated off by the rising tide but carried by the current towards the Scottish mainland where they ran aground again. The crews of the beached vessels were soon harassed by a small force of Scots armed with bows. After the Norwegians had suffered some casualties, Haakon sent reinforcements ashore, and the Scots fled the area. Haakon's reinforcements remained ashore for the night, and the Norwegian king himself came ashore to oversee the salvage operation the next morning.

According to the saga, the main Scottish force, consisting of heavily armoured cavalry and infantry, arrived on 2 October. The saga numbers the mounted troops at about 500 and states that they rode high-quality horses protected by mail. The use of a substantial force of mounted knights or sergeants appears to be corroborated in contemporary records of payments made to troops. For example, Walter Stewart, Earl of Menteith had to maintain 120 sergeants—which could include knights, mounted men-at-arms, archers, or other footsoldiers—at Ayr Castle for three weeks. Although surviving records fail to mention the number of knights assembled at Ayr, the record of wages suggests that it was "more than a mere handful". According to the saga, the Scottish infantry were armed with bows and "Irish axes", and since at one point the Scots are said to have thrown stones at the Norwegians, the Scottish army must have also included slingers. The Latin Chronicle of Melrose simply describes the Scottish infantry as pedisequi patrie (the "foot-sloggers of the locality"). If this description refers to the men of the surrounding countryside, the Scottish infantry would have been made up of men from the 'common army', drawn only from Strathgryffe, Cunninghame and Kyle. These levies would have been mustered by the Sheriff of Ayr, the Sheriff of Lanark, and the local magnates. At the time of Largs, the Scottish king thus had at his disposal men from the 'common army' (lesser men who owed service to their king), the feudal host (greater men who owed military service for their lands), and also paid troops.

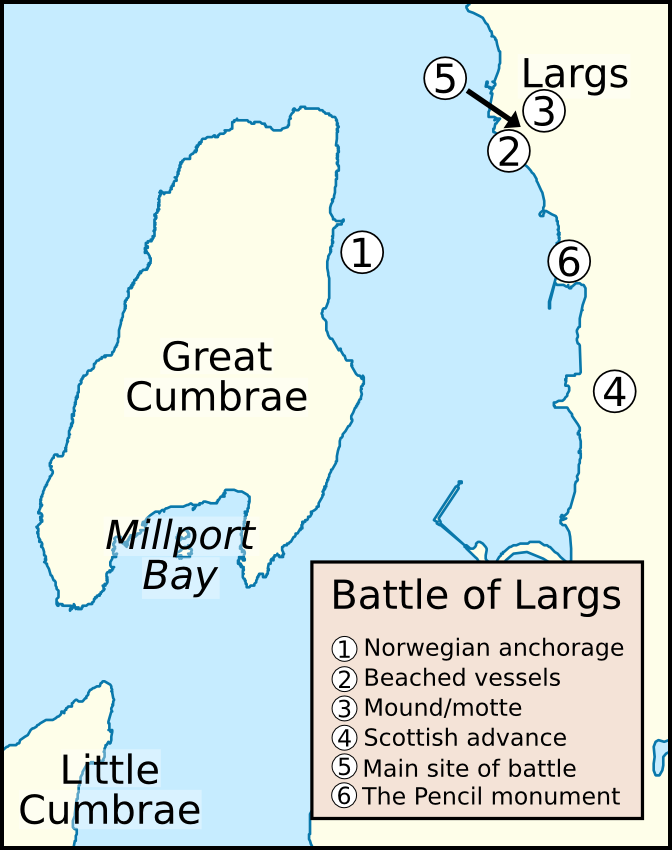
Area of conflict

The evidence suggests that the main Scottish force arrived from the south, rather than from the east or the north. For example, Alexander III is recorded to have been south at Ayr in September, and the power centre of Alexander of Dundonald, Steward of Scotland (d. 1282), who is thought to have commanded the Scottish forces at the battle, was also located to the south. Furthermore, at the time of the battle, the Sheriff of Ayr was probably a member of the steward's family—probably his younger brother, the Earl of Menteith. (Note: Walter was certainly sheriff by 1264, and probably held the position earlier.) If the Scots had indeed arrived from the south, then they would have also assembled at a mustering site to the south, possibly somewhere near Ayr. The saga indicates that the Norwegians were divided into two groups. The smaller force numbered 200 men, was stationed on a mound, somewhat inland from the beach, under the command of a Norwegian nobleman Ogmund Crouchdance. The main Norwegian force, numbering about 700 to 800 men (including Haakon himself), was stationed on the beach below. These two detachments were likely only a fraction of the total number of forces at Haakon's disposal. The numbers that the saga allows for either side may be exaggerated. A more likely number may be only about one hundred or several hundred men per side with the number of knights present may have been closer to 50 than the saga's 500. The forces which Haakon had mustered in Norway formed part of his realm's leidang, a naval levy in which districts contributed men, ships, and provisions for military service.

Alexander III's seal illustrates the armament of a contemporary mounted knight.

As the Scots advanced towards the Norwegians, the saga indicates that Ogmund withdrew his troops from the mound to avoid being cut off from his comrades on the beach below. If the Scots had indeed marched northwards, their advance would have threatened to drive a wedge between the Norwegians on the mound and those on the beach. Once the Scottish vanguard came into contact with Ogmund's men, the saga indicates that his orderly withdrawal disintegrated into a chaotic scramble. On the beach below, Haakon followed the advice of his men and retired to the safety of his ships. To the men on the beach, the rapid descent of Ogmund's men towards them looked like an all-out retreat; they turned and fled. The Norwegian army was thus routed, and in the mad dash back to their ships they suffered substantial casualties. Some of the Norwegians may have used the beached vessels as makeshift fortifications, since the saga notes that a group of them made a bold stand by their ships, out-numbered ten to one, in a fierce engagement in which a particularly valiant Scottish knight was slain. (Note: The saga identifies the knight as Perus. Although it is possible that this name could refer to Fergus, a name borne by the family of Ardrossan, it is more likely that it refers to Peter or Piers, perhaps Piers de Curry. The 15th-century Scottish chronicler Walter Bower identified the slain knight as such, and adding credibility to Bower's account is the fact that a like-named early 13th-century man, possibly an ancestor of the slain knight, is known to have been a vassal and tenant of the Steward of Scotland in the parish of Mauchline.) This entry confirms that at least some of the Scottish knights present were able to engage their foes on horseback. The supplies and usable ships lost on the beach were consequential in Haakom's decision to retreat from the area.

According to the saga, the Scots then withdrew from the beach and consolidated atop the mound abandoned by Ogmund's men, who had been beaten back by a detachment of men under Sir Robert Boyd (father of William Wallace's second in command). Minor skirmishing followed in which both sides attacked each other with arrows and stones. Before nightfall, the saga maintains that the Norwegians made one last determined assault, and forced the Scots from the mound, before making an orderly withdrawal to their ships. On the morning of 3 October, the Norwegians returned ashore to collect their dead and burn their beached vessels. For several days, Haakon's forces laid off the coast of Arran. After rendezvousing with the returning fleet that had plundered Lennox, Haakon's entire forces made for the Hebrides. At Mull he rewarded a number of his Norse-Gaelic vassals with grants of lands. By the end of October, the Norwegian fleet reached Orkney. In mid December, the Norwegian king fell ill and died at the Bishop's Palace, and was temporarily buried in nearby St Magnus Cathedral.

== Aftermath ==
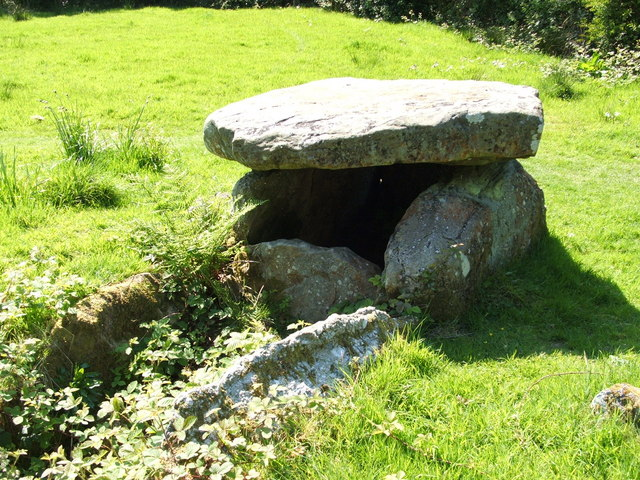
This Neolithic chambered cairn near Largs is sometimes known as "Haco's Tomb". Local tombs, such as this, were once believed to have been erected as grave markers for warriors slain during the battle.

The saga described the Norwegian campaign as a triumph. In reality, it had not achieved anything, though the expedition was not lost at Largs. Haakon simply retreated to Orkney to overwinter with his forces. He unexpectedly fell ill and died there before he had the chance to resume operations. The campaign had started too late, and the Scottish king had successfully prolonged negotiations to his own advantage. As the summer turned to autumn, and the royal envoys parleyed back and forth, Alexander III had further strengthened his forces in the defence of his realm and left Haakon's fleet to the mercy of the deteriorating weather. In the end, the Scottish realm had successfully defended itself from Norwegian might, and many of Haakon's Norse-Gaelic vassals had been reluctant to support the Norwegian cause. Within months of the abortive campaign, embassies were sent from Norway to discuss terms of peace. Meanwhile, Alexander III seized the initiative and made ready to punish the magnates who had supported Haakon, with at least three Scottish expeditions prepared against lords who had aided Haakon, the earls of Buchan, Mar and Alan Durward led an army to the Hebrides while Alexander III himself made ready a fleet to sail against Mann until the agreement of King Magnus of Mann and the Isles agreed to become Alexander’s vassal, which symbolised the collapse of Norse lordship in the Isles. By the end of the year the Hebrideans and Manx were forced to submit to the Scots. In 1266, almost three years after the battle, terms of peace were finally agreed upon between the Scottish and Norwegian kings. On 2 July 1266, with the conclusion of the Treaty of Perth, the Hebrides and Mann were leased to the King of Scots, in return for an annual payment. As it happened, Norwegian rule over the Hebrides would never return, with the Kingdom of Scotland eventually discontinuing their payments to the Norwegian crown. The treaty also entailed Scottish acceptance of Norwegian rule over Orkney and Shetland.

== Ramifications ==
The battle of Largs has been characterised by later historians as a great Scottish victory, but its strategic ramifications far outstripped its tactical cost as it involved only a small part of the Norwegian fleet. With his fleet and forces strewn about the Hebrides, Haakon may have intended to continue to campaign after spending the winter in Orkney and reconcentrating his forces, but he was taken ill in the dismal climate and died there. His illness is thought to have been caused in part by the stresses he endured in the long campaign and the difficult, damp environment of the Orkney Islands. The protracted diplomacy that had slowed his invasion had ultimately helped seal his own fate as well. With Haakon's death, his successor, Magnus Haakonarson, King of Norway, signed the Treaty of Perth three years after the battle, leasing Scotland's western seaboard to Alexander III in return for a yearly payment. This lease became permanent, but the Kingdom of Scotland eventually stopped paying the Norwegian crown for the islands when Norway became distracted by civil wars.

Although the Battle of Largs' contemporary records were largely lost to history with the loss of the Scottish archives in the wars of independence, it is for historians today to judge it by its ultimate, easily understood consequence: the end of a multi-century era of Norse invasion. The Battle greatly influenced clan history, especially that of the Boyds, Cunninghams, and Muirs, all of which point directly to participation in this battle as key to the grant of lands in Ayrshire. In the case of the Boyd family, its motto "Confido" (I Trust) was a direct quote from Alexander III at Largs. Alexander III depended on Boyd's detachment to keep the Norwegians off Gold Berry Hill and enveloped on the beach. The name "Gold Berry" was placed under their early heraldic devices.

== Historiography ==
The significance of the Battle was understood in Scotland at the time as it led to years of consolidation of royal authority. Unfortunately, many original sources and manuscripts were lost during the many years of fighting with the English, especially Edward I (see Jonathan Donald: 2019, Scotland, LE School of History, University of St Andrews, Alexander III, 1249–1286: First Among Equals). See also Acts of Alexander III King of Scots 1249 -1286 See also: The Chronicle of Melrose offers only a brief description, and does not record its location. It ascribes the campaign's failure more to the power of God than to that of the Scots. The battle is not recorded at all within the Chronicle of Mann, or any Irish source, and English sources show a similar lack of interest. But by the 14th and 15th centuries, the battle was being portrayed as part of an epic struggle between an invading force of Norwegians and an idealised Scottish king defending his realm. (Note: John of Fordun briefly described the storm which drove the Norwegians ashore as an act of God. About half a century later, Andrew of Wyntoun depicted the battle as a hard-fought and well-earned Scottish victory. Walter Bower declared that Saint Margaret miraculously intervened to defend the Scots against the Norwegians.) By the 17th century, the battle had lost its attributed significance, but in the 19th century it was rediscovered by antiquarians and historians who transformed it into a conflict of international importance. Although the battle's upsurge in popularity at this time may be due to the tapping of Largs' tourism potential, it was also influenced by the general heightening of interest in Scotland's history and culture. The battle became associated with Scotland's proud military past and linked to the great mediaeval victories of national heroes such as Wallace and Bruce. Most modern academics do not subscribe to such a view, though they regard the battle as a significant part of the failed Norwegian campaign. But even today, to the locals of Largs, the battle represents a glorious Scottish victory over invading Vikings.

== Commemoration ==
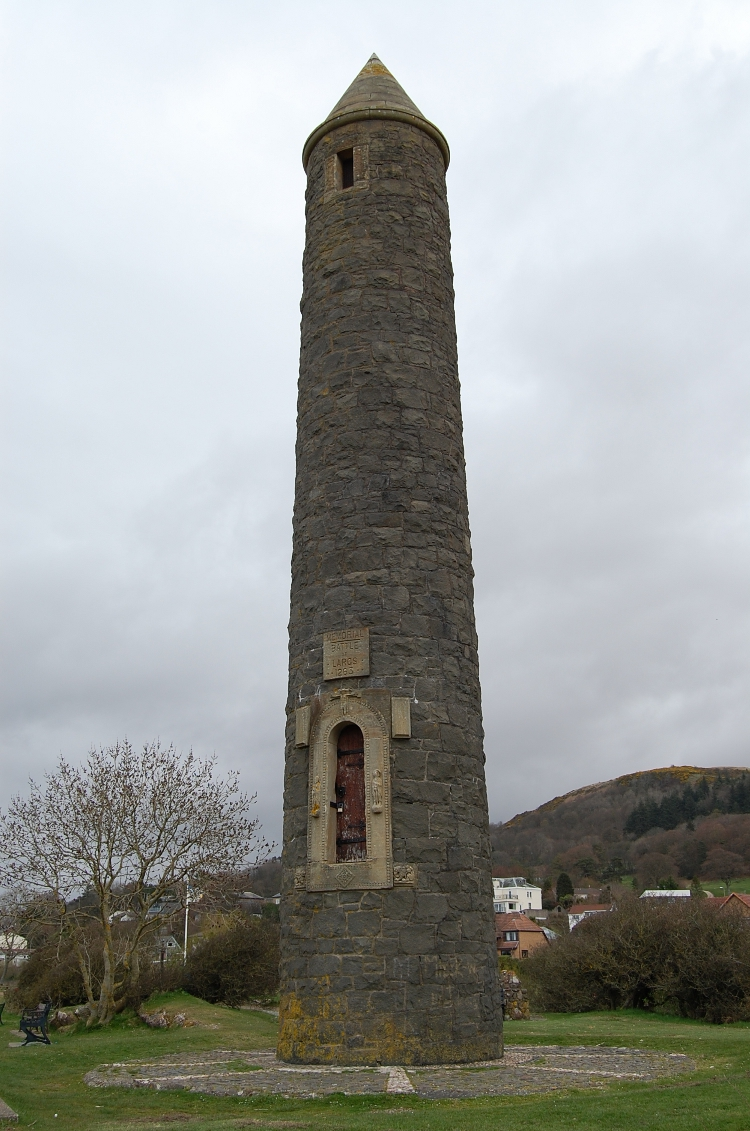
The Pencil stands about 1 mile (1.6 km) south of Largs, along a shoreline footpath.

On 12 July 1912, the battle was commemorated at Largs with the unveiling of a newly built stone tower. Popularly known as "The Pencil", this 70 feet (21 m) tall, pencil-shaped, conical-roofed tower is built out of ashlar blocks of whinstone. Constructed by architect James Sandyford Kay at the cost of nearly £300, the tower was modelled after mediaeval round towers at Abernethy and Brechin, which were thought (erroneously) to have been built as redoubts against Viking marauders. (Note: The door of the monument is a replica of that on the tower at Brechin. Not long after The Pencil was built, it was locally supposed that Viking warriors had once used the Largs tower to store their weapons.) The Pencil has been protected as a listed building since 1971, and stands about 1 mile (1.6 km) south of Largs, at grid reference NS 20762 57679, overlooking the local marina.

Although the monument marks the traditional battle site, it stands nowhere near the probable battle site. Its erroneous placement appears to be due to the discovery of prehistoric burials, consisting of both chambered tombs and cist burials. Nearby Bronze Age standing stones may have been interpreted as memorials to slain warriors, as was a nearby Neolithic tomb. The location of this tomb has led to the erroneous association between the battle and the two parks situated at grid reference NS 209587 and grid reference NS 207587. The Ordnance Survey also locates the battle too far south, at grid reference NS 207587. (Note: In the mid 19th century, a standing stone at Craigenmour, on Great Cumbrae, was said to have been a memorial raised for Norwegians killed at the battle. Today the stone is locally known as the "Druid's stone".)

The probable site of the mound upon which the Norwegians and Scots fought is not commemorated at all. Located at grid reference NS 2073 5932., and surrounded by a housing development, the mound is crowned by a 19th-century monument known as "The Three Sisters", which may have been erected by astronomer Thomas Brisbane. In recent years the battle site has been one of fifty battlefields researched by the Centre for Battlefield Archaeology and Historic Scotland for inclusion in the Inventory of Scottish Battlefields. The inventory, established in 2009, is intended to protect, preserve, and promote Scotland's most significant battlefields under the Scottish Historical Environment Policy. The site of the Battle of Largs was one of eleven investigated sites that did not meet the criteria for inclusion.

Each autumn since 1981, the village of Largs has hosted the Largs Viking Festival, founded to celebrate the battle and to encourage tourism. A re-enactment of the battle, held onsite at The Pencil, forms part of the festivities. The battle is the subject of John Galt's (d. 1839) The Battle of Largs: a Gothic Poem, written about 1804. Not regarded as one of Galt's better literary works, this poem was almost certainly based on James Johnstone's (d. 1798) The Norwegian Account of Haco's Expedition Against Scotland A.D. MCCLXIII, published in 1782. (Note: Johnstone's work is one of the first (albeit partial) English translations of an Icelandic saga. Galt, himself, stated that his poem was inspired by John Pinkerton's (d. 1826) controversial A Dissertation on the Origin and Progress of the Scythians or Goths, published in 1787, as well as Thomas Percy's (d. 1811) translation of Paul-Henri Mallet's Introduction à l'histoire du Dannemarc, published in 1770.) The battle is also commemorated within one of William Hole's (d. 1917) massive murals, which can be viewed in the foyer of the Scottish National Portrait Gallery.

== Bibliography ==
=== Primary ===
- Anderson, Alan Orr, ed. (1922), Early Sources of Scottish History: a.d. 500 to 1286, vol. 2, Oliver and Boyd.
- Laing, David, ed. (1872), The Orygynale Cronykil of Scotland, vol. 2, Edmonston and Douglas.
- Skene, William Forbes, ed. (1872a), John of Fordun's Chronicle of the Scottish Nation, vol. 1, Edmonston and Douglas.
- Skene, William Forbes, ed. (1872b), John of Fordun's Chronicle of the Scottish Nation, vol. 2, Edmonston and Douglas.
- Stevenson, Joseph, ed. (1835), Chronica de Mailros, Typis Societatis Edinburgensis.
- Neville, Grant and Cynthia, ed. (2012), Acts of Alexander III King of Scots 1249–1286 (Regesta Regnum Scottorum IV), Edinburgh University Press.

=== Secondary ===
- Alexander, Derek; Neighbour, Tim; Oram, Richard D. (2000), "Glorious victory? The battle of Largs, 2 October 1263", History Scotland, vol. 2, pp. 17–22.
- Barrow, Geoffrey Wallis Steuart (1981), Kingship and Unity: Scotland 1000–1306, University of Toronto Press, ISBN 0-8020-6448-5.
- Barrow, Geoffrey Wallis Steuart (1990), "The army of Alexander III's Scotland", in Reid, Norman H. (ed.), Scotland in the Reign of Alexander III, 1249–1286, John Donald, pp. 132–147, ISBN 0-85976218-1.
- Barrow, Geoffrey Wallis Steuart (2004). "Stewart family (per. c. 1110–c. 1350)". Oxford Dictionary of National Biography. Oxford Dictionary of National Biography. Vol. 1 (online ed.). Oxford University Press. doi:10.1093/ref:odnb/49411. (Subscription, Wikipedia Library access or UK public library membership required.)
- Beuermann, Ian (2010), "'Norgesveldet?' south of Cape Wrath?", in Imsen, Steinar (ed.), The Norwegian Domination and the Norse World c. 1100–c. 1400, Norgesveldt occasional papers (Trondheim studies in history), Tapir Academic Press, pp. 99–123, ISBN 978-82-519-2563-1.
- Boardman, Steve (2002), "Late medieval Scotland and the matter of Britain", in Cowan, Edward J.; Finlay, Richard J. (eds.), Scottish History: the Power of the Past, Edinburgh University Press, pp. 47–72, ISBN 978-0-7486-1420-2.
- Brown, Michael (2004), The Wars of Scotland, 1214–1371, The new Edinburgh history of Scotland, Edinburgh University Press, ISBN 978-0748612383.
- Close, Rob (1992), Ayrshire & Arran: an Illustrated Architectural Guide, Royal Incorporation of Architects in Scotland, ISBN 978-1873190067.
- Clunies Ross, Margaret; Collins, Amanda J. (2004). "Johnstone, James (d. 1798)". Oxford Dictionary of National Biography. Oxford Dictionary of National Biography (online January 2008 ed.). Oxford University Press. doi:10.1093/ref:odnb/14962. (Subscription, Wikipedia Library access or UK public library membership required.)
- Couper, Sarah (2004). "Pinkerton, John (1758–1826)". Oxford Dictionary of National Biography. Oxford Dictionary of National Biography (online May 2008 ed.). Oxford University Press. doi:10.1093/ref:odnb/22301. (Subscription, Wikipedia Library access or UK public library membership required.)
- Cowan, Edward J. (1990), "Norwegian Sunset – Scottish Dawn: Haakon IV and Alexander III", in Reid, Norman H. (ed.), Scotland in the Reign of Alexander III, 1249–1286, John Donald, pp. 103–131, ISBN 0-85976218-1.
- Crawford, Barbara Elizabeth (2001), "Scandinavia 1: to 1312", in Lynch, Michael (ed.), The Oxford Companion the Scottish History, Oxford University Press, pp. 556–558, ISBN 978-0-19-211696-3.
- Crawford, Robert (2009), Scotland's Books: a History of Scottish Literature, Oxford University Press, ISBN 978-0199888979.
- Cumming, Elizabeth S. (2004). "Hole, William Fergusson Brassey (1846–1917)". ]Oxford Dictionary of National Biography. Oxford Dictionary of National Biography (October 2009 ed.). Oxford University Press. doi:10.1093/ref:odnb/100749. (Subscription, Wikipedia Library access or UK public library membership required.)
- Derry, T. K. (2000), History of Scandinavia: Norway, Sweden, Denmark, Finland, and Iceland, University of Minnesota Press, ISBN 978-0-8166-3799-7.
- Doherty, H. F. (2011) [2007], "The Chronicle of Melrose Abbey. A stratigraphic edition, vol i: introduction and facsimile edition", in Broun, Dauvit; Harrison, Julian (eds.), The Innes Review, vol. 62, Woodbridge: Scottish History Society, pp. 101–107, doi:10.3366/inr.2011.0008, ISBN 978-0-906245-29-3, ISSN 0020-157X.
- Duncan, Archibald Alexander McBeth (1996), Scotland: the Making of the Kingdom, The Edinburgh History of Scotland, Mercat Press, ISBN 0-901824-83-6.
- Forte, Angelo; Oram, Richard D.; Pedersen, Frederik (2005), Viking Empires, Cambridge University Press, ISBN 978-0-521-82992-2.
- Historic Environment Scotland. "LARGS BATTLE MONUMENT ("THE PENCIL") (Category B Listed Building LB37177)".
- Magnusson, Magnus (2003), Scotland: the Story of a Nation, Grove Press, ISBN 978-0802139320.
- McDonald, Russell Andrew (1997), The Kingdom of the Isles: Scotland's Western Seaboard, c.1100–c.1336, Scottish Historical Monographs, Tuckwell Press, ISBN 1-898410-85-2.
- Murphy, Alan (2001), Edinburgh Handbook: the Travel Guide, Footprint Handbooks, ISBN 978-1900949972.
- Palmer, Roy (2004). "Percy, Thomas (1729–1811)". Oxford Dictionary of National Biography. Oxford Dictionary of National Biography. Vol. 1 (online May 2006 ed.). Oxford University Press. doi:10.1093/ref:odnb/21959. (Subscription, Wikipedia Library access or UK public library membership required.)
- Power, Rosemary (2005), "Meeting in Norway: Norse-Gaelic relations in the kingdom of Man and the Isles, 1090–1270" (PDF), Saga-Book, 29: 5, 66, ISSN 0305-9219, archived from the original (PDF) on 12 April 2013.
- Reid, Norman H. (1990), "Alexander III: the historiography of a myth", in Reid, Norman H. (ed.), Scotland in the Reign of Alexander III, 1249–1286, John Donald, pp. 183–213, ISBN 0-85976218-1.
- Reid, Norman H. (2004). "Alexander III (1241–1286)". Oxford Dictionary of National Biography. Oxford Dictionary of National Biography. Vol. 1 (online May 2011 ed.). Oxford University Press. doi:10.1093/ref:odnb/323. (Subscription, Wikipedia Library access or UK public library membership required.)
- Ritchie, Anna (1993), Viking Scotland, B. T. Batsford, ISBN 978-0713472257.
- Stringer, Keith John (2004). "Alexander II (1198–1249)". Oxford Dictionary of National Biography. Oxford Dictionary of National Biography (online ed.). Oxford University Press. doi:10.1093/ref:odnb/322. (Subscription, Wikipedia Library access or UK public library membership required.)
- Young, Alan (1990), "Noble families and political factions in the reign of Alexander III", in Reid, Norman H. (ed.), Scotland in the Reign of Alexander III, 1249–1286, John Donald, pp. 1–30, ISBN 0-85976218-1.
- Williams, Gareth (2007), "'These people were high-born and thought a lot of themselves': a family of Moddan of Dale", in Smith, Beverley Ballin; Taylor, Simon; Williams, Gareth (eds.), West Over the Sea: Studies in Scandinavian Sea-Borne Expansion and Settlement before 1300, The Northern World: North Europe and the Baltic c. 400–1700 a.d. Peoples, Economics and Cultures, vol. 31, Brill, pp. 129–152, ISBN 978-90-04-15893-1, ISSN 1569-1462
- Woolf, Alex (2004), "The age of sea-kings, 900–1300", in Omand, Donald (ed.), The Argyll Book, Birlinn, pp. 94–109, ISBN 978-1-84158-253-5.
