= Ayr Castle =

Castle in South Ayrshire, Scotland

- Ayr, Scotland

Site information
- Type: Tower
- Open to the public: Private
- Condition: Demolished

Location
- Shown within Scotland
- Location within Scotland
- Coordinates: 55.4650°N 4.6355°W
- Grid reference: grid reference NS33482218

Site history
- Built: 1197
- In use: Until 16th or 17th century
- Materials: Stone

Ayr Castle was a castle situated at Ayr in Scotland. Once considered a royal castle, nothing remains of it above ground.

== History ==
In 1197, the castle was built by King William the Lion of Scotland, who later in 1205 created a burgh at Ayr. The castle was captured by the Norwegian King Håkon Håkonsson and a substantial Norwegian army in 1263 which led to the Battle of Largs after which it returned to Scottish control. Robert the Bruce burned the castle in August 1298 in order to keep it out of the hands of the English. The castle in 1542 was garrisoned by French troops and appears to have been demolished before the Cromwellian occupation between 1650–1651.
