= List of wars involving Norway =

This is a list of wars involving the Kingdom of Norway.

Norwegian /allied victory
Norwegian / allied defeat
Another result *

*e.g. result unknown or indecisive/inconclusive, result of internal conflict inside Norway, status quo ante bellum, or a treaty or peace without a clear result.

== Viking Wars (793–1066) ==
Conflict	Combatant 1	Combatant 2	Results
Viking invasions of England (780–850)	Norse Vikings	Kingdom of England	Viking victory: Series of Viking attacks on Christian monasteries in the British Isles
Halfdan the Mild's revolt (ca. 813)	Halfdan the Mild	Kingdom of Denmark	Revolt successful: Denmark is expelled and Vestfold gains independence.
Battle of 839 (839)	Norse Vikings	Picts; Dál Riata	Norwegian Viking victory
Siege of Paris (845)	Norse Vikings	Francia	Viking victory: Viking plunder of Paris
Viking raid on Nekor (ca. 859)	Norse Vikings	Kingdom of Nekor	Viking victory: Vikings occupied Nekor for 8 days.
Great Heathen Army's invasion of England (865–878)	Norse Vikings; Norse–Gaels	Anglo-Saxon kingdoms: Wessex; Northumbria; Mercia; East Anglia; Kingdom of Strathclyde; Kingdom of Alba	Viking victory: Treaty of Wedmore; Establishment of Danelaw
Siege of Dumbarton (870)	Norse Vikings	Britons of Strathclyde	Viking victory: A fleet of 200 ships transported prisoners to Dublin.
Battle of Thimeon (880)	Norse Vikings	West Francia	Defeat: Viking Defeat
Battle of Saucourt-en-Vimeu (881)	Norse Vikings	West Francia	Defeat: 9000 Vikings slain; Vikings starts Raiding Lotharingia
Battle of Rochester (885)	Norwegian Vikings	Anglo-Saxons	Defeat: Viking Defeat
Siege of Paris (885–886)	Norse Vikings	West Francia	Stalemate: Paris successfully defended; Vikings granted passage of the Seine and 700 livres (pounds) of silver; Vikings raids continued into Burgundy
Battle of Leuven (891)	Norse Vikings	East Francia	Defeat: Death of Sigfried and Godfried
Æthelwold's Revolt (899–902)	Followers of Æthelwold ætheling Supported by: Vikings of Northumbria; Kingdom of East Anglia	Followers of Edward the Elder: Wessex; Mercia; Kent	Defeat: Victory for Edward the Elder
Battle of the Holme (902)	Norse Vikings	Followers of Edward the Elder: Wessex; Kent	Viking victory: Æthelwold killed; Æthelwold's Revolt ended
Siege of Chartres (911)	Norse Vikings	West Francia	Stalemate: West Frankish military victory; Treaty of Saint-Clair-sur-Epte; Rollo is granted lands in northern France in exchange for vassalage, religious conversion and pledge to defend the Seine's estuary from Viking raiders
Sack of Santiago de Compostela (968)	Norwegian Vikings	Kingdom of Galicia	Victory

== Unification of Norway (860–872) ==
Conflict	Combatant 1	Combatant 2	Results
Battle of Hakadal (ca. 860)	Vestfold	Álfheimr	Vestfold victory: Death of Hake Gandalfsson.
Battle of Orkdal (ca. 870)	Vestfold	Orkdal	Vestfold victory: Gryting subjects to Harald Fairhair.
First Battle of Solskjel (ca. 870)	Vestfold	Nordmøre; Romsdal	Vestfold victory: Death of the kings of Nordmøre and Romsdal.
Second Battle of Solskjel (ca. 870)	Vestfold	Sunnmøre; Firda	Vestfold victory: Rognvald Eysteinsson becomes the Jarl of Møre.
Götaland Campaign (ca. 870)	Vestfold	Geats	Vestfold victory: Guttorm Haraldsson becomes King of Rånrike.
Battle of Fjaler (ca. 870)	Earldom of Lade	Earldom of Sogn	Indecisive: Death of Håkon Grjotgardsson and Atle Mjove.
Battle of Hafrsfjord (872)	Vestfold	Hordaland; Rogaland; Agder	Vestfold victory: Norway unified under King Harald I.

== Kingdom of Norway (872–1397) ==
Conflict	Combatant 1	Combatant 2	Results
War between King Haakon the Good and the sons of Eirik Bloodaxe (953–961)	Haakon the Good	The sons of Eirik Bloodaxe; Denmark	The sons of Eirik Bloodaxe Victory: Death of Haakon the Good; Harald Greycloak becomes king
Ladejarl-Fairhair succession wars (970–1030)	Fairhair dynasty	Ladejarls; Denmark	Victory: Magnus the Good takes back the Norwegian throne in 1035
Rebellion of Harald Bluetooth (974)	Kingdom of Denmark; Kingdom of Norway	Holy Roman Empire; Norwegian Rebels	German and Norwegian rebel victory: Hedeby under German occupation from 974 to 981
Norwegian-Jomsviking War (986)	Kingdom of Norway	Denmark; Jomsvikings	Victory: Danish fleet defeated
Battle of Maldon (991)	Kingdom of Norway	Anglo-Saxons	Victory: First English payment of Danegeld
Norwegian Raid of the Rus (997)	Norwegian Vikings	Kievan Rus'	Victory: Ladoga destroyed
Battle of Svolder (999/1000)	Kingdom of Norway	Denmark; Sweden; Earls of Lade	Defeat: Death of Olaf Tryggvason
Battle of Thetford (1004)	Norway; Anglo-Saxons	Kingdom of Denmark	Anglo-Norwegian Victory
Battle at Herdaler (1007/08)	Kingdom of Norway	Finns of Herdaler	Defeat: Olaf Haraldson got almost killed and lost many men
Olav II's landing in Osilia (1008)	Kingdom of Norway	Osilians	Victory: The Osilians are defeated
Battle of Ringmere (1010)	(Norway) Norway; Anglo-Saxons	Danish Vikings	Victory: Ango-Norwegian victory
Swedish-Norwegian War (1015–1018)	Kingdom of Norway	Kingdom of Sweden	Victory: Olav II reconquers any land lost to Sweden excluding Jämtland, Härjedalen and Hälsingland, in which Jämtland and Härjedalen wouldn't be recorded as under Norwegian overlordship until 1111.
Olav II's conquest of Norway (1015–1016): Battle of Nesjar; Raid on Denmark	Kingdom of Norway	Kingdom of Sweden; Kingdom of Denmark; Earldom of Orkney	Victory: The territorial changes following the Battle of Svolder are reversed, barring Jämtland, which would remain under Swedish overlordship until the 12th century.
Cnut the Great's invasion of England (1016)	Kingdom of Denmark; Kingdom of Norway	Kingdom of England	Dano-Norwegian victory: Personal union formed between Denmark and England in 1018.; Following Edmund's death on 30 November, Cnut ascends to the throne as the sole king of England.
Battle of the Helgeå (1026)	(Norway) Kingdom of Norway; Sweden	North Sea Empire	Defeat: Cnut the Great dominates Scandinavia
Battle of Boknafjorden (1028)	Kingdom of Norway	Erling Skjalgsson	Victory: Death of Erling Skjalgsson
Cnut's invasion of Norway (1028–1029)	Kingdom of Norway	North Sea Empire; Norwegian chieftains	Danish and Norwegian chieftain victory: Norway conquered by King Cnut; King Olaf II was driven into exile to Kievan Rus
Battle of Stiklestad (1030)	Olaf II	Peasant Army	Peasant victory: Death of Olaf II
Tryggvi the Pretender's invasion of Norway (1033)	North Sea Empire	Tryggvi the Pretender	Invasion failed: Death of Tryggvi the Pretender
Norwegian-Wendish War (1043)	Kingdom of Norway	Wends: Danish Rebels	Victory: Destruction the Viking fort Jomsborg, possibly to destroy the Danish competitors to the throne. Plundering of the Wendish town of Jumne.
Magnus the Good's conquest of Denmark (1043–1045)	Kingdom of Norway	Denmark: Wends	Victory: Denmark reconquered; Rebellion crushed; Magnus the Good is kept king over both Norway and Denmark; Sweyn Estridsson flees to Sweden
Invasions of Denmark (1048–1064)	Kingdom of Norway	Denmark	Stalemate: Peace agreement, mutual recognition and withdrawal
Swedish–Norwegian War (1063) (1063/64)	Kingdom of Norway	Haakon Ivarsson; Kingdom of Sweden	Victory: Hardrada defeats Haakon Ivarsson Jarl; Norwegian authority strengthened in the Uplands
Revolt in the Uplands (1064–1065)	Kingdom of Norway	Revolting farmers	Victory: Small farms and villages burned down by Hardrada. Uplands becomes more integrated into Norway
Invasion of England (1066): Battle of Fulford; Battle of Stamford Bridge	Kingdom of Norway	England	Defeat: Death of King Harald Hardrada
War between Magnus Barefoot and Haakon Toresfostre (1095)	(Norway) Magnus Barefoot	(Norway) Haakon Toresfostre	Magnus Barefoot victory: Magnus Barefoot becomes the sole King of Norway
Magnus's raids on Halland (1096)	Norway	Denmark	Victory
First Irish Sea Campaign (1098)	Kingdom of Norway	England Irish Kingdoms	Victory: Norwegian reconquest in the Irish Sea
Swedish–Norwegian War (1099–1101)	Kingdom of Norway	Sweden	Inconclusive: Through the marriage of Magnus Barefoot and Margaret Fredkulla, Inge's daughter, Norway gains the land of Dalsland. However, due to the marriage being childless, Dalsland never becomes integrated into Norway, and it's returned to Sweden after Magnus died in 1103
Second Irish Sea Campaign (1101/1102–1103)	Kingdom of Norway	England Irish Kingdoms	Defeat: Norway loses control of the Irish Sea region
Norwegian Crusade (1107–1110)	Kingdom of Norway; Kingdom of Jerusalem; Republic of Venice Supported by: Byzantine Empire	Fatimid Caliphate; Almoravid Empire; Taifa of Badajoz; Taifa of Majorca; Barbary pirates of Majorca	Victory: Lordship of Sidon created
Civil war era in Norway (1130–1240)	Birkebeiners	Baglers	Birkebeiner victory: Håkon Håkonsson became king.
Slavic raid on Kungahälla (1135)	(Kingdom of Norway (872–1397)) Kingdom of Norway	Slavic Pomeranians	Defeat: Pomeranian victory
Valdemar's First Invasion of Norway (1165)	(Kingdom of Norway (872–1397)) Kingdom of Norway: Baglers	(Medieval Denmark) Kingdom of Denmark	Victory: Danes retreated back to Denmark
Valdemar's Second Invasion of Norway (1168)	(Kingdom of Norway (872–1397)) Kingdom of Norway: Baglers	(Medieval Denmark) Kingdom of Denmark	Victory: Danish Leidang fleet forced to retreat.
Age of the Sturlungs (1220–1264)	(Kingdom of Norway (872–1397)) Kingdom of Norway; Icelandic Gothis	Commonwealth Gothis	Old Covenant: Termination of the Icelandic Commonwealth.; Iceland is integrated into the Kingdom of Norway
Campaign in Värmland (1225)	Kingdom of Norway	Värmland	Inconclusive: Treaty of Lödöse
Battle of the Neva (1240)	Sweden; Finns; Tavastia; Kingdom of Norway	Novgorod Republic; Karelians	Defeat: Sweden fails to capture Staraya Ladoga
Halland War (1256–1257)	Norway	Denmark	Victory: Norway renounces its claim on Halland; Ingeborg marries Magnus VI of Norway
Scottish–Norwegian War (1262–1266)	Kingdom of Norway	Scotland	Indecisive: Treaty of Perth; Hebrides and Isle of Man bought from Norway for 4,000 marks to become part of Scotland; Norwegian sovereignty recognised over Orkney and Shetland
War of the Outlaws (1289–1295)	Norway; Danish outlaws	Denmark	Victory: North Halland ceded to Kingdom of Norway
Second Swedish Brother's Feud (1304–1310)	Norway (1304–1308); Duke Eric and Valdemar	Norway (1308–1310); Denmark; Birger Magnusson	Victory: Death of Duke Eric and Valdemar
Sacking of Bergen (1393)	Norway	Victual Brothers	Defeat: Bergen successfully sacked

== Norwegian Crusades (1107–1188) ==
Conflict	Combatant 1	Combatant 2	Results
Norwegian Crusade (1107–1110)	Kingdom of Norway; Kingdom of Jerusalem; Republic of Venice Supported by: Byzantine Empire	Fatimid Caliphate; Almoravid Empire; Taifa of Badajoz; Taifa of Majorca; Barbary pirates of Majorca	Victory: Lordship of Sidon created
Sack of Santiago de Compostela (1109)	Kingdom of Norway	Kingdom of Galicia	Victory: Santiago de Compostela successfully sacked
Raid on Sintra (1109)	Kingdom of Norway	Almoravid Empire; Taifa of Badajoz	Victory: Raid successful
Siege of Lisbon (1109)	Kingdom of Norway	Almoravid Empire; Taifa of Badajoz	Victory: Siege successful; Norway takes control of Lisbon; Mass conversion of local Muslims
Sack of Alcácer do Sal (1109)	Kingdom of Norway	Almoravid Empire; Taifa of Badajoz	Victory
Battle of Gibraltar Strait (1109)	Kingdom of Norway	Almoravid Empire; Taifa of Badajoz	Victory
Battle of Formentera (1109)	Kingdom of Norway	Almoravid Empire; Taifa of Majorca; Barbary pirates	Victory Norway takes control of Formentera
Battle of Ibiza (1109)	Kingdom of Norway	Almoravid Empire; Taifa of Majorca; Barbary pirates	Victory Norway takes control of Ibiza
Battle of Menorca (1109)	Kingdom of Norway	Almoravid Empire; Taifa of Majorca; Barbary pirates	Victory
Siege of Sidon (1109)	Kingdom of Norway; Kingdom of Jerusalem; Republic of Venice	Fatimid Caliphate	Victory: Lordship of Sidon created
Kalmar Crusade (1123)	Kingdom of Norway	Norse pagans	Victory: The pagans converted to Christianity
Norwegian Crusade (1152–1155)	(Kingdom of Norway (872–1397)) Kingdom of Norway: Earldom of Orkney	Unknown Muslims	Victory: Crusaders are victorious.
Erik Sigurdson's expedition to Estonia (1185–1188)	(Kingdom of Norway (872–1397)) Kingdom of Norway	Pagan Estonians	Victory: Norwegians plunder pagan land from 1185 to 1188

== Civil war era (1130–1240) ==
Conflict	Combatant 1	Combatant 2	Results
Battle of Fyrileiv (1134)	Hardrada dynasty: Magnus the Blind	Gille dynasty: Harald Gille	Hardrada Dynasty Victory: Harald Gille flees to Denmark
Battle of Bergen (1135)	Hardrada dynasty: Magnus the Blind (POW)	Gille dynasty: Harald Gille	Gille Dynasty Victory: Magnus deposed as king and taken prisoner
Battle of Minne (1137)	Hardrada dynasty: Magnus the Blind	Gille dynasty: Inge Haraldsson; Tjostolv Ålesson	Gille Dynasty Victory
Battle of Holmengrå (1139)	Hardrada dynasty: Magnus the Blind †; Sigurd Slembe (executed)	Gille dynasty: Inge Haraldsson; Sigurd Haraldsson	Decisive Gille Victory: Magnus killed and Sigurd executed
Eystein II expedition to England (1150s)	(Kingdom of Norway (872–1397)) Norway	England	Victory
Battle of Oslo (Ekeberg) (1161)	Gille dynasty: Haakon II	Gille dynasty: Inge Haraldsson †	Victory for Haakon II: Inge killed
Battle of Sekken (1162)	Hardrada dynasty: Magnus Erlingsson; Erling Skakke	Gille dynasty: Haakon II	Hardrada Dynasty Victory: Haakon II killed; Magnus Erlingsson praised as king at the Øreting in Trøndelag
Battle of Re (1163)	Hardrada dynasty: Magnus Erlingsson; Erling Skakke	Gille dynasty: Sigurd Markusfostre; Earl Sigurd Hallvardsson	Hardrada Dynasty Victory: Earl Sigurd Hallvardsson killed
Dano-Norwegian War (1164–1170): Battle of Djurså	(Kingdom of Norway (872–1397)) Norway: Magnus Erlingsson; Erling Skakke	(Medieval Denmark) Denmark	Victory
Battle of Re (1177)	Hardrada dynasty: Magnus Erlingsson	Birkebeiner Party: Eystein Meyla †	Hardrada Dynasty Victory: Eystein Meyla killed
Conquest of Jemtland (1178)	(Kingdom of Norway (872–1397)) Norway: Sverre Sigurdsson (Birkebeiner)	Jemtland	Victory: Norway takes control of Jemtland
Battle of Kalvskinnet (1179)	Hardrada dynasty: Erling Skakke †	Birkebeiner Party: Sverre Sigurdsson	Birkebeiner Victory: Erling Skakke as earl and chancellor of Norway fell together with 10 lendmen and nearly 60 hirdmen
Battle of Ilevollene (1180)	Hardrada dynasty: Magnus Erlingsson	Birkebeiner Party: Sverre Sigurdsson	Birkebeiner Victory: Magnus suffers huge losses and eventually flees to Denmark; Sverre Sigurdsson gains control of all Norway
Battle of Fimreite (1184)	Hardrada dynasty: Magnus Erlingsson †	Birkebeiner Party: Sverre Sigurdsson	Birkebeiner Victory: Throne usurped by Sverre
Battle of Florvåg (1194)	(Kingdom of Norway (872–1397)) Norway: Birkebeiner Party; Sverre Sigurdsson; Bård Guttormsson †	Eyjarskeggjar party (supported by Earldom of Orkney): Sigurd Magnusson †; Hallkjell Jonsson †; Olav Jarlsmåg †	Victory: Revolt put down; Shetland permanently ceded away from the Earldom of Orkney to Norway
Battle of Tønsberg (ca. 1200)	Birkebeiner Party: Sverre Sigurdsson; Bård Guttormsson †	Bagler Party: Philip Simonsson	Birkebeiner Victory
Peasant rebellion in Innherad (1213-1214)	Birkebeiner Party: Inge Bårdsson	Peasants: Haakon the Crazy (blamed for the uprising and an attempt on Inge's life)	Victory for Inge Bårdsson: Later in 1214, Haakon dies, and Inge inherits Vestlandet, which Haakon ruled.
Haakon Haakonsson's campaign in Scotland (1230) (1230)	(Kingdom of Norway (872–1397)) Norway	Kingdom of Scotland	Victory
Battle of Oslo (1240) (1240)	(Kingdom of Norway (872–1397)) Norway: Haakon IV	Vårbelgers: Skule Bårdsson (surrendered)	Victory: End of the Norwegian Civil War era; Start of the Golden age for Norway

== House of Bjälbo (1319–1387) ==
Conflict	Combatant 1	Combatant 2	Results
Campaign against Ingeborg (1323)	Swedish-Norwegian Union	Ingeborg of Norway	Peace of Skara: Ingeborg is forced to exchange Axvall for the unfortified Dåvö in Västmanland
Raid on Bjarkøy (1326)	Norway	Karelians	Defeat: Karelians burns down the residence of Erling Vidkunnsson
First Norwegian Noble Rising (1331–1333)	Swedish-Norwegian Union	Norwegian nobles	Norwegian nobles victory: The Norwegian Royal Seal is given to the Norwegian nobels; Ivar Ogmundsson is appointed as Royal Seal holder
Second Norwegian Noble Rising (1338–1339)	Swedish-Norwegian Union	Norwegian nobles	Norwegian nobles victory: King Magnus VII made an agreement with the Norwegian nobles
Kalundborg War (1341–1343): Siege of Kalundborg; Battle of Blidebro	Swedish-Norwegian Union	Denmark Lübeck; Rostock; Hamburg; Stralsund; Wismar; Greifswald	Victory: Valdemar IV admits his sale of Scania, Blekinge, and Halland to Sweden-Norway; Copenhagen Castle is given back to Denmark
Magnus's war against Russia (1348–1351)	Swedish-Norwegian Union	Novgorod	Truce of Dorprat: Swedish-Norwegian success in the beginning; Swedish-Norwegian failure to keep Nöteborg
Danish-Hanseatic War (1361–1370)	First Phase (1361–1365): Hanseatic League; Gotland; Lubeck; Stralsund; Kingdom of Norway; Kingdom of Sweden; Second Phase (1367–1370): Confederation of Cologne; Towns in Holland; Towns in Zeeland; Hanseatic League; Towns in Prussia; Towns in Livonia; Lubeck; Stralsund; Rostock; Teutonic Order; Kingdom of Sweden; County of Holstein; Duchy of Mecklenburg; Danish Noble Rebels	First Phase (1361–1365) Kingdom of Denmark; Second Phase (1367–1370); Kingdom of Denmark; Kingdom of Norway	First Phase: Danish Victory Second Phase: Hanseatic victory: The Hanseatic League gains control over several forts in Scania; The Hanseatic League became one of the most powerful military and economic powers in Northern Europe
First war against Albert of Mecklenberg (1363–1364)	Swedish-Norwegian Union	Mecklenburg: (History of Sweden (800–1521)) Swedish Nobles; (History of Sweden (800–1521)) Swedish Rebels	Treaty of Jönköping (1364): First Swedish-Norwegian union dissolved; Västergötland, Värmland and Dalsland ceded to Magnus Eriksson and Haakon VI as personal fiefdoms
Second war against Albert of Mecklenberg (1363–1371)	(Kingdom of Norway (872–1397)) Norway; Denmark (History of Sweden (800–1521)) Swedish Loyalists; Saxe-Lauenburg	Mecklenburg (History of Sweden (800–1521)) Swedish Nobles (History of Sweden (800–1521)) Swedish Rebels; Teutonic Order; Confederation of Cologne: Towns in Holland; Towns in Zeeland; Hanseatic League; Towns in Prussia; Towns in Livonia; Lubeck; Stralsund; Rostock	Treaty of Edsvik (1371): Västergötland, Värmland and Dalsland ceded to Magnus Eriksson and Haakon VI as personal fiefdoms; Magnus Eriksson is deposed; Albert becomes king of Sweden. Afterwards Haakon continues ruling Norway until his death in 1380; End of the union between Sweden and Norway

== Kalmar Union (1397–1523) ==
Conflict	Combatant 1	Combatant 2	Results
War with the Victual Brothers (1392–1398)	Kalmar Union	Victual Brothers	Victory: Formation of the Kalmar Union.
Dano-Hanseatic War (1426–1435)	Kalmar Union	House of Schaumburg; Hanseatic League	Defeat: Treaty of Vordingborg
Amund Sigurdsson Bolt Rebellion (1436)	Amund Sigurdsson Bolt	Kalmar Union	Ceasefire
Graatop Rebellion (1438)	Hallvard Graatop	Kalmar Union	Rebellion Suppressed
Novgorodian-Norwegian war (1445)	(Kingdom of Norway (872–1397)) Norway	Novgorod Republic	Victory
Krummedige-Tre Rosor feud (1448 - 1502)	Krummedige family Denmark	Tre Rosor family Sweden	Krummedige victory: The male Tre Rosor line in Norway becomes extinct.; Norwegian monarchy strengthened; Prince Christian maintains control over Norway.
War of the Norwegian Succession (1448–1453)	Denmark; Pro-Danish Norwegians	Sweden; Pro-Swedish Norwegians	Pro-Danish Victory: Christian I becomes king of Norway; Charles I relinquish the throne of Norway
Assault on Karlsborg (1456)	(Kingdom of Norway (872–1397)) Norway	Sweden	Defeat
Dano-Swedish War (1501–1512)	Kalmar Union	Sweden; Free City of Lübeck; Norwegian rebels	Victory: Treaty of Malmö (1512)
Alvsson Rebellion (1501–1504)	Knut Alvsson (until 1502); Nils Ravaldsson (from 1502); Sweden	Kalmar Union	Rebellion Suppressed: Dano-Norwegian ties solidified
Herlaug Hovudfat's Rebellion (1507–1508)	Herlaug Hovudfat	Kalmar Union	Rebellion Suppressed
Orm Eriksson Tax Revolt (1519)	Orm Eriksson; Jon Eilivsson	Kalmar Union	Rebellion Suppressed
Swedish War of Liberation (1521–1523)	Kalmar Union	Sweden; Free City of Lübeck	Defeat: Treaty of Malmö, dissolution of the Kalmar Union.

== Transitional period (1523–1537) ==
Conflict	Combatant 1	Combatant 2	Results
Christian II's invasion of Norway (1531–1532)	Christian II	Frederick I Sweden	Invasion failed: Christian II imprisoned
Olav Engelbrektsson's Rebellion (1536–1537)	Catholics	Protestants; Denmark	Protestant Victory: Creation of Denmark-Norway

== Denmark–Norway (1537–1800) ==
Conflict	Combatant 1	Combatant 2	Results
Icelandic Reformation (1538–1550)	Icelandic Protestants; Denmark–Norway	Icelandic Catholics	Protestant Victory: Jón Arason defeated and captured; Collapse of Catholicism in Iceland
Peasant's Rebellion in Telemark (1540)	Denmark–Norway	Norwegian peasants	Rebellion suppressed
Peasant's Rebellion in Agder (1540–1541)	Denmark–Norway	Norwegian peasants	Rebellion suppressed
Dacke War (1542)	Sweden (Holy Roman Empire) Landsknechte; Denmark-Norway	Småland Peasants under Nils Dacke Östergötland peasant militia	Victory: Royal power strengthened; No further civil wars or major uprisings in Scandinavia
Italian War of 1542–1546 (1542)	France; Ottoman Empire: Regency of Algiers; Jülich-Cleves-Berg; Denmark-Norway	Holy Roman Empire; Saxony; Brandenburg; Spain (Kingdom of England) England	Status quo ante bellum: Treaty of Speyer (1544); Holy Roman Emperor Charles V recognized Christian III as the rightful king of Denmark and Norway
Livonian War (1558–1583)	Livonian Confederation; Polish–Lithuanian Commonwealth; Denmark-Norway Kingdom of Sweden; Zaporozhian Cossacks; Principality of Transylvania	Tsardom of Russia; Qasim Khanate; Kingdom of Livonia	Victory: Sweden gains Estonia; Livonia, Courland and Semigallia to Poland–Lithuania; Denmark–Norway gains Ösel
Campaign of 1559 (1559)	Denmark-Norway	Dithmarschen	Victory: Conquest of Dithmarschen
Northern Seven Years' War (1563–1570)	Denmark-Norway; Free City of Lübeck Poland–Lithuania	Sweden	Status quo ante bellum: Treaty of Stettin (1570)
Polish–Swedish War (1563–1568)	Poland–Lithuania; Denmark–Norway; Lübeck	Sweden	Status quo ante bellum
Dano-Norwegian attack on Poland (1571): Naval battle near Hel	Denmark-Norway	Polish–Lithuanian Commonwealth	Victory: The Polish–Lithuanian Commonwealth Navy was reduced to half of its previous strength
Danzig rebellion (1575–1577)	City of Danzig; Denmark-Norway	Polish–Lithuanian Commonwealth	Peace: Danzig withstanded the siege; Danzig law confirmed; Danzig had to pay 200,000 złotys
The First Turkish Abductions (1607)	Denmark-Norway	Ottoman Empire	Defeat: Abduction of many Icelanders and Faroese people
Kalmar War (1611–1613)	Denmark-Norway	Sweden	Victory: Treaty of Knäred (1613)
Thirty Years' War (1625–1629)	Protestant States and Allies Sweden; Kingdom of France; Bohemia; Denmark-Norway (1625–1629); Saxony; Dutch Republic; Electorate of the Palatinate; Brunswick-Lüneburg; England; Scotland; Brandenburg-Prussia; Transylvania; Hungarian Anti-Habsburg Rebels; Zaporozhian Cossacks; Ottoman Empire	Roman Catholic States and Allies Holy Roman Empire: Catholic League; Habsburg Monarchy Austria; Bavaria; Spain and its possessions Denmark-Norway (1643–1645)	Defeat: Peace of Westphalia; Habsburg supremacy curtailed; Rise of the Bourbon dynasty; Rise of the Swedish Empire; Decentralization of the Holy Roman Empire; Franco-Spanish War until 1659; Substantial decline in the power and influence of the Catholic Church
The Second Turkish Abductions (1627)	Denmark-Norway	Ottoman Empire	Defeat: Abduction of many Icelanders
Torstenson War (1643–1645)	Denmark-Norway; Holy Roman Empire	Sweden; Dutch Republic	Defeat: Treaty of Brömsebro (1645)
Second Northern War (1657–1660)	Habsburg monarchy Poland–Lithuania; Russia (1656–58); Brandenburg-Prussia; Dutch Republic; Denmark-Norway	Sweden; Brandenburg-Prussia; Transylvania; Ukrainian Cossacks; Wallachia; Moldavia	Defeat: Treaty of Roskilde (February 26, 1658)
Dano-Swedish War (1657–1658)	Denmark-Norway (Polish–Lithuanian Commonwealth) Poland–Lithuania	(yes) Swedish Empire	Defeat: Decisive Swedish victory; Treaty of Roskilde/Treaty of Taastrup
Dano-Swedish War (1658–1660)	Denmark-Norway; Dutch Republic; Brandenburg-Prussia; Poland–Lithuania; Habsburg Monarchy	(yes) Swedish Empire	Victory: Treaty of Copenhagen (1660)
Second Anglo-Dutch War (1665–1667): Battle of Vågen	Dutch Republic; Denmark-Norway; Kingdom of France	Kingdom of England; Bishopric of Münster	Victory: Treaty of Breda (1667)
Second Swedish War on Bremen (1666)	Bremen; Electorate of Cologne; Brunswick-Lüneburg; Denmark-Norway; Electorate of Brandenburg; Dutch Republic	Sweden	Draw: Treaty of Habenhausen
Scanian War (1675–1679)	Denmark-Norway; Dutch Republic; Holy Roman Empire; Brandenburg	Sweden; Kingdom of France	Status quo ante bellum: Treaty of Fontainebleau (1679)
Siege of Hamburg (1689) (1689)	Denmark–Norway: supported by Kingdom of France	Hamburg; Brunswick-Lüneburg; Brandenburg-Prussia	Peace agreement: Dano-Norwegian withdrawal; Hamburg pays 300,000 thalers as compensation to Denmark-Norway
Great Northern War (1700–1720)	Tsardom of Russia; Electorate of Saxony; Poland–Lithuania; Cossack Hetmanate; Prussia (Province of Hanover) Hanover; Great Britain; Denmark–Norway	Sweden; Holstein-Gottorp; Poland–Lithuania; Ottoman Empire	Victory: Treaty of Frederiksborg (1720)
Rákóczi's War of Independence (1703–1711)	Holy Roman Empire: Austria; Prussia; Margraviate of Baden; Serbs from Vojvodina; Transylvanian Saxons; Kingdom of Croatia; Royalists; Denmark–Norway	Kuruc forces (Kingdom of Hungary); Principality of Transylvania; Kingdom of France	Victory: Rebellion suppressed
Strilekrigen (1765)	Denmark-Norway	Norwegian peasants	Rebellion suppressed
Danish–Algerian War (1769–1772)	Denmark–Norway	Dey of Algiers	Defeat: Punitive expedition unsuccessful.; Denmark–Norway pays higher tribute than before
Royal Life Guards' Mutiny (1771)	Denmark-Norway	Royal Life Guard	Execution of Struensee
Lofthusreisingen (1786–1787)	Denmark-Norway	Norwegian peasants	Rebellion suppressed
Theatre War (1788–1789)	Denmark-Norway	Sweden	Inconclusive: Status quo ante bellum
Action of 16 May 1797 (1797)	Denmark-Norway	Ottoman Empire (de jure): Eyalet of Tripolitania	Inconclusive
Lærdal Rebellion (1800–1802)	Denmark-Norway	Norwegian peasants	Rebellion suppressed

== Colonial Wars (1600–1800) ==
Conflict	Combatant 1	Combatant 2	Results
Conquest of Koneswaram Temple (1618–1620)	Denmark-Norway; Kingdom of Kandy	Portuguese Ceylon	Defeat: Failure to monopolize Ceylon; Danish India established
Roland Crappé's raids on Portuguese colonies (1619)	Denmark-Norway; Kingdom of Kandy; Supported by: Thanjavur Nayak kingdom	Portuguese Ceylon Portuguese India	Defeat
Action of 19 February 1619 (1619)	Denmark-Norway	French pirates France	Victory: Dano-Norwegian Victory; French ships conquered
Siege of Dansborg (1624) (1624)	Danish India	Thanjavur Nayak	Victory: Thanjavur recognizes Tranquebar as Danish
Dano-Mughal War (1642–1698)	Denmark–Norway	Mughal Empire	Peace treaty: Dannemarksnagore ceded to Danish India for 30,000 rupees to be paid over ten years
Conflict between Willem Leyel and Bernt Pessart (1644)	Danish India	(Denmark–Norway) Leyel loyalist (Dutch East India Company) Dutch Coromandel English Madras (Portuguese Empire) Portuguese Carical Supported by: Thanjavur Nayak	Willem victory: Willem Leyel becomes governor of Tranquebar
Siege of Dansborg (1644) (1644)	Denmark-Norway	Thanjavur Nayak kingdom	Inconclusive
Sieges of Tranquebar (1655–1669) (1655–1669)	Danish India	Thanjavur Nayak kingdom	Victory: Villages of Poreiar, Tillali and Erikutanchery ceded to the Danes
Dano-Dutch Colonial War in Guinea (1660–1664)	Denmark–Norway; Kingdom of England; Fetu tribe	Dutch Republic	Victory: Anglo-Danish Conquest of Cape Coast
Gã-Akwamu War (1678)	Ga-Adangbe; Denmark-Norway	Akwamu	Victory: Assault reppeled
Slave insurrection on St. John (1733–1734)	Denmark–Norway: Sankt Jan	Rebel slaves	Victory: Rebellion suppressed
Danish-Dutch conflict over Greenland (1739)	Denmark–Norway	Dutch whalers	Victory: Dutch presence on Greenland collapses
Cattle War (1756)	Denmark–Norway	Thanjavur Maratha kingdom	Defeat: Punitive expedition unsuccessful
Siege and Occupation of Serampore (1763)	Denmark–Norway	Great Britain	Defeat: Serampore temporarily occupied by Great Britain
Sagbadre War (1784)	Denmark-Norway Ada-Danish Alliance: Danish West India Company; Little Popo; Ada; Accra; Akuapem; Akwapim; Ga; Krobo	Anlo Confederacy	Victory: Return of territory previously acquired by Anlo from the Alliance; Construction of Fort Prinzenstein

== Napoleonic Wars (1800–1814) ==
Conflict	Combatant 1	Combatant 2	Results
Napoleonic Wars (1800–1815)	France; Ottoman Empire	United Kingdom; Sweden; Russia; Austrian Empire; Prussia; Spain; Portugal; Ottoman Empire (until 1803); United Kingdom of the Netherlands	Defeat: Congress of Vienna (1815)
English Wars (1801, 1807–1814)	Denmark–Norway French Empire; Spain	United Kingdom Sweden	Defeat: Treaty of Kiel; Denmark joined the anti-Napoleonic alliance; Frederick VI of Denmark cedes Norway to Charles XIII of Sweden
Franco-Swedish War (1805–1810)	(First French Empire) French Empire; Spain Until 1808; Holland; Russian Empire (1808–09); Denmark–Norway (1808–09)	Sweden; (United Kingdom of Great Britain and Ireland) United Kingdom; (Kingdom of Prussia) Prussia; Russian Empire (–1807); Austrian Empire; Saxony	Victory: Treaty of Paris (1810); Sweden regains Swedish Pomerania; Sweden integrates the Continental System
Gunboat War (1807–1814)	Denmark–Norway	United Kingdom	Defeat: Treaty of Kiel; Dissolution of Denmark-Norway
Dano-Swedish War (1808–09) (1808–1809)	Denmark–Norway; France	Sweden; United Kingdom	Stalemate: Return to Status quo ante bellum
Jørgen Jørgensen's Revolution (1809)	Denmark-Norway; United Kingdom	Iceland	Victory: Imprisonment of Jørgen Jørgensen
Dano-Swedish War (1813–1814) (1813–1814)	Denmark-Norway (First French Empire) French Empire; Duchy of Warsaw	Sweden; Russian Empire; United Kingdom; Prussia; Hanover (Grand Duchy of Mecklenburg-Schwerin) Mecklenburg-Schwerin	Defeat: Treaty of Kiel
War of the Sixth Coalition (1813–1814)	First French Empire Napoleonic Italy; Kingdom of Naples; Duchy of Warsaw (Denmark–Norway) Denmark–Norway; Confederation of the Rhine	Russian Empire; Kingdom of Prussia; Austrian Empire; United Kingdom; Sweden (Spain) Spanish Empire; Kingdom of Portugal; Two Sicilies; Kingdom of Sardinia; Saxony; Bavaria; Württemberg; Baden; United Netherlands	Defeat: Treaty of Fontainebleau; First Treaty of Paris

== Kingdom of Norway (1814–present) ==
Conflict	Combatant 1	Combatant 2	Results	Prime Minister	Casualties
Swedish–Norwegian War (1814)	Norway	Sweden	Defeat (but Swedish acceptance of the Eidsvoll Constitution): Norway entered a personal union with Sweden	Peder Anker	~400 killed
Saint-Barthélemy affair (1821)	Sweden-Norway	Pirates France	Victory	Peder Anker	None
Moroccan expedition (1844)	Sweden-Norway: Norway; Sweden; Denmark Supported by: France; United Kingdom	Morocco: Barbary pirates	Coalition victory: Treaty of Larache	Frederik Due	Unknown
The Thorunn affair (1917)	Norway	Germany	Victory: Norwegian torpedo boats forces the german u-boat to retreat	Gunnar Knudsen	None
World War II (1940–1945)	Soviet Union; United States; British Empire; China; France; Poland; Yugoslavia; Greece; Denmark; Norway; Netherlands; Belgium; Luxembourg; Czechoslovakia (Ethiopian Empire) Ethiopia; Brazil; Mexico; Colombia; Cuba; Philippines; Mongolia	Germany; Japan; Italy; Romania; Hungary; Bulgaria; Slovakia; Croatia	Victory: Collapse of the German Realm; Creation of the United Nations; Emergence of the United States and the Soviet Union as superpowers; Beginning of the Cold War	Johan Nygaardsvold	10,262 killed
Korean War (1950–1953)	South Korea; United States; United Nations	North Korea; China	Ceasefire See: NORMASH	Oscar Torp	None
Congo Crisis (1960–1964)	Congo-Léopoldville (United Nations) ONUC: Ireland; Sweden; Norway; India; Nigeria; Ethiopia	Katanga; South Kasai	Victory: Debellation of Congolese separatist states	Einar Gerhardsen	None
Gulf War (1990–1991)	Australia; Bahrain; Bangladesh; Belgium; Canada; Egypt; France; Italy; Kuwait; Morocco; Netherlands; Denmark; Norway; Oman; Pakistan; Qatar; Saudi Arabia; Senegal; Spain; Sweden; Syria; United Arab Emirates; United Kingdom; United States other allies	Iraq; Republic of Kuwait	Victory	Jan P. Syse / Gro Harlem Brundtland	None
Bosnian War (1992–1995) Selected engagement: Incident at Pristina airport	NATO: Belgium; Canada; Denmark; France; Germany; Italy; Luxembourg; Netherlands; Norway; Portugal; Spain; Turkey; United Kingdom; United States	Republika Srpska	Victory: Dayton Agreement, deployment of NATO-led IFOR	Gro Harlem Brundtland	None
Kosovo War (1998–1999) Selected engagement Operation Allied Force; Operation Joint Guardian	UÇK NATO: Belgium; Canada; Denmark; France; Germany; Italy; Netherlands; Norway; Portugal; Spain; Turkey; United Kingdom; United States	FR Yugoslavia	Victory: Kumanovo Treaty	Kjell Magne Bondevik	None
War in Afghanistan (2001–2021) Some of the Norwegian engagements: Task Force K-Bar; Operation Enduring Freedom; Operation Anaconda; Operation Jacana; Uzbin Valley ambush (after action only); Operation Pickaxe-Handle; Release of hostage Christina Meier; April 2012 Afghanistan attacks Hostage incident at Qargha Reservoir / Lake Qara june 2012; May 2020 Afghanistan attacks Resolute Support Mission; American University of Afghanistan attack Hostage situation at Hetal Hotel, Kabul May 2015; 2018 Inter-Continental Hotel Kabul attack 2015 Park Palace guesthouse attack International Security Assistance Force; Operation Harekate Yolo	Afghanistan ISAF: United States; United Kingdom; Australia; Canada; Germany; France; Italy; Czech Republic; Netherlands; Turkey; Romania; Georgia; South Korea; Poland; Denmark; Sweden; Norway; Finland; Singapore; New Zealand; Mongolia; Bulgaria; Hungary; Belgium; Estonia; Latvia; Lithuania; Portugal; Albania; Slovenia	(Afghanistan) Taliban	Defeat: Fall of the Islamic Emirate of Afghanistan; Taliban retake Kabul	Kjell Magne Bondevik	10 killed
Operation Ocean Shield (2009–2016) Location: Indian Ocean A tall plume of black smoke rises from a destroyed pirate vessel that was struck by USS Farragut in March 2010.	NATO: United States; Belgium; Canada; Denmark; Germany; Greece; Italy; Netherlands; Norway; Portugal; Spain; Turkey; United Kingdom; Australia; China; Colombia; India; Indonesia; Japan; Malaysia; New Zealand; Oman; Pakistan; Russia; Saudi Arabia; Seychelles; Singapore; Somalia; South Korea; Ukraine	Somali pirates	US-allied victory: Number of pirate attacks dramatically decreased; The US Office of Naval Intelligence have officially reported that in 2013, only 9 incidents of piracy were reported and that none of them were successfully hijacked; Piracy drops 90%	Jens Stoltenberg / Erna Solberg	
Libyan Civil War (2011)	(Libya) NTC NATO and allies: France; United Kingdom; United States; Belgium; Canada; Denmark; Netherlands; Norway; Spain; Turkey; Jordan; Sweden; UAE; Qatar	(History of Libya under Muammar Gaddafi) Libya	Victory: The NTC assumed interim control of Libya	Jens Stoltenberg	None
War against the Islamic State (2014–present)	United States; United Kingdom; Iraq (Syria) Syrian Opposition; Australia; Belgium; Canada; Denmark; France; Germany; Italy; Netherlands; New Zealand; Norway; Portugal; Spain; Turkey; Bahrain; Jordan; Morocco; Qatar; Saudi Arabia; United Arab Emirates; Rojava; Egypt; Libya; Nigeria; Cameroon; Chad; Niger; Russia	Islamic State of Iraq and the Levant; Boko Haram al-Nusra Front; Khorasan Ahrar ash-Sham	Ongoing	Erna Solberg / Jonas Gahr Støre	None
Operation Prosperity Guardian (2023–present)	United States; United Kingdom; Canada; France; Greece; Italy; Netherlands; Norway; Spain; Bahrain; Seychelles; Sri Lanka; New Zealand	(Yemen) Supreme Political Council: Houthi movement	Ongoing: US-led multinational coalition formed in December 2023 to respond to attacks on shipping in the Red Sea.	Jonas Gahr Støre	None

== See also ==
- List of wars involving Denmark
- List of wars involving Finland
- List of wars involving Iceland
- List of wars involving Sweden
