= 1342 =

1342 in various calendars
- Gregorian calendar: 1342; MCCCXLII
- Ab urbe condita: 2095
- Armenian calendar: 791; ԹՎ ՉՂԱ
- Assyrian calendar: 6092
- Balinese saka calendar: 1263–1264
- Bengali calendar: 748–749
- Berber calendar: 2292
- English Regnal year: 15 Edw. 3 – 16 Edw. 3
- Buddhist calendar: 1886
- Burmese calendar: 704
- Byzantine calendar: 6850–6851
- Chinese calendar: 辛巳年 (Metal Snake); 4039 or 3832 — to — 壬午年 (Water Horse); 4040 or 3833
- Coptic calendar: 1058–1059
- Discordian calendar: 2508
- Ethiopian calendar: 1334–1335
- Hebrew calendar: 5102–5103
- Hindu calendars
- Vikram Samvat: 1398–1399
- Shaka Samvat: 1263–1264
- Kali Yuga: 4442–4443
- Holocene calendar: 11342
- Igbo calendar: 342–343
- Iranian calendar: 720–721
- Islamic calendar: 742–743
- Japanese calendar: Ryakuō 5 / Kōei 1 (康永元年)
- Javanese calendar: 1254–1255
- Julian calendar: 1342; MCCCXLII
- Korean calendar: 3675
- Minguo calendar: 570 before ROC 民前570年
- Nanakshahi calendar: −126
- Thai solar calendar: 1884–1885
- Tibetan calendar: ལྕགས་མོ་སྦྲུལ་ལོ་ (female Iron-Snake); 1468 or 1087 or 315 — to — ཆུ་ཕོ་རྟ་ལོ་ (male Water-Horse); 1469 or 1088 or 316

Year 1342 (MCCCXLII) was a common year starting on Tuesday and current year of the Julian calendar.

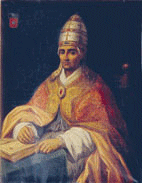
Pope Benedict XII

== Events ==
=== January–December ===
- January 21–June 27 – An-Nasir Ahmad, Sultan of Egypt, rules prior to being deposed by his half-brother As-Salih Ismail.
- May 7 – Pope Clement VI succeeds Pope Benedict XII, as the 198th Pope.
- Late May–late June – War of the Breton Succession: Siege of Hennebont – Forces of Charles, Duke of Brittany, conduct an unsuccessful siege of the fortified port of Hennebont in Brittany, commanded by Joan of Flanders, Countess of Montfort.
- June 26 – Battle of Blidebro: A Danish–German army defeated Swedish–Holsteinian forces near Copenhagen in the Kalundborg War. Some 350 Swedes were killed.
- July 16 – Louis I becomes king of Hungary.
- July 18 – Battle of Zava: Mu'izz al-Din Husayn defeats the Sarbadars.
- July 22 – St. Mary Magdalene's flood is the worst such event on record for central Europe.
- August 15 – Louis "the Child", age 4, succeeds his father, Peter II, as king of Sicily and duke of Athens; he is crowned on September 15 in Palermo Cathedral.
- September 4 – John III of Trebizond (John III Comnenus) becomes emperor of Trebizond.

=== Date unknown ===
- Guy de Lusignan becomes Constantine II, King of Armenia (Gosdantin, Կոստանդին Բ).
- The Greek Orthodox patriarch of Antioch is transferred to Damascus, under Ignatius II.
- Kitzbühel becomes part of Tyrol.
- Byzantine civil war of 1341–1347 – The Zealots seize power in Thessalonica, expelling its aristocrats and declaring themselves in favour of the regency.

== Births ==
- January 17 – Philip II, Duke of Burgundy (d. 1404)
- April 6 – Infanta Maria, Marchioness of Tortosa (d. after 1363)
- November 8 – Julian of Norwich, English mystic (approximate date; d. 1413)
- date unknown
  - Levon V Lusignan of Armenia (d. 1393)
  - Avignon Pope Clement VII (d. 1394)
  - Humphrey de Bohun, 7th Earl of Hereford (d. 1373)
  - John Trevisa, English translator (d. 1402)

== Deaths ==
- March 31 – Dionigi di Borgo San Sepolcro, Italian Augustinian friar
- April 25 – Pope Benedict XII
- July 16 – King Charles I of Hungary
- September 4 – Anna Anachoutlou, Empress of Trebizond
- November 29 – Michael of Cesena, Italian Franciscan leader (b. 1270)
- date unknown
  - Al-Jaldaki, Persian physician and alchemist
  - Peter Paludanus, French bishop and theologian (b. c. 1275)
  - William de Ros, 3rd Baron de Ros
- probable – Marsilius of Padua, Italian scholar (b. 1270)
