= Battle of Ibiza (1109) =

Norway v. pirates, Norwegian victory

- Part of the Norwegian Crusade
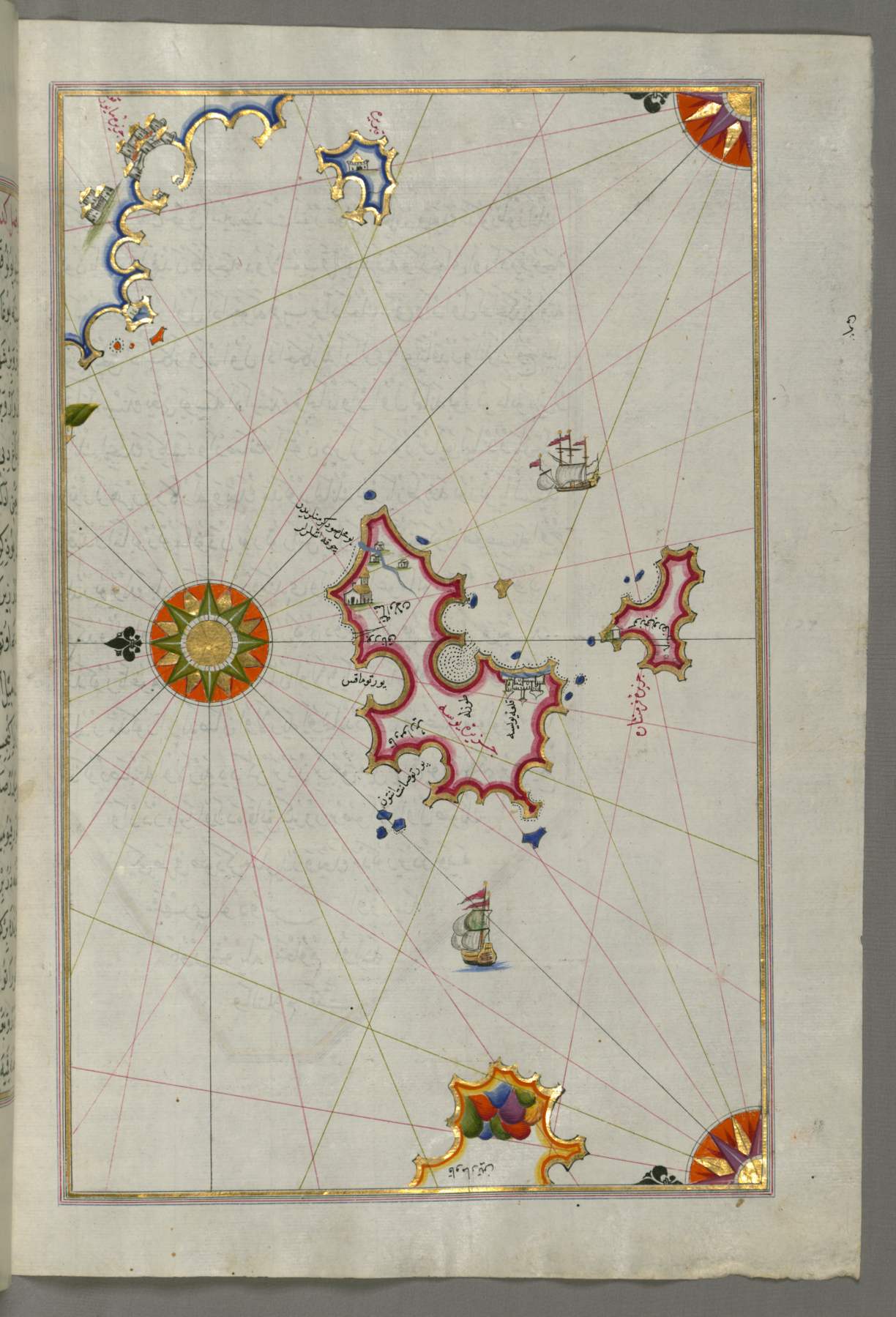
- 11th/12th century map of the islands Ibiza and Formentera
Date	1109
Location	Ibiza
Result	Norwegian victory

Belligerents
Kingdom of Norway	Barbary Pirates of Ibiza

Commanders and leaders
Sigurd I of Norway	

Casualties and losses
Minor	Major

The Battle of Ibiza (Norwegian: Slaget ved Ibiza), also known as the Raid on Ibiza, was a part of a military campaign against the Muslims of the Balearic Islands. Islamic scholars have referred to the Norwegian raids in the region as part of a larger history of Islamic Spain. After winning a battle at the island of Formentera, Sigurd would go on to attack the islands of Ibiza, which is only separated from Formentera by a narrow channel.

== Battle ==
The battle was a raid by the Crusader army from Norway against the pirates of Ibiza. The battle is described in the sagas as Sigurd the Crusader's seventh victory against the "heathens" (Muslims). A description of the battle was given by the skald Halldorr Skvaldri.

Much adored came a distinguished one

Of a murder-wheel, steering a ship

Eager was the waker of fame

To end peace, to Ibiza.

— Halldorr Skvaldri

== Aftermath ==
After this, the Norwegian fleet continued their journey to the Holy Land via Menorca and Sicily before eventually reaching the Kingdom of Jerusalem, where they accompanied Baldwin I in the Siege of Sidon. These battles on the Balearic Islands influenced the 1113–1115 Balearic Islands expedition, which saw Crusaders dismantle Ibiza's defences and occupy the island for a short while before leaving the island that would be later reconquered by the Almoravid dynasty.
