= Kongesangen =

Royal anthem of Norway

English: King's Song
- Royal anthem of Norway
- Lyrics: N. Vogtmann and Gustav Jensen
- Music: Unknown, based on "God Save the King"
- Adopted: 1906

Audio sample
- Instrumental version: file; help

"Kongesangen" ([ˈkɔ̂ŋːəˌsɑŋn̩]; "King's Song") is Norway's royal anthem. The lyrics come in several versions. The first version ("Gud sign vår Konge god, gi ham i farer mod") was written by N. Vogtmann around 1800, but the version used today and quoted below was written by Gustav Jensen for the coronation of King Haakon VII and Queen Maud in 1906 and later used in the Church of Norway hymnal Landstads reviderte salmebok. It was inspired by the British royal and national anthem and set to the tune of "God Save the King"; Henrik Wergeland wrote a translation of "God Save the King" in 1841, dedicated to King Carl Johan of Norway and Sweden.

== Lyrics ==
Norwegian original

I
Gud sign vår konge god!
Sign ham med kraft og mot,
sign hjem og slott!
(𝄆) Lys for ham ved din Ånd,
knytt med din sterke hånd
hellige troskapsbånd
om folk og drott! (𝄇)

II
Høyt sverger Norges mann
hver i sitt kall, sin stand,
troskap sin drott.
(𝄆) Trofast i liv og død,
tapper i krig og nød,
alltid vårt Norge lød
Gud og sin drott. (𝄇)

IPA transcription (Note: See Help:IPA/Norwegian and Norwegian phonology. The transcription is based on Urban East Norwegian; /r/'s are guttural in more western dialects, among other differences.)

1
[ɡʉːd sɪŋn ʋoːr ˈkɔ̂ŋ.ŋɛ̠ ɡuː]
[sɪŋn hɑm meː krɑft ɔ muːt]
[sɪŋn jɛm ɔ ʂlɔtː]
(𝄆) [lyːs fɔrː hɑm ʋeː dɪn ɔn]
[knytː meː dɪn ˈstær.kə hɔn]
[ˈhɛ.lɪ.ə ˈtruː.skɑːps.bɔn]
[ɔm fɔlk ɔ drɔtː] (𝄇)

2
[hœʏ̯t ˈsʋær.ɡɛ̠r ˈnɔr.ɡəs mɑnː]
[ʋær iː sɪtː kɑl sɪn stɑnː]
[ˈtruː.skɑːp sɪn drɔtː]
(𝄆) [ˈtruː.fɑst iː liːʋ ɔ dœːd]
[ˈtɑp.pɛ̠r iː kriːɡ ɔ nœːd]
[ˈɑl.tiː ʋɔrt ˈnɔr.ɡə lœːd]
[ɡʉːd ɔ sɪn drɔtː] (𝄇)

English translation

I
God bless our good king!
Bless him with strength and courage,
bless home and castle!
(𝄆) Guide him with your Spirit,
forge with your strong Hand
holy bonds of allegiance
around people and king! (𝄇)

II
Loudly pledge men of Norway
each in his calling, his station,
loyalty to his king.
(𝄆) Loyal in life and death,
courageous in war and distress,
always our Norway obeyed
God and its king. (𝄇)
