= Taifa of Majorca =

Islamic taifa state in the Mediterranean Sea

Coordinates: 39.6331°N 2.7467°E

- 1018–1203
- Capital: Palma
- Common languages: Arabic; Mozarabic; Hebrew
- Religion: Islam; Roman Catholicism; Judaism
- Government: Monarchy
- Historical era: Middle Ages
  - Established: 1018
  - Conquered by the Almohads: 1203
- Currency: Dirham and Dinar
Preceded by	Succeeded by
Taifa of Dénia	Almoravid dynasty; Almohad Caliphate
- Today part of: Spain

The Taifa of Majorca was a medieval Islamic taifa kingdom which existed from 1018 to 1203 in Majorca. It was founded by the Slavic warlord Mujāhid al-ʿĀmirī.

The first taifa lasted for about 50 years (1076-1116), first succumbing to a Christian crusade and later being occupied by the Almoravids. After a period in which the Balearic Islands were integrated into the Almoravid Empire, it ended up disintegrating, suffering the same fate as the Caliphate of Córdoba. It was ruled by the Aglabid dynasty, an Arab Najdi dynasty of the Banu Tamim tribe.

A new, independent kingdom arose, the second taifa (1147-1203), under the Banu Ghaniya dynasty, which would become the last Almoravid stronghold in Al-Andalus against the Almohads' advance.

== List of Emirs ==
=== Mujahid dynasty ===
- Mujāhid al-ʿĀmirī: 1018–1041
- 'Ali Iqbal ud-Dawlah: 1041–1075

=== Aglabid dynasty ===
- Ibn Aglab al-Murtada: 1076–1093
- Mubassir: 1093–1114
- Abu-l-Rabi Sulayman "El Burabe": 1114–1126

=== Ghaniyid dynasty ===
- Muhammad I: 1126–1155
- Ishaq: c. 1155–1184
- Muhammad II (deposed in a coup): 1184 d. 1187
- Ali (left to conquer the Maghreb): 1184
- Abu al-Zubayr or Talha: November 1184–1185
- Muhammad II (restored): 1185–1185
- Tashfin: 1185–1187
- 'Abdallah: 1187–1203
  - To Almohads: 1203–1229

== See also ==
- List of Sunni Muslim dynasties
