= Liber maiolichinus de gestis Pisanorum illustribus =

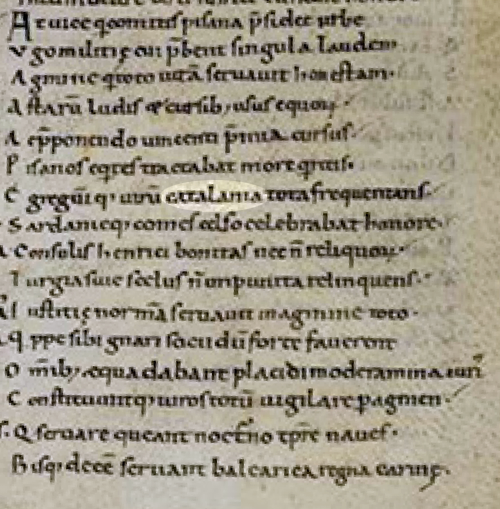
Part of the Liber with the word Catalania highlighted

The Liber maiolichinus (Note: The spelling Maiorichinus is sometimes encountered.) de gestis pisanorum illustribus (transl. Mallorcan Book of the Deeds of the Illustrious Pisans) is a Medieval Latin epic chronicle in 3,500 hexameters, written between 1117 and 1125, detailing the Pisan-led joint military expedition of Italians, Catalans, and Occitans against the taifa of the Balearic Islands, in particular Mallorca and Ibiza, in 1113–1115. The commune of Pisa commissioned it, and its anonymous author was probably a cleric. (Note: Though Lawrence of Verona (Lorenzo Vernes, Laurentius Veronensis) and Henry of Pisa have been suggested as potential authors.) It survives in three manuscripts. The Liber is notable for containing the earliest known reference to "Catalans" (Catalanenses), treated as an ethnicity, and to "Catalonia" (Catalania), as their homeland. (Note: The Liber refers to Raymond Berengar III, the Count of Barcelona, as dux Catalanensis (Catalan duke) and rector Catalanicus hostes (leader of the Catalan armies). Both Raymond and the comes Ampurie, Hug II of Empúries, are each referred to as Catalanicus heros (Catalan hero). The Catalans in general are referred to as Christicolas Catalanensesque (Christians and Catalans).)

The Liber, which is the most important primary source for the brief conquest of the Balearics, portrays the expedition as motivated by a desire to free Christian captives held as slaves by the Muslims and to curtail Muslim piracy "from Spain to Greece." Christian zeal is stressed no less than civic pride, and the account of the 1113 expedition is prefaced by a history of Pisan–Muslim conflicts in the eleventh century. The Liber is also the earliest source for the raid of the Norwegian king Sigurd Jorsalfar on Formentera, one of the Balearic islands and a hotbed of piracy.
