= Moriconi =

Moriconi is a surname. Notable people with the surname include:

- Massimo Moriconi (musician) (born 1955), Italian bassist
- Massimo Moriconi (canoeist) (born 1956), Italian sprint canoer
- Niccolò Moriconi (born 1996), stage name Ultimo, Italian pop singer-songwriter
- Pietro Moriconi (died 1119), Archbishop of Pisa
- Sylvia Moriconi (fl. 1996–1999), member of the Italy women's national water polo team in the 1990s
- Valeria Moriconi (1931–2005), Italian actress
