= Stødle Church =

Church in Vestland, Norway

- Stødle kyrkje
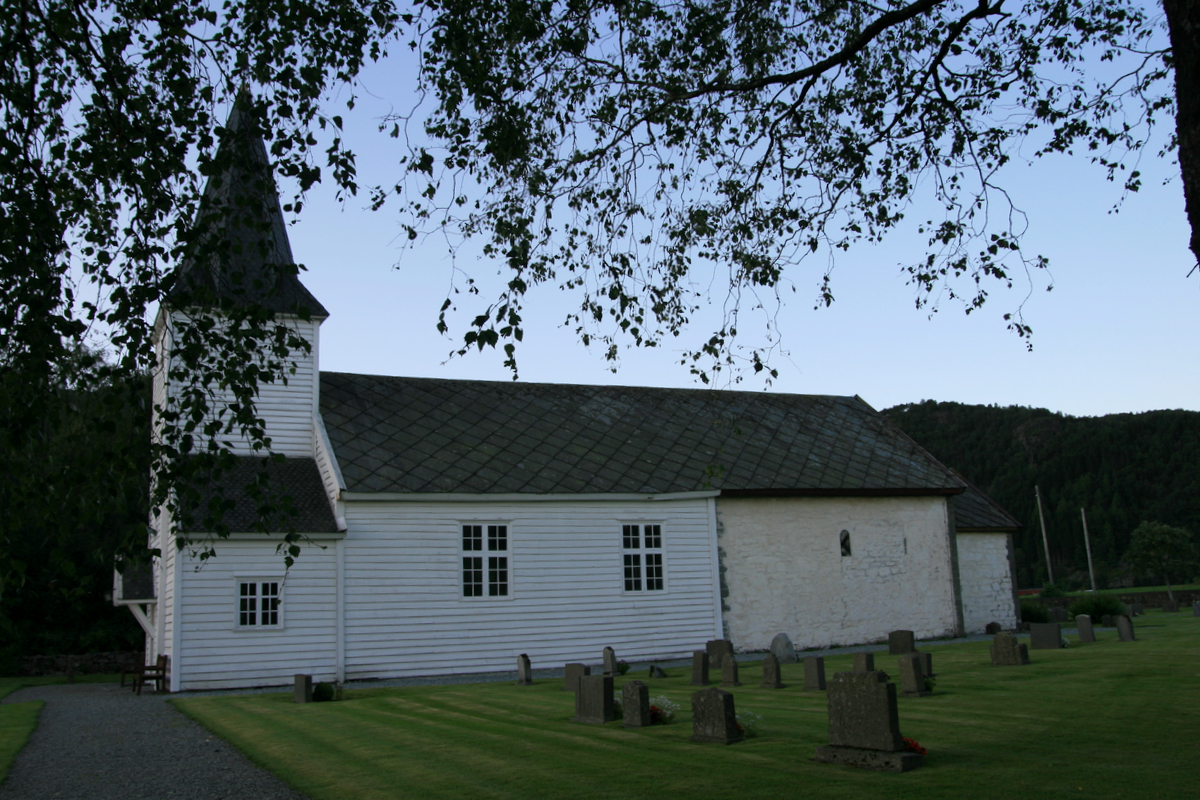
- View of the church
- Stødle Church
- 59°40′23″N 5°57′57″E
- Location: Etne Municipality, Vestland
- Country: Norway
- Denomination: Church of Norway
- Previous denomination: Catholic Church
- Churchmanship: Evangelical Lutheran

History
- Status: Parish church
- Founded: c. 1160
- Consecrated: c. 1160

Architecture
- Functional status: Active
- Architectural type: Long church
- Completed: c. 1160 (866 years ago)

Specifications
- Capacity: 245
- Materials: Stone and wood

Administration
- Diocese: Bjørgvin bispedømme
- Deanery: Sunnhordland prosti
- Parish: Etne
- Norwegian Cultural Heritage Site
- Type: Church
- Status: Automatically protected
- ID: 84992

Stødle Church (Norwegian: Stødle kyrkje) is a parish church of the Church of Norway in Etne Municipality in Vestland county, Norway. It is located in the village of Etnesjøen. It is one of the churches for the Etne parish which is part of the Sunnhordland prosti (deanery) in the Diocese of Bjørgvin. The white, stone and wood church was built in a long church design in 1160 using plans drawn up by an unknown architect. The church has been renovated and expanded several times over the centuries, and it currently seats about 245 people.

== History ==
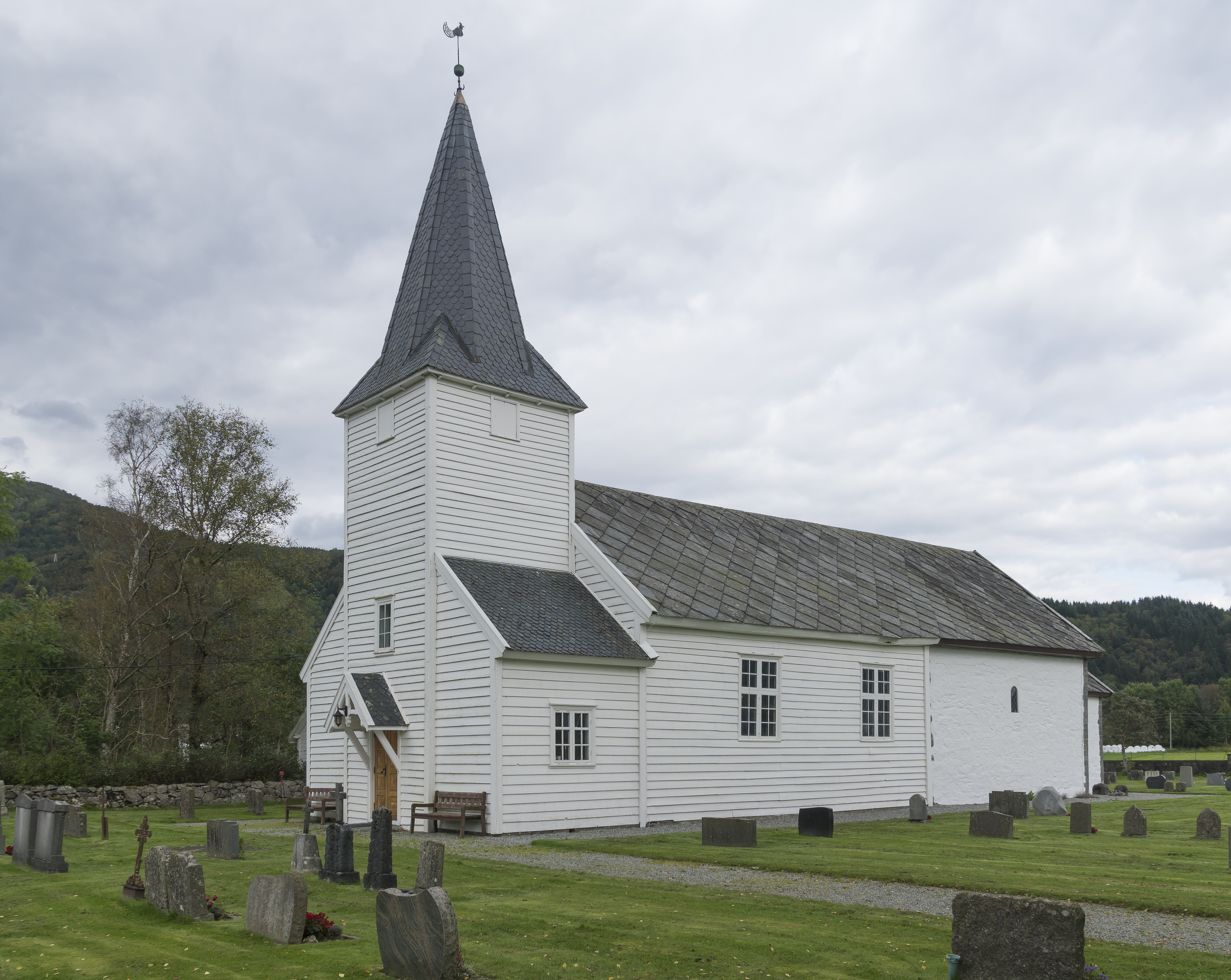
View of the church

The earliest existing historical records of the church date back to the year 1329, but the church was not new that year. The original stone church had a rectangular nave and a narrower, rectangular chancel. This building was likely built around the year 1160. It is believed that the church may have originally been a private church for the family of Erling Skakke, a Norwegian Jarl, who lived in Stødle during the 12th century.

In the early 1600s (possibly in 1615), the old stone church was enlarged by adding a new stave church wooden addition to the west end of the building. The new addition became the new nave. The old nave was then redesigned as a choir and the old choir became a sacristy. In 1690, the old wooden nave was torn down and a new, larger timber-framed nave was built on the same site. This construction project was built by Askild Tepstad and Erik Eide.

The church was purchased by J.F. Tuchsen during the Norwegian church sale in 1723, when the King sold many churches to pay for the expenses from the Great Northern War. After several different private owners, the church was purchased by the parish in 1860 and was no longer privately owned. In 1879, a new church porch with a tower above it was built on the west end of the building. In 1957–1958, the church underwent a major renovation, which included widening the church porch located under the tower to add a sacristy and a bathroom.

== See also ==
- List of churches in Bjørgvin
