= Ladejarl-Fairhair succession wars =

Conflicts between the Fairhair Dynasty and Earls of Lede

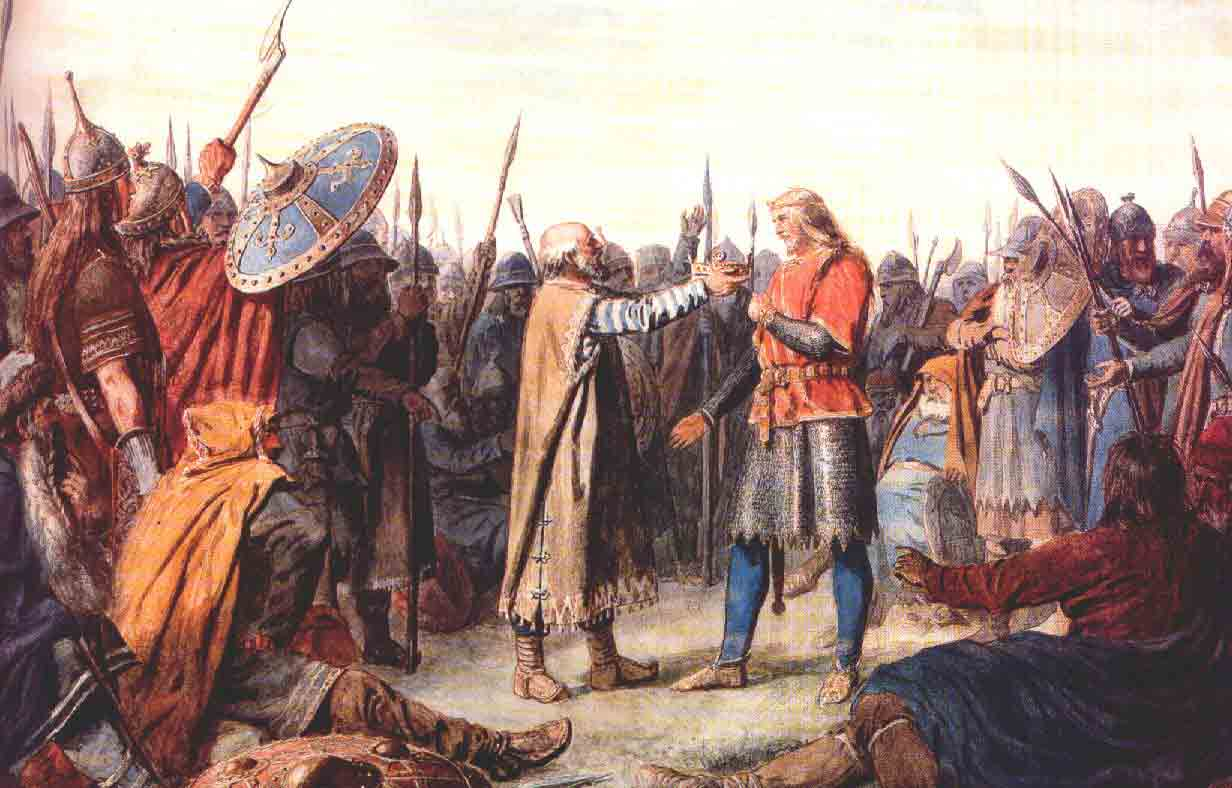
- The crowning of Olav I of Norway.
Date	970–1030
Location	Norway
Result	Fairhair dynasty victory
Territorial changes	Magnus the Good takes back the Norwegian throne in 1035

Belligerents
Fairhair dynasty	Ladejarls
	Denmark

Units involved
Unknown	Unknown

Casualties and losses
Unknown	Unknown

The Ladejarl-Fairhair succession wars was a long series of battles between the Fairhair dynasty and the Earls of Lade. The conflict started when Harald Greycloak was lured into Denmark by Haakon Sigurdsson, where he was killed in battle at Limfjord in Denmark ca. 970. The conflict would come to an end because of Haakon Ericsson's Death at sea around Pentland Firth in 1029-1030, because of King Cnut who called Haakon back to Norway because of Olav Haraldssons attempt to regain the Norwegian throne back from Cnut.

== Background ==
After Harald Greycloak ascended the throne with his brothers ca. 960-961 after the Battle of Fitjar where Haakon the Good would die from his wounds after the battle. Harald would rule harshly in the kingdom, and he would go on and set a house on fire that had Sigurd Haakonson a Earl of Lade and an advisor to the earlier king Haakon, and with his warriors, they would be burned to death at Aglo, modern-day Skatval.

In 970 he was killed by Haakon Sigurdsson, the son of Sigurd Haakonson who would avenge his father's death with the help of his ally Harold Bluetooth King of Denmark. This would result in Harold Bluetooth gaining the Kingdom of Norway, but Haakon would be an independent de facto ruler of Trønderlag and Western Norway.

== Rebellion against Haakon Sigurdsson ==
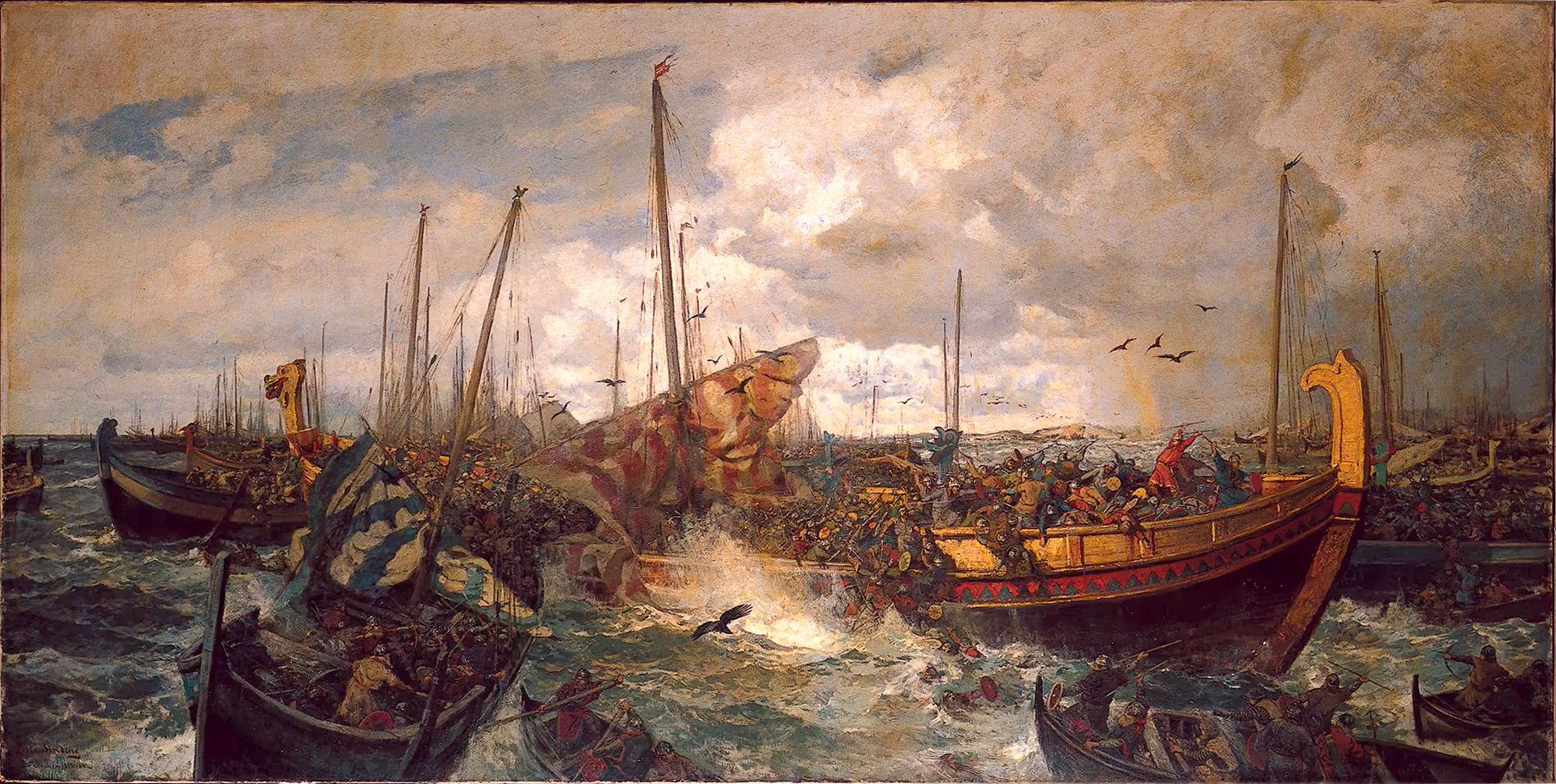
The Battle of Svolder, by Otto Sinding

In 995 there were rumors that began about a descendant of the first king of Norway Harald Fairhair, Olaf Tryggvason. Earl Haakon Sigurdsson had been the ruler in Western Norway, in Trøndelag and in Northern Norway for the last seven years after Harald Greycloak's death. The sagas says that Trønder noblemen started a rebellion against Earl Haakon, where he would be killed by his slave named Tormod Kark. This would help Olaf Tryggvason ascension to the Norwegian throne.

== Battle of Svolder ==
The Battle of Svolder ca. 1000 would be a major battle in the Ladejarl-Fairhair succession wars, the battle would end in a major defeat for the Fairhair dynasty and Olaf Tryggvason would die in this battle. Norway would be divided by Denmark, Sweden, and Earls of Lade, Sweyn Forkbeard of Danmark would be crowned as king of Norway. Erik Hakonsson and his brother Sweyn Haakonsson would take control over Trønderlag and Western Norway, Sweden would have some taxed areas along the Norwegian border.

== Olav II's conquest of Norway ==
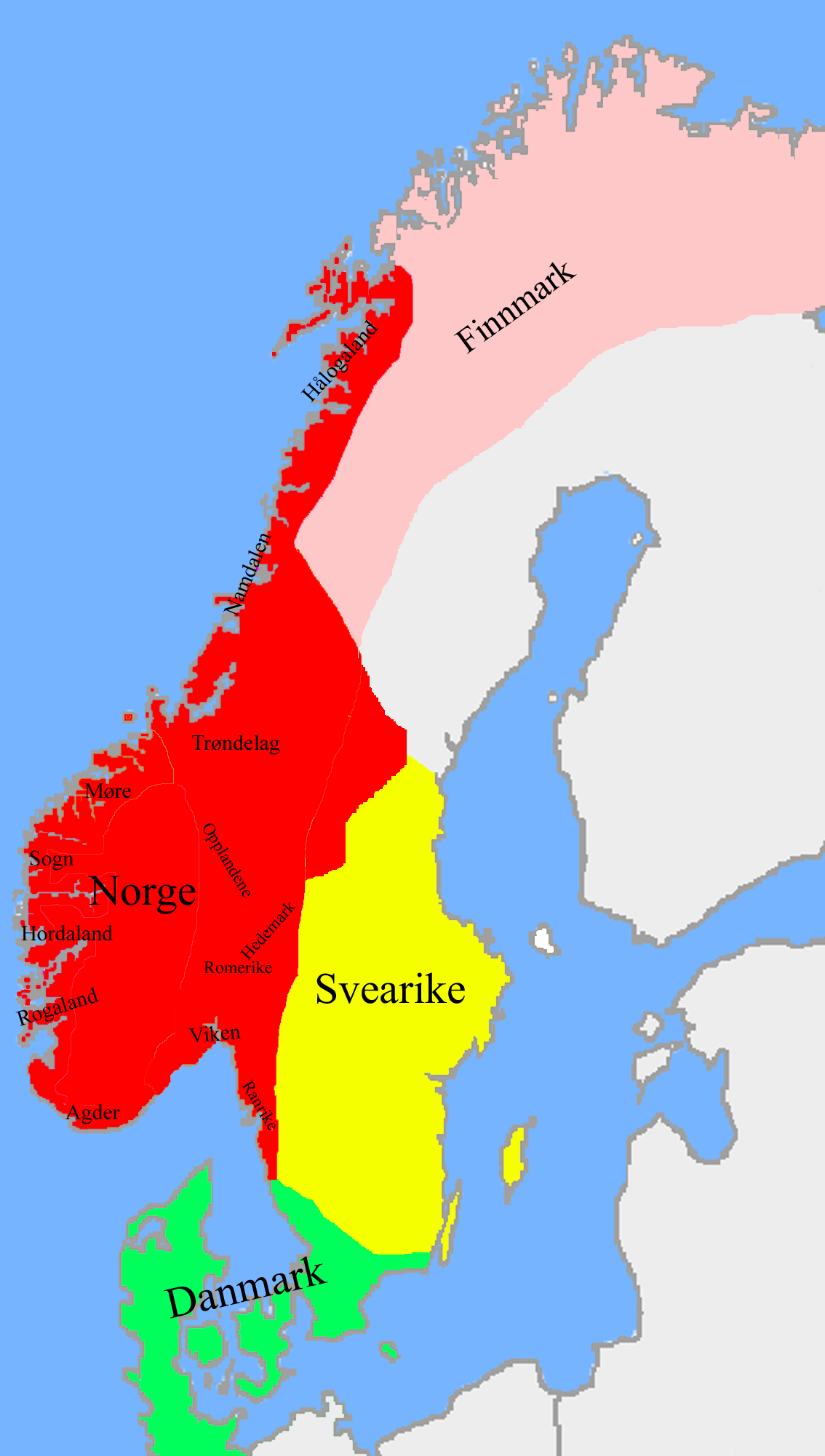
Norway in 1020

After the Battle of Svolder Olaf II Haraldsson would return to Norway in around 1015 and try to claim the throne back from Denmark and the Earls of Lade. It would be the perfect opportunity to strike and take back the throne because of Cnut who had moved his army to England to aid in his conquest. Olaf II Haraldsson would quickly move into Norway and try to get support from the Norwegian Chieftains, he would gain support from his kin in Ringerike, and support in Opplandene, with the support of his allies Olaf II Haraldsson would win at the Battle of Nesjar. Sweyn Haakonsson would flee to Sweden after the battle where he would try to muster a force to retake Norway, but he would die from illness before even attempting his plan.

== Aftermath ==
The Ladejarl-Fairhair succession wars would end in victory for the Fairhair dynasty, but the throne would not be taken by Fairhair dynasty after the Earls of Lade were dead, but after the death of Cnut in 1035. Magnus the Good would become the ruler of Norway and later also the king of Denmark. The Earls of Lade would become extinct in 1029-1030 after Haakon Ericsson death at sea around Orkney. the Fairhair dynasty would be on the throne for the next 95 years in Norway until the Norwegian civil war in 1130 where another house would claim the throne for Norway.
