= Swedish–Norwegian War (1063) =

Date	1063 or 1064
Location	Vänern
Result	Norwegian Victory
Territorial changes	Harald Hardrada strengthens his authority in Opplandene

Belligerents
(Kingdom of Norway (872–1397)) Kingdom of Norway	(History of Sweden (800–1521)) Kingdom of Sweden

Commanders and leaders
(Kingdom of Norway (872–1397)) Harald Hardrada	(History of Sweden (800–1521)) Jarl Håkon Ivarsson

Units involved
Unknown	Unknown

Casualties and losses
Unknown	Heavy

The Swedish–Norwegian War (1063) (Första norgekriget) (Første norsk-svenske krig) took place in 1063 or 1064. It was fought between the Norwegian king Harald Hardrada and the Swedes who supported Håkon Ivarsson, the jarl of Opplandene.

== History ==
In 1062, the king and the earl were openly hostile with each other over a disagreement about the flight of the Danish king Svein Estridson during the Battle of Niså. The king accused the earl of treason after learning that the Danish king had been taken to the countryside by Håkon Ivarsson's men.

Earl Håkon Ivarsson had to escape from Oslo to the Swedish king Stenkil, who gave him control of the Värmland region. With that, a Norwegian-Swedish conflict was inevitable, because Ivarsson started an uprising in 1062 to 1063 during his early earldom.

In the spring of 1064, the war against Denmark was put on hold after the negotiations between the Norwegians and the Danes at Elven, which ended with a settlement between the two kings who each had their own internal problems. Immediately after this, King Harald turned against the uplanders; they said that they would not pay taxes since they had already paid to the earl, who had a large army in Götaland. To force the payment of taxes, the king first had to defeat the earl.

In the early autumn of 1063 or 1064, the king went south to Künghalla with the army. They gathered up light ships, and sailed up the Gøtaelven and to the waterfalls. The light ships were dragged overland by the waterfalls and up to Lake Vänern. Then the Norwegian fleet rowed across the lake to the east, where Håkon Ivarsson lived. Earl Håkon came down from the country with the Swedish army to meet the Norwegians.

== Harald Hardrada's victory ==
Harald Hardrada and his army went ashore from a river on the east side of Vänern and up into the country, where they found the Swedish army lined up on the other side of a marsh. The Battle of Vänern ended in victory for the Norwegians, who won under the leadership of the more experienced king, the earl having been driven out without his mark.

With the victory, the earl's influence in the Uplands was destroyed, and with partly brutal methods the last remnants of resistance to the king's rule were suppressed, in the winter of 1064 to 1065. During the winter, Romerike, Hedmark, Hadeland and Ringerike were ravaged with fire and killings by the royal forces. With terror tactics, the Uplanders were subject to the king's control once again. In Sweden, Håkon Ivarsson's defeat was a severe blow to the Swedish king.
