= Abu al-Mundhir =

Abu al-Mundhir (Arabic: أبو المنذر; ? – 1114 in Yabisa, Eastern Isles of Al-Andalus) was an Andalusi Muslim military commander, originally a Catalan renegade from Girona. By the time of the Catalan-Pisan expedition against Mayurqa, he was designated directly by the wali of Mayurqa as the commander of the Muslim forces that defended Yabisa from the Pisan invaders. He is reported to have disappeared during the catastrophe that followed the fall of madinat Yabisa to the Pisan besieging army.
