= Henry of Pisa =

12th-century cardinal

Henry of Pisa is a cardinal from the 12th century. He urged Thomas Becket to accept the role of archbishop after Archbishop Theobald of Bec died. He was the pope’s legate.
