= Abdallah ibn Ghaniya =

Abdallah ibn Ishaq ibn Muhammad ibn Ghaniya, known as Abdallah ibn Ghaniya (Arabic: عبد الله بن غانية) (died 1203) was a member of the Banu Ghaniya dynasty who fought against the Almohad Caliphate in the late twelfth and early thirteenth centuries. In c. 1187 he captured the former Bani Ghaniya stronghold of Majorca in the Balearic Islands, and ruled over it until his defeat and death at the hands of the Almohads in 1203.

== Career ==
Abdallah was a son of Ishaq ibn Muhammad, the ruler of the Balearic Islands from c. 1156 to 1183, and the brother of 'Ali ibn Ghaniya and Yahya ibn Ghaniya, who led a fifty-year long insurgency against the Almohads in the Maghreb. He accompanied his brother 'Ali when the latter set out from the Balearics and invaded North Africa in 1184, and upon the capture of Bajjaya (Bougie) that year he and Yahya were stationed in the town, remaining there until an Almohad counteroffensive forced them to flee approximately seven months later.

=== Balearics ===
Following a pro-Almohad coup in the Balearics in c. 1185, in which the Almohad commander 'Ali ibn al-Reberter reinstalled Muhammad ibn Ishaq as amir, 'Abdallah was dispatched by his brother 'Ali to retake the islands and set out with a fleet from Tripoli. After stopping in Sicily, where he received reinforcements from the Norman king William II, he made his way to Majorca and linked up with loyalist forces headed by Najah, who had maintained a resistance against Ibn al-Reberter and Muhammad. The majority of the peasantry also rallied to Abdallah's side, and he was quickly able to secure control of Majorca and the surrounding islands.

=== Majorca ===
Upon completing his conquest of Majorca, Abdallah remained in charge of the island, serving there as amir on behalf of his brother 'Ali. During his rule he maintained friendly relations with Peter II of Aragon and secured a peace and commercial treaty with the Republic of Genoa in 1188, allowing the latter to establish a church and hostel for foreign merchants on Majorca. He also resumed raiding activities, particularly against Provence and Almohad possessions in eastern al-Andalus, and continued assisting his brothers in the Maghreb, sending two ships to assist Yahya ibn Ghaniya when the latter besieged Tripoli in the 1190s.

Throughout his reign in Majorca, Abdallah was forced to contend with the Almohads, who made repeated attempts to take the Balearic Islands. Ibiza was captured by an Almohad fleet in 1187, and Menorca also fell at an unspecified date. In the winter of 1200, Abdallah undertook an attempt to regain Ibiza, but was compelled to retreat in failure; in the following year he had more success against Menorca, taking it after a prolonged siege which saw the inhabitants resort to acts of cannibalism.

=== 1203 ===
Abdallah's amirate came to an end in 1203, when the Almohads launched a major expedition to the Balearics against him. The Almohad forces, commanded by Abu al-'Ula and Abu Sa'id 'Uthman ibn Abi Hafs and consisting of 15,000 infantry, 700 archers, 1,200 cavalry, and several siege engines, encountered Abdallah's fleet at Menorca and destroyed it, after which they seized control of Menorca and proceeded to blockade Majorca. Although the capital was able to hold out for over two months, the defenders were eventually defeated and Abdallah himself was killed. The Balearic Islands were then turned into an Almohad possession, remaining in their hands until they were conquered by James I of Aragon in 1229.

== Notes ==
Preceded by Tashfin ibn Ishaq	Amir of Majorca c. 1187–1203	Succeeded by Almohad rule
