= 1113–1115 Balearic Islands expedition =

Crusade against a Muslim kingdom

- Part of the Crusades
- The taifa of the Balearics (green), with its capital (Mallorca), the Crusaders' chief target, indicated.
Date	1113–1115
Location	Balearic Islands
Result	Christian victory

Belligerents
Republic of Pisa; Catalan counties County of Provence; Giudicato of Torres; Papal States	Taifa of Majorca; Almoravids

Commanders and leaders
Pietro Moriconi; Ramon Berenguer III of Barcelona; Hug II of Empúries; Saltaro of Torres	Abu-l-Rabi Sulayman (POW); Abu al-Mundhir †

Strength
300 Pisan ships 150 Catalan and Provençal ships	Unknown

Casualties and losses
Unknown	High

In 1114, an expedition to the Balearic Islands, then a Muslim taifa, was launched in the form of a Crusade. Founded on a treaty of 1113 between the Republic of Pisa and Ramon Berenguer III, Count of Barcelona, the expedition had the support of Pope Paschal II and the participation of many lords of Catalonia and Occitania, as well as contingents from northern and central Italy, Sardinia, and Corsica. The Crusaders were perhaps inspired by the Norwegian king Sigurd I's attack on Formentera in 1108 or 1109 during the Norwegian Crusade. The expedition ended in 1115 in the conquest of the Balearics, but only until the next year. The main source for the event is the Pisan Liber maiolichinus, completed by 1125.

== Treaty and preparations ==
In 1085 Pope Gregory VII had granted suzerainty over the Balearics to Pisa. In September 1113 a Pisan fleet making an expedition to Mallorca was put off course by a storm and ended up near Blanes on the coast of Catalonia, which they initially mistook for the Balearics. The Pisans met with the Count of Barcelona in the port of Sant Feliu de Guíxols, where on 7 September they signed a treaty causa corroborandae societatis et amicitiae ('for strengthening [their] alliance and friendship'). Specifically the Pisans were exempted from the usagium and the jus naufragii in all the territories, present and future, of the Count of Barcelona, though Arles and Saint-Gilles, in the recently acquired March of Provence, were singled out for special mention (three times).

The only surviving copy of the treaty between Pisa and Barcelona is found interpolated in a charter of James I granted to Pisa in 1233. It affirms that the meeting was unplanned and apparently arranged by God. Some scholars have expressed doubt about the lack of preparation, citing the Catalans' rapid response to the presence of the Pisans as evidence of some previous contact. The attribution of the meeting to Providence alone may have been concocted to add an "aura of sacredness" to the alliance and the crusade.

The treaty, or what survives of it, does not refer to military cooperation or a venture against Mallorca; perhaps that agreement was oral, or perhaps its record has been lost, but a Crusade was planned for 1114. The chief goal was the freeing of Christian captives and the suppression of Muslim piracy. Most of the Pisan fleet returned to Pisa, but some ships damaged by the storm remained to be repaired and some men remained behind to construct siege engines. In the spring of 1114 a new fleet of eighty ships arrived from Pisa, following the French coast, briefly staying at Marseille.

The fleet brought with it Cardinal Bosone, an envoy from Paschal II, who vigorously supported the expedition, authorising it in a bull as early as 1113. Paschal had also granted the Pisans the Romana signa, sedis apostolicae vexillum ("Roman standard, the flag of the apostolic see"), and his appeals for the expedition had borne fruit. Besides the 300 ships of the Pisan contingent, there were 120 Catalan and Occitan vessels (plus a large army), contingents from the Italian cities of Florence, Lucca, Pistoia, Rome, Siena, and Volterra, and from Sardinia and Corsica under Saltaro, the son of Constantine I of Logudoro. Among the Catalan princes there were Ramon Berenguer, Hug II of Empúries, and Ramon Folc II of Cardona. The most important lords of Occitania participated, with the exception of the Count of Toulouse, Alfonso Jordan: William V of Montpellier, with twenty ships; Aimeric II of Narbonne, with twenty ships; and Raymond I of Baux, with seven ships. Bernard Ato IV, the chief of the Trencavel family, also participated. Ramon Berenguer and his wife, Douce, borrowed 100 morabatins from the Ramon Guillem, the Bishop of Barcelona, to finance the expedition.

== Conquest and loss ==
The combined Crusader fleet raided Ibiza in June, and destroyed its defences, since Ibiza lay between Mallorca and the mainland and would have posed a continued threat during a siege. The Liber maiolichinus also records the taking of captives, who were trying to hide in careae (probably caves), on Formentera. Ibiza was under Crusader control by August. The Crusaders invested Palma de Mallorca in August 1114. As the siege dragged on the counts of Barcelona and Empúries entered into peace negotiations with the Muslim ruler of Mallorca, but the cardinal and Pietro Moriconi, the Archbishop of Pisa, interfered to put an end to the discussions. Probably the Catalan rulers, whose lands lay nearest the Balearics, expected an annual payment of parias (tribute) from the Muslims and the cessation of pirate raids in return for lifting the siege.

Muslim reinforcements, Almoravids from the Iberian port of Denia, surprised a Pisan flotilla of six in the waters off Ibiza, with only two of the Pisan vessels making it to safety, which consisted of the remains of a fortress burned by the king of Norway a decade earlier. In April 1115 the city capitulated and its entire population was enslaved. This victory was followed by the capture of most of the Balearics' major settlements and the freeing of most captive Christians on the islands. The independent Muslim taifa ruler was taken back to Pisa a captive. The greatest victory, however, was the annihilation of Mallorcan piracy.

The conquest of the Balearics lasted no more than a few months. In 1115 they were reconquered by the Almoravids of peninsular Iberia.
