= Battle of Formentera (1109) =

Norwegian raid against a Balearic island

- Part of the Norwegian Crusade
Date	1109
Location	Formentera
Result	Norwegian victory

Belligerents
(Kingdom of Norway (872–1397)) Kingdom of Norway	Saracen Pirates

Commanders and leaders
(Kingdom of Norway (872–1397)) Sigurd I of Norway	Unknown

Casualties and losses
Unknown, low	Reportedly all were killed

The Battle of Formentera (1109) (Norwegian: Slaget ved Formentera) was a part of a military campaign against the Muslims of the Balearic Islands. The raid was a huge success for the Norwegian Crusaders, facing low casualties. Islamic scholars have referred to the Norwegian raids in the region as part of a larger history of Islamic Spain.

== Background ==
The raid occurred on the Crusaders' journey to the Holy Land in the Levant. There had been multiple military successes before this such as the Siege of Lisbon and the Raid on Santiago de Compostela. The islands were often perceived as a pirate haven and slaving centre by Christians.

== Battle ==
The Crusaders arrived at the small island of Formentera. The island settlement is described as precarious and inhabited by Saracens. The settlement was established in a cave in a cliff where they kept considerable plunder they had gained from raiding.

According to the Heimskringla, King Sigurd lowered several ships with four men in front of an inaccessible rock slab on Formentera to drive out a group of so-called "heathen bluemen" (North African Muslims) who had entrenched themselves there. By attaching ropes to the front and back of the boats and securing them under the ribs, they lowered the boats down the side of the cliff. The Norwegian archers and stone throwers, who were protected inside these boats, successfully forced the Saracens to retreat from the defensive wall and into the cave. As a result, Sigurd and his troops were able to climb up the cliff and reach the wall.

Once they breached the wall, the Norwegians gathered large pieces of wood near the entrance of the cave, set them on fire, and suffocated or burned the people inside. They also killed anyone who tried to escape. The loot recovered from the cave was said to be the most valuable of the entire expedition. (Note: Gary Doxey adds the comment that this event probably qualifies for the most notable one in the small island's history. (p.146))

== Bibliography ==
- Sturluson, Snorri (2015). Heimskringla Volume III. University College London. ISBN 978-0-903521-93-2.
- Morten, Øystein (2022). Jakten på Sigurd Jorsalfare. Spartacus. ISBN 9788243014787.
