= Tashfin ibn Ishaq ibn Muhammad ibn Ghaniya =

Tashfin ibn Ishaq ibn Muhammad ibn Ghaniya (Arabic: تاشفين بن إسحاق بن محمد بن غانية) was a ruler of the Balearic Islands, from c. 1185 to c. 1187.

A member of the Banu Ghaniya dynasty, Tashfin came to power in Majorca as a replacement for his brother Muhammad ibn Ishaq, who had been overthrown by his Muslim subjects after he attempted to seek support from Barcelona against the Almohad Caliphate. He remained in command of the Balearic Islands until 'Ali ibn Ghaniya sent a fleet under the command of 'Abdallah ibn Ghaniya to Majorca, whereupon he was deposed and replaced by 'Abdallah as amir.

== Notes ==
Preceded by Muhammad ibn Ishaq	Amir of Majorca c. 1185–c. 1187	Succeeded by 'Abdallah ibn Ghaniya
