= Rögnvald Kali's Crusade =

1152–1155 religious war

Date	1152–1155
Location	The Levant and the Mediterranean
Result	Crusader victory

Belligerents
(Kingdom of Norway (872–1397)) Kingdom of Norway: Earldom of Orkney	Unknown Muslims

Commanders and leaders
(Kingdom of Norway (872–1397)) Rögnvald Kali Kolsson (Kingdom of Norway (872–1397)) William the Old (Kingdom of Norway (872–1397)) Magnus Erlingsson (Kingdom of Norway (872–1397)) Erling Skakke (Kingdom of Norway (872–1397)) Eindride the Young (Kingdom of Norway (872–1397)) Jon Petterson Fot	Unknown

Strength
15 ships	Unknown

Rögnvald Kali's Crusade was led by the Norwegian Earl of Orkney, Rögnvald Kali Kolsson as a late wave of the Second Crusade.

== Background ==
The Norwegian crusade in 1152, which is seen as a late wave of the Second Crusade, occurred during the earl's visit to Norway in 1150. According to the sagas, Earl Ragnvald was invited to Norway by the supporters of the King, Inge Haraldsson during increasing internal pressure between the three brothers and co-rulers Inge, Eystein and Sigurd. This was according to the sagas an attempt to strengthen the bond between Ragnvald and Inge's faction so that the earl “might be a dearer friend of Inge than of his brother”.

In the summer of 1150, Ragnvald and King Inge met at the king's court. During Ragnvald's stay a man named Eindride 'the Young' who was a noble and a lendman and had for a long times served in the Varangian Guard in Constantinople who brought back news from the Holy Land where it's thought that he mentioned the loss of Edessa and the possibility of a Second Crusade. Eindride said to the Earl of Orkney: “it would best suit such men as you are to be there on account of your great accomplishments, and you will be honoured above all others wherever you come among noblemen".

His speech convinced Ragnvald to pick up the cross and go on a crusade. Erling Skakke was also present, and held a long speech in support of a crusade and along with many nobles he agreed to partake in his Crusade. It was also arranged that all participants should use two years to prepare for the crusade by building ships and gathering supplies. Among the participants were the lendmen Jon Petterson Fot and Eindride the Young along with the bishop of Orkney, William the Old.

== The Crusade ==
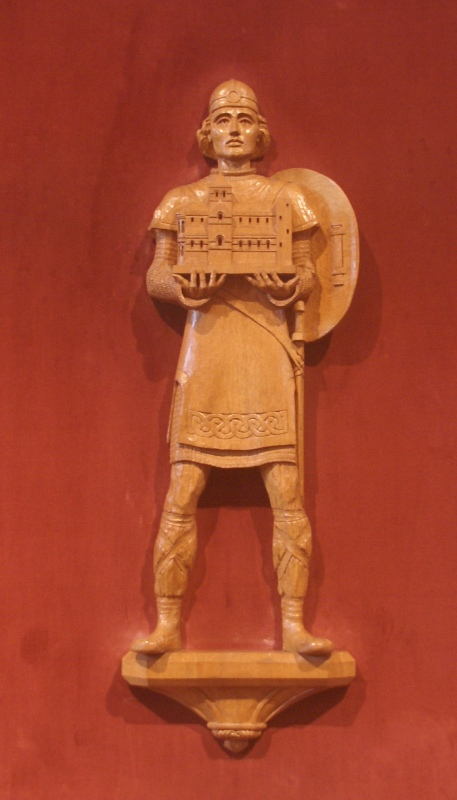
Modern carving of Rögnvald in St Magnus Cathedral, Orkney

The Norwegian Crusaders sailed from Norway with 15 large ships before setting sail towards Holy land. On the way there they would encounter and capture a Muslim ship named Dromund off the coast of Spain. On their way they would also travel to southern France where they would stop at Narbonne and encounter Ermengarde, Viscountess of Narbonne known for her patronage of troubadours. When they arrived to the Holy Land in the spring of 1154 the Second Crusade had already ended. During a battle against Arab Muslims around Sicily, Erling Skakke was cut in the neck with a sword during the boarding of a Muslim ship. This caused him from then on to tilt his head to one side ("skakke" means slanted). Which led him to be nicknamed "Erling Skakke".

After the crusade many of the Norwegians arriving in Constantinople, including Erling Skakke and Eindride the Young served years in Byzantine service in the Varangian Guard before later returning to Norway. When returning to Norway, Erling ended up marrying the daughter of Sigurd the Crusader, Kristin.

== Works cited ==
- Anon., Orkneyinga Saga: The History of the Earls of Orkney, tr. Hermann Pálsson and Paul Edwards. Penguin, London, 1978. ISBN 0-14-044383-5
- Svenungsen, Pål (2013). Kings, Crusades and Competition – The Danish-Norwegian conflict in the 1160s.
- Helle, Knut. "Erling Skakke". snl.no. Great Norwegian Encyclopedia.
- Svenungsen, Pål (2016). Norge og korstogene. En studie av forbindelsene mellom det norske riket og den europeiske korstogsbevegelsen, ca.1050-1380.
- Thuesen, Nils Petter; Norseng, Per G. "Ragnvald Kale den hellige". snl.no. Great Norwegian Encyclopedia.
