= Battle of Blidebro =

1342 battle in Denmark

- Part of the Kalundborg War
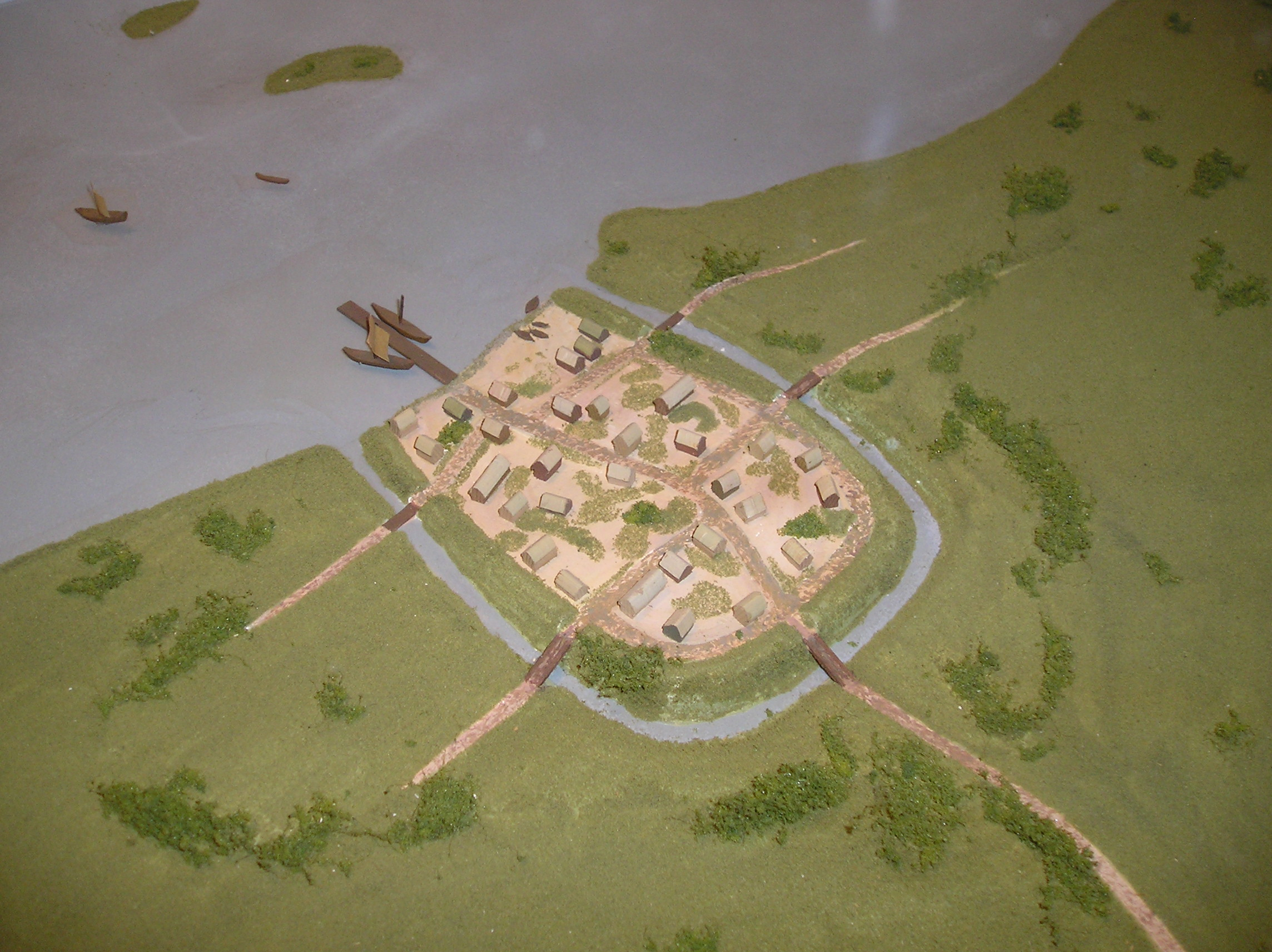
- Model of Copenhagen as it probably looked like in the 12th Century, by the Museum of Copenhagen.
Date	26 June 1342
Location	Near Copenhagen, Zealand 55°40′46″N 12°35′45″E
Result	Danish victory
Territorial changes	Swedes are driven out of Copenhagen and surrounding areas

Belligerents
Denmark; Hanseatic League	Sweden; Holstein-Rendsburg

Commanders and leaders
(Medieval Denmark) Frederick of Lochen	Markvard Stove

Units involved
Unknown	(History of Sweden (800–1521)) Copenhagen garrison

Strength
(Medieval Denmark) 150–200 knights ships	Unknown amount of men and ships

Casualties and losses
Unknown	(History of Sweden (800–1521)) 350 killed

The Battle of Blidebro (Danish: Slaget ved Blidebro, Swedish: Slaget vid Blidebro) was a battle between Danish–German and Swedish–Holsteinian forces near Copenhagen in 1342 during the Kalundborg War. The battle ended in a Danish–German victory and it is estimated that 350 Swedes were killed in the initial action.

== Background ==
In 1340, Valdemar IV of Denmark became king of a Denmark that was mortgaged to foreign powers, and Valdemar now set about to reunite Denmark.

The following year, 1341, Copenhagen and its surrounding areas were sold to Valdemar's enemy, Magnus Eriksson of Sweden, for 7,000 silver marks. In early Summer of 1342, Valdemar began besieging the Swedish fortification, however, the besieged enjoyed reinforcements of boats and manpower from both Magnus Eriksson and the German count, Markvard Stove.

== Battle ==
However, now the knight, Frederick of Lochen, together with ships from the Hanseatic League, tried his luck in attacking the Swedish and Holstenian reinforcements at Blidebro on 26 June 1342. It became a bloody and tough battle. The battle ended in a complete Danish victory and the first major victory for Valdemar IV. Of the Swedish troops, it is said that 350 were left on the battlefield, including many chieftains, while the rest of the force deserted or fled to Vordingborg.

== Aftermath ==
Because of his complete victory, Frederick of Lochen did not dare to stay in Denmark and left for Germany with gifts. However, this cannot have been immediately after the battle, since he is mentioned being in Kalundborg on 10 August 1342.

== Place ==
It seems that the battle started at Refshalegrunden (near present-day Trekroner Fort) and thereafter drawn to the water between Zealand and Amager. However, it is uncertain weather the battle took place at land or at sea.

== Legacy ==
The battle is later remembered in Copenhagen's Church of Our Lady's obituary as the Battle of Blidebro.

== Works cited ==
- Bøgh, Anders (2024). "Valdemar Atterdag, ca. 1321-1375". danmarkshistorien.dk (in Danish).
- Reinhardt, Christian (1880). Valdemar Atterdag og hans Kongegjerning (in Danish). Gad. p. 443.
- Mollerup, V. (1875). Friedreick von Lochen (in Danish).
- Nielsen, O. (1879). Kjøbenhavns historie og beskrivelse (PDF) (in Danish). Gads.
