= Vårbelgers =

"Vårbelger" was the name for Skule Bårdssons supporters during his rebellion against king Håkon Håkonsson in 1239–1240. Earlier the name "vårbelger" had been seen as a "herd" which in 1190 rose up against king Sverre under a pretended son of Magnus Erlingsson.

== Etymology ==
The word probably means "spring skin", i.e. fur of poor quality, and was probably a derogatory epithet based on the flock's poor clothing.

== Description ==
The first was a flock under an alleged son of Magnus Erlingsson who rebelled against Sverre Sigurdsson around 1190. Little is known about this flock; there does not appear to have been a widespread rebellion.

The other, which is the one most often referred to, was, as mentioned, Duke Skule's flock. They followed him when he paid homage at Øyrating in Trøndelag in 1239, and fought with him during the battle in Oslo against Håkon IV Håkonsson in 1240. There they suffered a crushing defeat, and the few who remained of the pack dispersed or followed Skule to Elgeseter monastery in Nidaros. Several of the survivors from Oslo were killed together with Skule when the monastery was attacked by Håkon Håkonsson's men.

== Sources ==
- Vårbelger i Store norske leksikon
- Skule Bårdsson i Norsk biografisk leksikon
