= Pietro Moriconi =

Italian bishop

Pietro Moriconi (died 1119) was the Archbishop of Pisa from 1105, succeeding Dagobert. According to tradition he belonged to the noble lineage of Moriconi of Vico. He first appears as archbishop in a document of 19 March 1106, and is credited with strengthening the Pisan church. On 13 April 1113, he preached a crusade against the Balearic Islands to free captive Christians there. He went to Rome to receive Pope Paschal II's blessing for the expedition, which he also helped lead in person. He interfered to quash peace negotiations that ran counter to Pisa's interests. He died in 1119 (Pisan calendar), and was buried on 10 September in the Pisan Duomo.
