= Norwegian Crusade =

Crusade from Norway to the Holy Land via Iberia (1107–1111)

- Part of the Crusades (aftermath of First Crusade)
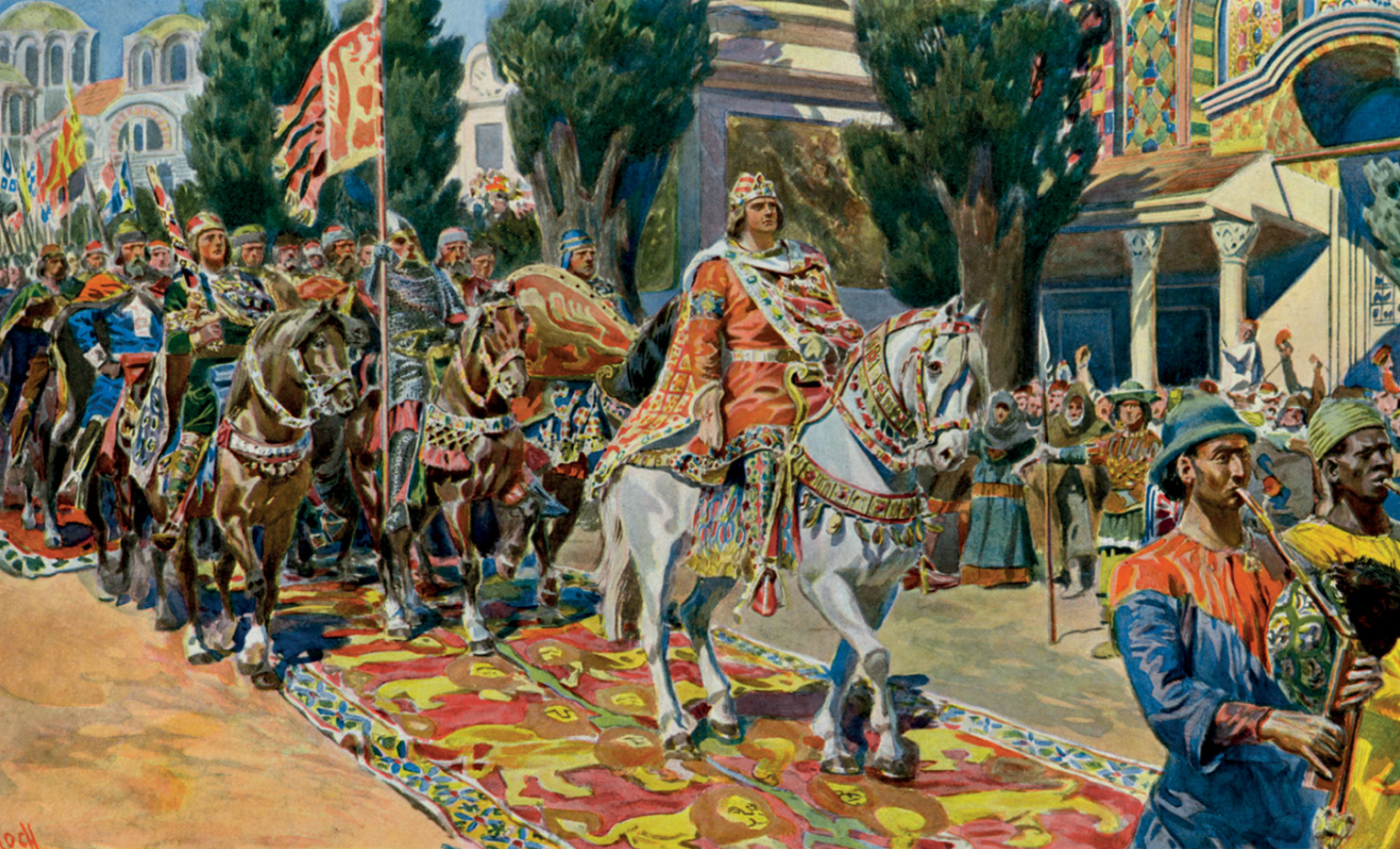
- Sigurd entering Constantinople, by Andreas Bloch (1860–1917)
Date	1107–1110
Location	Iberia, Balearic Islands, Southern Levant
Result	Crusader victory, Lordship of Sidon created

Belligerents
(Kingdom of Norway (872–1397)) Kingdom of Norway; Kingdom of Jerusalem; Republic of Venice; Supported by: Byzantine Empire	Fatimid Caliphate; Almoravid dynasty Zirid dynasty Taifa of Majorca	Kingdom of Galicia (Raid on Santiago de Compostela)

Commanders and leaders
Baldwin I of Jerusalem; Sigurd I of Norway; Ordelafo Faliero	Governor of Sidon (Note: The Fatimids would very often leave the responsibility of defending a city in the hands of a governor, as they did when Jerusalem was taken by the crusaders.)	Unknown

Strength
Norwegians: 5,000 men; 60 galleys; Franks: Numerous troops and Siege engines; Venetians: A fleet of ships, strength unknown	Fatimids: Unknown	Unknown

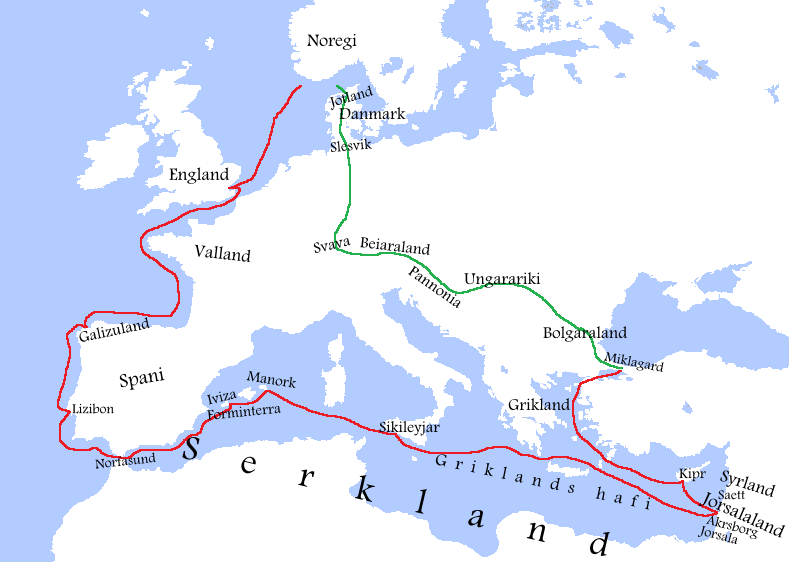
The route taken by Sigurd I to Jerusalem and Constantinople (red line) and back to Norway (green line), according to the Heimskringla Old Norse legend

The Norwegian Crusade, led by Norwegian king Sigurd I, was a crusade that lasted from 1107 to 1111, in the aftermath of the First Crusade. The Norwegian Crusade marks the first time a European king personally went to the Holy Land.

== Journey to Jerusalem ==
=== From Norway to England (1107–08) ===
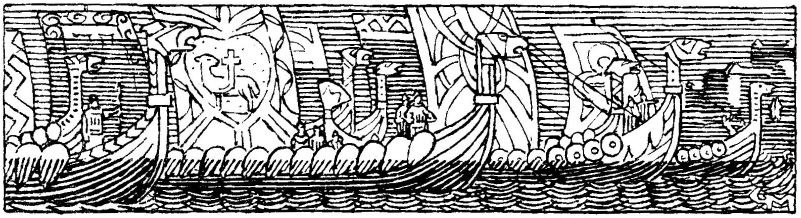
King Sigurd is leaving his country by Gerhard Munthe (1899)

Sigurd and his men sailed from Norway in the autumn of 1107 with 60 ships and around 5,000 men. He soon arrived in England, where Henry I was king. Sigurd and his men stayed there the entire winter until the spring of 1108, when they set sail southwards.

=== Iberia (1108–09) ===
After several months they came to Santiago de Compostela (Jakobsland) in the Kingdom of Galicia (Galizuland) where they were allowed by a local lord to stay for the winter. However, when the winter came there was a shortage of food, which caused the lord to refuse to sell food and goods to the Norwegians. Sigurd gathered his army, attacked the lord's castle and looted what they could there. The identity of the local lord or count is uncertain.

In the spring of 1109, they continued along the coast of Portugal, capturing eight Saracen galleys on their way, and conquered a castle at Sintra (probably referring to Colares, which is closer to the sea), after which they continued to Lisbon, a "half Christian and half heathen" city, said to be on the dividing line between Christian and Muslim Iberia, where they won another battle. On their continued journey they sacked the town of Alkasse (probably Alcácer do Sal), and on their way into the Mediterranean, near the Strait of Gibraltar (Norfasund), met and defeated a Muslim squadron.

The Siege of Lisbon in 1109 marked a significant chapter in their expedition. Positioned as a pivotal point between Christian and Muslim territories, the raiders confronted the diverse cultural and religious landscape of the Iberian Peninsula. Their triumph in Lisbon was one of many on their way to the Holy Land.

=== Balearic Islands (1109) ===
After entering the Mediterranean (Griklands haf) they sailed along the coast of the land of the Saracens (Serkland) to the Balearic Islands. The Balearics were at the time perceived by Christians to be nothing more than a pirate haven and slaving centre. The Norwegian raids are also the first recorded Christian attacks on the Islamic Balearic Islands (though smaller attacks certainly had occurred).

They arrived at Formentera, where they encountered a great number of blámenn (blue men) and Serkir (Saracens) who had taken up their dwelling in a cave. The description of the ensuing battle is the most detailed episode in the written sources of the entire crusade. After this battle, the Norwegians supposedly gained the greatest treasures they had ever acquired. They then went on to successfully attack Ibiza and Menorca. The Norwegians seem to have avoided attacking the largest of the Balearic Islands, Majorca, most likely because it was at the time the most prosperous and well-fortified centre of an independent taifa kingdom. Tales of their success may have inspired the Catalan–Pisan conquest of the Balearics in 1113–1115.

=== Sicily (1109–10) ===
In the spring of 1109, they arrived at Sicily (Sikiley), where they were welcomed by the ruling count, Roger II, who was 12–13 years old at the time.

=== Kingdom of Jerusalem (1110) ===
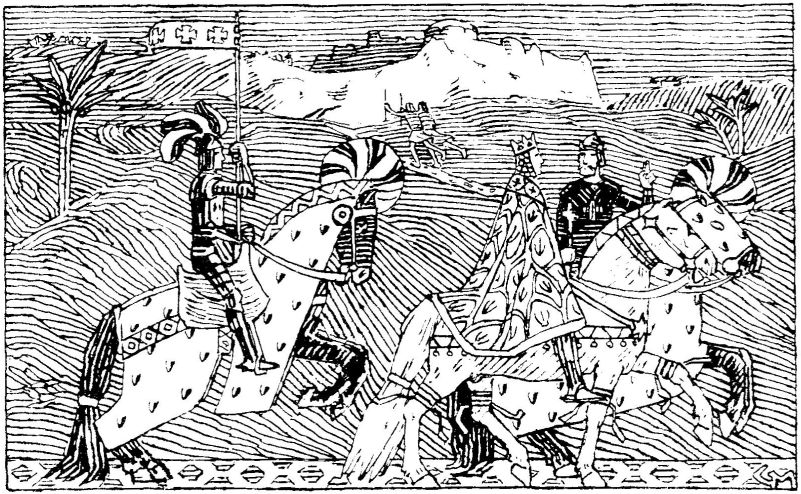
King Sigurd and King Baldwin ride from Jerusalem to the river Jordan by Gerhard Munthe (1899)

In the summer of 1110, they arrived at the port of Acre (Akrsborg) or perhaps in Jaffa, and went to Jerusalem (Jórsalir), where they met King Baldwin I. They were warmly welcomed, and Baldwin rode together with Sigurd to the Jordan River and back again to Jerusalem.

The Norwegians were given many treasures and relics, including a splinter of the True Cross Jesus had allegedly been crucified on. This was given on the condition that they would continue to promote Christianity and bring the relic to the burial site of Saint Olaf.

Sigurd and his men accompanied Baldwin in the siege of Sidon. The siege resulted in Sidon being taken and the subsequent creation of the Lordship of Sidon.

== Journey back to Norway ==
After this, Sigurd and his men sailed to Constantinople (Old Norse: Miklagarðr), where they celebrated together with the Byzantine Emperor Alexios I Komnenos. The Byzantines usually had a negative view of Crusaders. Sigurd was provided both economic and diplomatic support for his crusade, and after the celebrations Sigurd left all of his ships and valuable figureheads as well as many of his men, before making his way back to Norway by land, where he arrived in 1111.

== Bibliography ==
- Bergan, Halvor (2005). Kong Sigurds Jorsalferd 1108-1111: Den unge kongen som ble Norges helt ('King Sigurd Jorsalfare. The young king who became Norway's hero', in Norwegian). Norgesforlaget. ISBN 82-91986-75-4
- Morten, Øystein (2014) Jakten på Sigurd Jorsalfare (Spartacus) ISBN 9788243008441
- Riley-Smith, Jonathan (1986). "The Crusade of 1101". The First Crusade and the Idea of Crusading. (University of Pennsylvania Press). p. 132. ISBN 0812213637.
- Riant, Paul (1865–1869). Expéditions et pèlerinages des Scandinaves en Terre sainte au temps des croisades (in French), 2 volumes. Chapter IV: Croisade de Sigurd I, pp. 173–215.
- Sigurd Magnússon. In Independent Crusaders Project, Fordham University (2021).
