= Erling Skakke =

Norwegian nobleman (1115–1179)

Erling Ormsson (1115 – 18 June 1179), known as Erling Skakke, was a Norwegian Jarl during the 12th century. He was the father of Magnus Erlingsson, who reigned as King of Norway from 1161 to 1184.

== Biography ==
Erling Ormsson was born at Etne in the county of Hordaland, Norway. He was the son of Kyrpinga Orm Sveinsson. He earned his reputation crusading with Rögnvald Kali Kolsson, the Earl of Orkney in the Mediterranean from 1152 to 1155. Erling first sailed to the Holy Land, then Constantinople, and lastly visited Rome. During a battle with Arab warriors on Sicily a sword-wielding Arab cut Erling in the neck. This caused him from then on to tilt his head to one side ("skakke" means slanted). He was married to Kristin Sigurdsdatter, the daughter of King Sigurd Jorsalfar.

Erling was the guardian of King Inge I of Norway and was one of the leaders of the Lendman Party (lendmannspartiet) after King Inge's death in 1161. Erling Skakke managed to have elected his son, Magnus Erlingsson as the king of Norway in 1161 and crowned in 1163, at the age of eight. Erling took the title of Jarl and held the real power since Magnus was a minor.

In 1166, Sigurd Agnhatt and his foster son Olav Ugjæva raised a force in Oppland, and had Olav proclaimed king, while earl Erling Skakke was away in Denmark. Olav was the son of Maria Øysteinsdotter, the daughter of former King Øystein Magnusson. After Erling returned to Norway to fight this uprising, Olav and his men attacked Erling in an ambush at Rydjokul in Sørum. Erling was wounded and barely escaped. In 1168 Olav and his men ventured south to the Oslofjord area, but were there defeated in battle at Stanger in Våler i Solør. Sigurd was killed in the battle, but Olav escaped and went to Denmark.

When Sverre Sigurdsson became the leader of the Birkebeiner, Erling's position was compromised, and he fell at the Battle of Kalvskinnet outside Nidaros in 1179. King Sverre honoured his fallen opponent by giving a speech at his funeral in the church. Erling was a talented man, but he was not always known for noble qualities. His enemies were ruthless, especially when it concerned their own position and that of their sons. In 1164, he founded Halsnøy Abbey, a monastery of Augustinian Canons, on the island of Halsnøya on the Hardangerfjord.

== See also ==
- Civil war era in Norway

== Other sources ==
- Sigurdsson, Jon Vidar (2008) Det norrøne samfunnet (Oslo: forlaget Pax) ISBN 978-82-530-3147-7
- Finlay, Alison (2004) Fagrskinna, a Catalogue of the Kings of Norway (Brill Academic) ISBN 978-90-041-3172-9
