= Siege of Lisbon (1109) =

Norwegian siege of Muslim Lisbon

- Part of the Norwegian Crusade
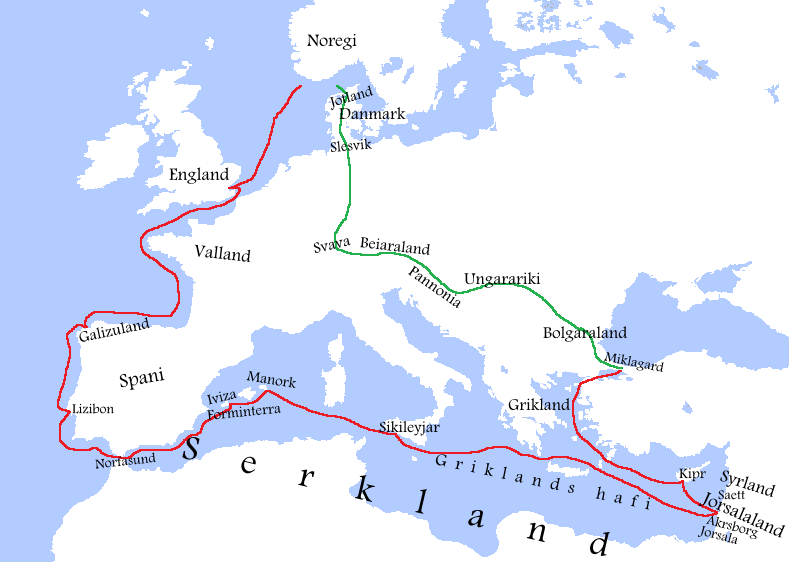
- Map of the route taken during the Norwegian Crusade
Date	1109
Location	Lisbon
Result	Norwegian victory
Territorial changes	Kingdom of León takes control of Lisbon

Belligerents
Kingdom of Norway	Almoravid Empire; Taifa of Badajoz

Commanders and leaders
Sigurd I of Norway	Unknown

Strength
60 ships	Unknown

Casualties and losses
Low	Unknown, high

The siege of Lisbon (Norwegian: Beleiringen av Lisboa) was a military campaign and siege at the city of Lisbon in 1109, with the Norwegian Realm fighting the Iberian Muslims in and around the city. The Norwegians eventually won, suffering very low casualties. The siege in particular had a significant impact on Lisbon because of the ongoing Christian and Muslim conflicts on the Iberian Peninsula.

== Background ==
In 1109 a Norwegian fleet of 60 ships entered Lisbon through the Tagus river under the command of Sigurd I of Norway. There, they would eventually besiege the city and hand it over to the Christian Kingdom of León through their vassal and Henry, Count of Portugal.

== Siege ==
Although much of the actual siege is unknown, it is described as a vast and bloody battle. The walls were broken by catapults, with the Norwegian army suffering few casualties and, with Sigurd the Crusader at its head, seizing and plundering the city. The siege and raid on the Muslim city is often referred to as Sigurd's third victory during his crusade. It is often recognised as having had a major impact on the Reconquista.

== Aftermath ==
It is unknown how much Sigurd's siege contributed to the Reconquista, although much suggests an impact, with scholars even referring to the Norse raids on Iberia and the Balearic Islands as part of the larger history of Islamic Iberia. Some of the men that were captured in the siege were baptized afterwards. The king took what he could carry before leaving the city to continue the Crusade. He would later go on to attack the Barbary pirates of Majorca before continuing his journey to Sicily.

Shortly after the siege, the city was handed over to the Kingdom of León through Henry, Count of Portugal. Evidence points to there being some sort of agreement between Sigurd and Count Henry; however, there are no direct records of the alliance. (Note: Bjarni Aðalbjarnarson (1951, 242-43, nn. 189, 190) mentioned in his edition of Heimskringla that Sigurd probably had some sort of agreement with Count Henry of Portugal, an idea followed by Theodore Andersson and Kari Ellen Gade (2000, 452, n.9)) It is most likely not a coincidence of events, since Henry captured Sintra at least once in 1109. This suggests coordination between the two leaders, though pure chance should not be ruled out.

== Bibliography ==
- Aðalbjarnarson, Bjarni (1951). Heimskringla: History of the Kings of Norway, 3rd edn. Hið íslenzka fornritafélag.
- Bergan, Halvor (2005). Kong Sigurds Jorsalferd. Den unge kongen som ble Norges helt. Norgesforlaget. ISBN 82-91986-75-4
