= Uplands, Norway =

Coordinates: 60.7953°N 11.0827°E

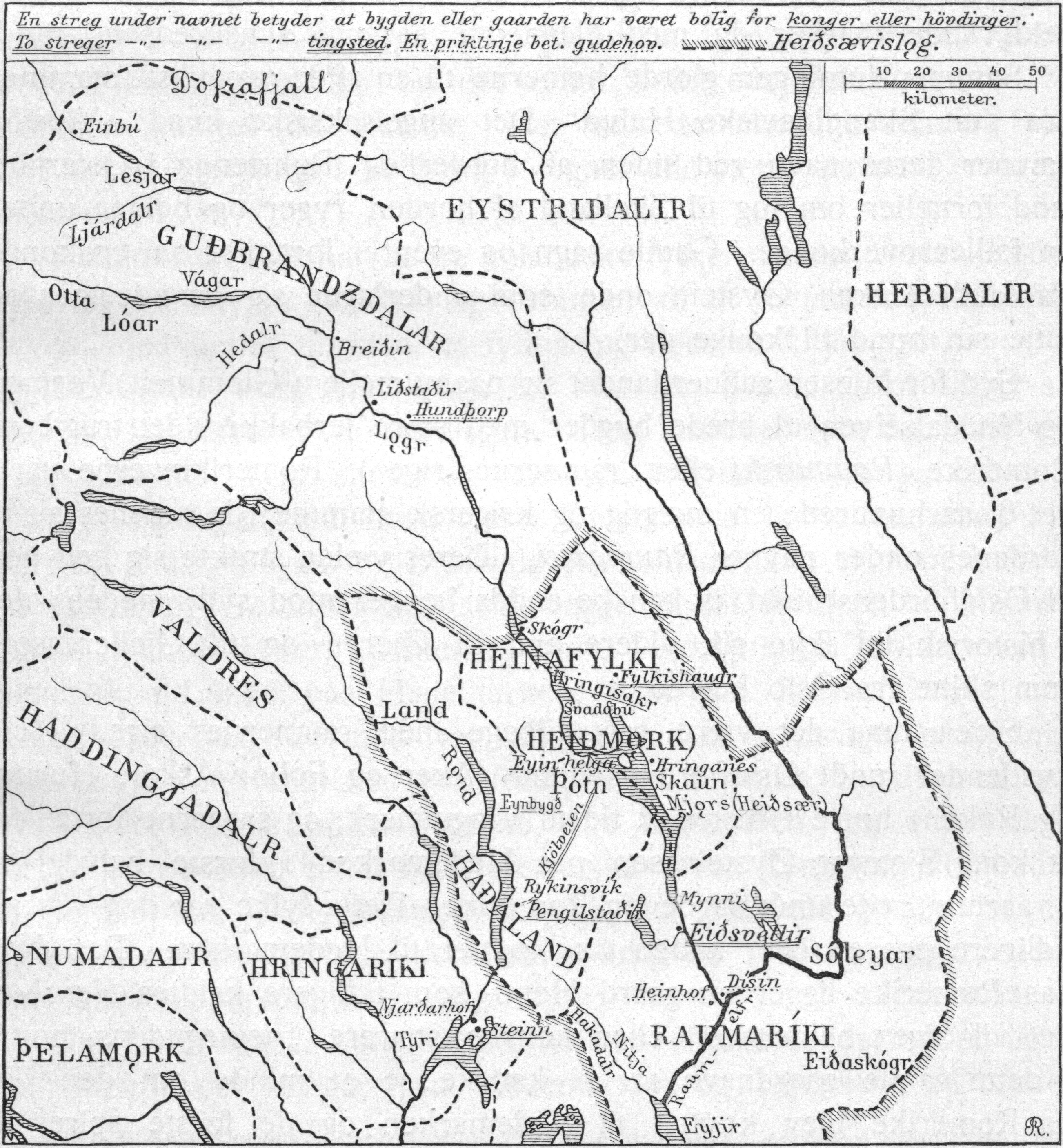
Map over the Uplands, drawn by Ivar Refsdal.

The Uplands (Old Norse: Upplǫnd, Norwegian: Opplanda), is an ancient name for the agricultural lands and forest regions to the north of Oslo in Norway. The term generally included the districts Romerike, Ringerike, Hedmarken, Toten, Hadeland and Land. To the north, these lands branched out through valleys to the districts Gudbrandsdalen, and Østerdalen, which often were counted as part of the Uplands as well. It has also been implied that the districts Hallingdal, Numedal, Valdres, and Telemark were also included.

Innlandet was one of several names proposed for a future administrative region consisting of Hedmark and Oppland. The two counties were re-merged in January 2020 after having been split in 1781 (then called Hedemarkens amt and Kristians amt, respectively).

== History ==
In the Viking Age, Oppland was also an administrative unit ruled by kings:

- Eystein, father of Åsa who married Halfdan Hvitbeinn (see Ynglinga Saga, paragraph 49)
- Halfdan "the Aged" Sveidasson (c. 750)
- Ivar Halfdansson (c. 770)
- Eystein "Glumra (the Noisy)" Ivarsson, son-in-law of Ragnvald Heidumhære and father of Ragnvald Eysteinsson (788)

== See also ==
- Oppland
