= Kalundborg War =

War between Sweden and Denmark

- Part of Dano-Swedish War
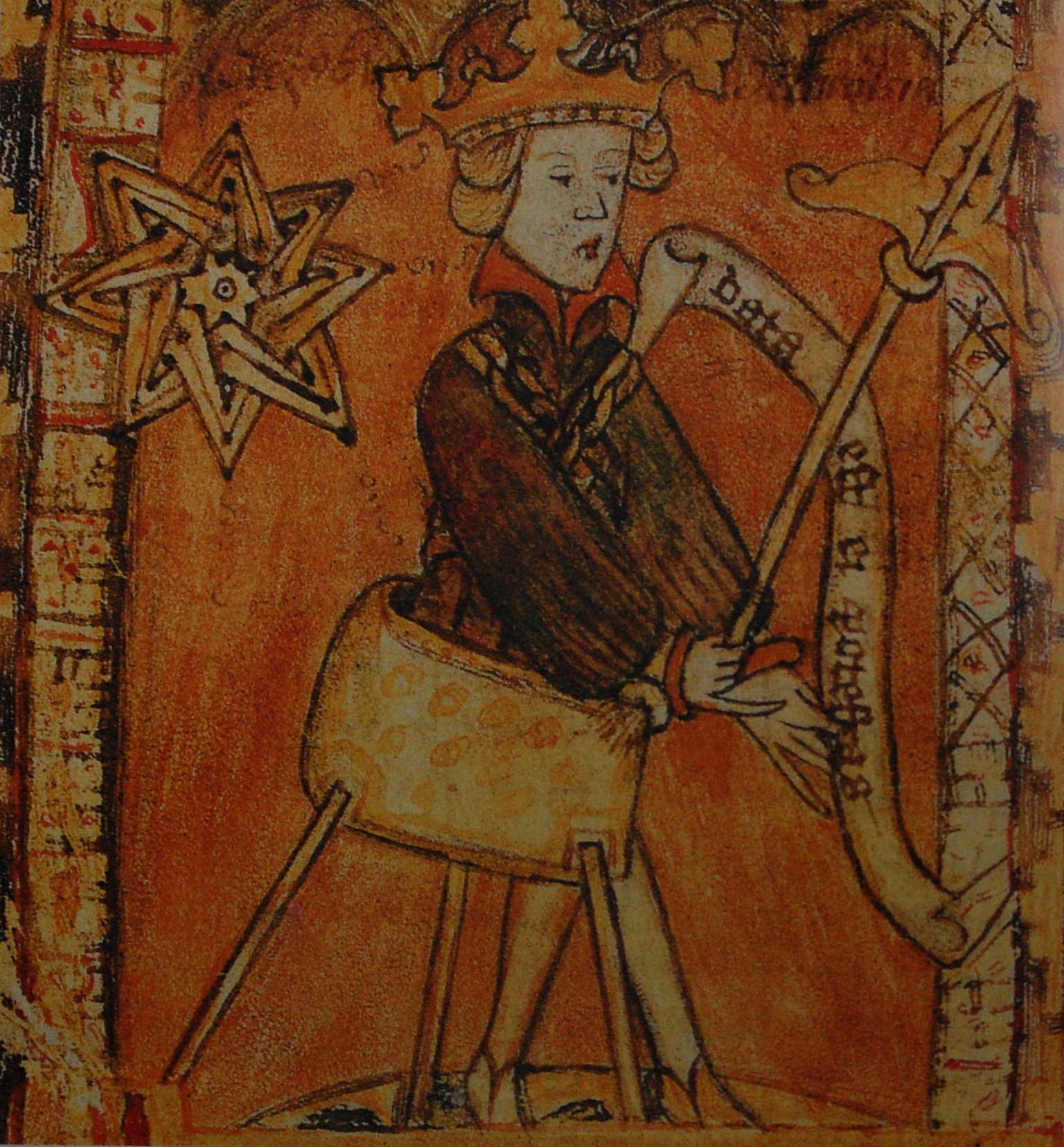
- King Magnus Eriksson IV of Sweden, VII of Norway, as seen on the title page of his Swedish national law.
| Date | 1341–1343 |
| Location | Denmark |
| Result | Swedish-Holsteinian victory |
| Territorial changes | Valdemar admits his sale of Scania, Blekinge, and Halland to Magnus.; Valdemar waives the right of repurchase that had previously applied to the Swedish purchase of the provinces; Magnus renounces all claims west of the Sound. |

Belligerents
| (History of Sweden (800–1521)) Sweden (Kingdom of Norway (872–1397)) Norway; Holstein | (Medieval Denmark) Denmark; Lübeck; Rostock; Hamburg; Stralsund; Wismar; Greifswald |

Commanders and leaders
| Magnus Eriksson | Valdemar IV |

Strength
| Unknown | Unknown |

Casualties and losses
| Unknown | Unknown |

The Kalundborg War was a conflict spanning three years between Sweden, Norway and Holstein, and an alliance consisting of Denmark, Lübeck, Hamburg, Rostock, Wismar, Greifswald, and Stralsund. Although Denmark achieved some victories, the war ended favourably for Sweden, Norway and Holstein.

== Prelude ==
The exact details surrounding this war are quite unclear. The conflict likely arose due to Valdemar IV's ambitions to revive Denmark's past glory after he became king in 1340. When he assumed the throne, the nation was largely under the control of foreign rulers.

== War ==
=== 1341 ===
In 1341, Valdemar IV attacked Holstein and Duchess Ingeborg, Magnus's mother. Valdemar was supported by the Hanseatic cities of Lübeck, Hamburg, Rostock, Wismar, Stralsund and Greifswald, who likely sided with Valdemar to restore the power balance in the north.

The balance of power in the north had been seriously disrupted by the weakness of Denmark and the strength of Magnus's Swedish-Norwegian union. On the Danish front, the Holsteiners succeed in rescuing Kalundborg and the Danes had to lift the siege. A truce was concluded around 22 September between Valdemar, Magnus and Ingeborg. It's likely that Swedish forces did not participate at all or to a very small extent in the battles on during the year, but a truce was nevertheless concluded between Valdemar and Magnus on 25 November.

=== 1342 ===
In 1342, the fighting began again, with active Swedish participation. On June 26, a battle was fought outside Copenhagen between Swedes and Holsteiners and Danes and their Hanseatic allies on the other. The battle ended with a Danish allied victory, 350 Swedes are said to have died in the fighting and many were taken as prisoners to Lubeck. At the time of the battle, Copenhagen Castle was in Swedish hands according to one source, Magnus gained the castle by paying 7,000 marks of silver to a knight named von Plessen.

According to other sources, Copenhagen in its entirety was occupied by Magnus. The further development of the war are unclear. Magnus prepared new forces but in October the Hanseatic cities declared that they were willing to make peace and negotiate. This led to an unsuccessful meeting between Magnus and representatives of the Hanseatic cities on 6 December 1342.

=== 1343 and peace ===
On 17 July, probably through the mediation of Albert II, Duke of Mecklenburg, peace was finally concluded between Sweden and the Hanseatic cities. After the peace treaty, Valdemar IV's situation was worrying, he faced a two-front war with Sweden in the north and Holstein in the south. On November 18, he was forced to make peace on terms favorable to Sweden. Valdemar acknowledged the sale of Scania, Blekinge and Halland from the years 1332 and 1341. He also acknowledged that the full purchase price for the sale has been paid and waives the right of repurchase that previously existed in the purchase. Magnus also renounced all claims west of the Sound. A bond of friendship was also signed between Valdemar and Magnus on the same day.

== Works cited ==
- Nordberg, Michael [in Swedish] (1996). I kung Magnus tid: Norden under Magnus Eriksson: 1317-1374 [In the time of King Magnus: The North under Magnus Eriksson: 1317-1374] (in Swedish). Stockholm: Norstedt. ISBN 9119521227.
