= Forsvarets spesialstyrker =

Armed Forces' Special Command
- Forsvarets spesialstyrker
- Active: 2014-
- Country: Norway
- Type: SEAL (Sea, Air & Land)
- Role: Special operations
- Size: Classified
- Garrison/HQ: Rena Leir
- Engagements: Kosovo conflict Operation Enduring Freedom (Task Force K-Bar); Operation Anaconda; Operation Jacana; International Security Assistance Force; Operation Pickaxe-Handle; Operation Atalanta; Operation Ocean Shield; Resolute Support Mission; American University of Afghanistan attack Hostage situation at Hetal Hotel, Kabul May 2015; 2018 Inter-Continental Hotel Kabul attack 2015 Park Palace guesthouse attack Fall of Kabul (2021)
- Decorations: United States Navy Presidential Unit Citation

Forsvarets spesialstyrker (English: Norwegian Special Operations Command) is a unit in the Norwegian Armed Forces with overall responsibility for the special forces.

The unit was established on 1 January 2014 and consists of the Naval Special Operations Commando (MJK) and the Special Operations Commando (FSK). In addition, 339 Special Operations Aviation Squadron (from the Royal Norwegian Air Force) is operationally under the command of the unit.

== Background ==
Armed Forces' Special Command were created as an operational unit to replace the special operations department in the Defense Staff.

The two units (FSK and MJK) in the command have tasks related to national military preparedness, as well as international operations. They can, upon request, assist civil authorities in domestic counterterrorist operations.

The unit's management and staff are based at Akershus Fortress in Oslo, while Marinejegerkommandoen is based at Haakonsvern Naval Base in Bergen and Forsvarets spesialkommando is based at Camp Rena, eastern Norway, though both units have several training facilities across the country.

== Mission ==
The Armed Forces' Special Command mission is threefold:

- National defence
- Support for other sectors
- Contribution to international operations

== Command ==
Commanding officers since establishment in 2014

- 1 January 2014–1 September 2017: Rear Admiral Nils Johan Holte
- 1 September 2017–27 April 2022: Major General Torgeir Gråtrud
- 27 April 2022– 6 May 2022: Rear Admiral Christian Harstad (acting)
- 6 May 2022–12 May 2026 : Major General Joar Eidheim
- 12 May 2026-: Counter admiral Trond Gimmingsrud.
