= Norwegian special forces and elite units =

Norwegian special force units

Norway has many active special operations and elite units, with those being Forsvarets Spesialkommando (FSK), Marinejegerkommandoen (MJK), Kystjegerkommandoen (KJK), mine-divers and the parachute unit Fallskjermjegerkommandoen (the parachute soldier command). The FSK is the army special forces unit and the Norwegian equivalent to the US Delta Force; the MJK are the maritime special forces unit being the Norwegian equivalent to the Navy SEALS. The KJK are coastal rangers.

In 2014, Forsvarets Spesialstyrker (FS) was established to coordinate the FSK and MJK, in a similar vein to the American Joint Special Operations Command. These forces have the highest readiness state in most national and international situations. Also attached to FS is the 339 Special Operations Air Squadron (339 SOAS), which assists with air mobility.

== Army special forces and elite units ==
=== Forsvarets spesialkommando ===
The FSK consists of two main parts. The first part, "Spesialjegere" (special rangers), is the operational segment. The second is the conscript phase (førstegangstjeneste), which consists of the Fallskjermjegere (paratroopers), who have their own section. FSK was established in 1982 due to increasing terror threats, and became operational in 1984. It originally consisted of the best soldiers from MJK and Fallskjermjegere/HJK. For several years, the government kept FSK secret, and denied its existence until 1999.

Today, anyone who has completed førstegangstjenesten can apply to become a Spesialjeger, but the force still includes many operators from Fallskjermjegere and MJK. FSK's base is in Rena Leir, with training facilities across Norway. They specialize in hostage rescue, direct action, SERE (Survival, Evasion, Resistance, and Escape), sabotage, arctic warfare, air operations, CQB (Close Quarters Battle), and reconnaissance, among other tasks.

==== Selection and training ====
Selection for FSK is one of the toughest in the world, lasting around five weeks. It demands exceptional mental and physical endurance, including marches of 100+ km in a day, very little sleep and food, swimming in cold temperatures, and intense mental challenges. The selection pass rate is estimated between 0.5% and 5%. Many FSK operators have a fallskjermjeger or MJK background, but exact figures are classified. Successful candidates undergo 1 to 2.5 years of training covering: skydiving fastrope, SERE, navigation, Arctic, urban, and jungle warfare; as well as sabotage, boat operations and medical courses. They have been known to parachute onto oil rigs, an action once called a "suicide mission" by SAS members.

FSK is highly secretive. They have trained and worked with elite units such as the SAS, Navy SEALs, SBS, KSK, GIGN, Delta Force, DEVGRU, Green Berets, JTF2, SOG, SASR, and others. The FSK is considered the best in Arctic warfare and had a 100% mission success rate in Afghanistan, praised alongside MJK and HJK.

==== Known casualties ====
A known casualty took place overseas. It was Tor Arne Lau-Henriksen, who died in 2007 after being killed by a Taliban member disguised as a civilian. There have been other deaths during training and selection, though most details remain secret.

=== Fallskjermjegerkommandoen (FSK) ===
Fallskjermjegertroppen (paratroopers) are part of FSK's conscription phase. Their roots date back to World War II, when Kompani Linge parachuted into Norwegian wilderness to sabotage a German heavy water plant, an operation called "Operation Gunnerside" that may have prevented Germany from acquiring nuclear weapons. HJK (Hærens Jegerkommando), was established in 1962 to train parachutists and army rangers. Many secrets surround HJK, so there is little that is publicly known.

When FSK was created, HJK was integrated as HJK/FSK but still operated separately. During the Afghanistan invasion (2001–2006), and the Kosovo conflict, HJK soldiers were trained like special rangers. In 2006, HJK was disbanded to reduce confusion, among other reasons.

==== Selection and training ====
Selection for Fallskjermjeger is the toughest among conscripts, with only about 1% making it through (according to a 2013 max insider documentary). Selection includes long marches, intense physical exercise, sleep deprivation, and minimal food (generally only nuts and small snacks). Some reports suggest that during "Hell Week", an average soldier loses 7–12 kg and gets 1–2 hours of total sleep. Training includes navigation, CQB, sabotage, reconnaissance, parachuting, and diving. It serves as a stepping stone to becoming a Spesialjeger.

Fallskjermjeger soldiers are experts in reconnaissance, sabotage, survival, working behind enemy lines, and intelligence gathering. They are skilled climbers, winter warfare specialists, and parachuting experts.

==== Known casualties ====
Rasmus Alme, who saved many during the Åsa train derailment, died in 2005 during an exercise in the Oslofjord.

==== All-female unit ====
The Ranger Platoon, or "Jegertroppen", is a unit that exclusively admits women. They were created in 2014 as a three-year experiment, and were declared a success and made a permanent unit in 2017. In terms of structure and training it is similar to the Fallskjermjeger unit. The selection rate for the Jegertropp was 0.7% in 2015.

== Naval special forces and elite units ==
=== Marinejegerkommandoen (MJK) ===
MJK is responsible for selecting and training Marinejegere (marine rangers). It dates back to 1953 with "Froskemenn" (frogmen). In 1968, the unit split into mine-divers and marine rangers. In 1992, the unit officially became known as MJK. Until 2014, MJK was under the Navy; after that, it was reorganized under FS. MJK trains Marinejegere and Special Boat Operators, who are responsible for insertion of Marinejegere and other independent tasks. Their main base is at Haakonsvern near Bergen. MJK specializes in maritime warfare, CQB, ship boarding, coastal warfare, reconnaissance, jungle warfare and Arctic warfare.

They have worked and trained with units like the Navy SEALs, SBS, DEVGRU, SASR, SOG, SSG, Frømandskorpset, JTF2, KSK, GIGN, SAS, and the Green Berets. MJK specializes in cold, maritime environments..

==== Selection and training ====
MJK training and selection is extremely difficult, and requires completion of conscription beforehand. The process is secretive, but what is known is that it involves intense physical and mental challenges, including swimming and underwater diving in cold conditions. Selection pass rates are estimated at 1–5%. The famous "Helvetesuka" (Hell Week), is physically demanding, with only 3–5 hours of sleep and small amounts of food, like raisins or nuts, over 5–7 days.

Training covers skydiving, reconnaissance, SERE, boat operations, medical courses, marksmanship, diving, and urban warfare.

==== Known casualties ====
Known casualties include Trond Bolle, who died in 2010 from a roadside bomb in Afghanistan, and Magnus Rubach Welt, who died in 2011 during a training exercise near Haakonsvern.

=== Kystjegerkommandoen (KJK) ===
KJK, the Coastal rangers or kysjegerkommandoen, is similar to MJK but focused on different tasks. It is sometimes a stepping stone to MJK. Established in 2001 under the Norwegian Navy, KJK has been operational since 2004. It is available during the conscript phase. In 2006, it was nearly decommissioned due to budget cuts, but remained active.

==== Selection and training ====
KJK selection is considered one of the toughest conscript phases in the Norwegian Army. It involves long marches, and some swimming with limited sleep and food. Approximately 10% pass the selection. Forsvaret released a mini-series called “Operasjon Kystjeger” covering parts of their training and selection.

KJK specializes in reconnaissance, patrols, CQB, boating, and swimming. They operate both in maritime and inland environments. The total service time is about 15 months, after which candidates may join an operational squadron. KJK has trained alongside US Marines and Rangers, and frequently works with MJK. They have operated alongside Norwegian special forces in Afghanistan.

==== Known casualties ====
Known casualties include Andreas Eldjarn, Simen Tokle, Christian Lian, and Marinejeger Trond Bolle, all killed by a roadside bomb in Afghanistan. Another Kystjeger died in an avalanche.

=== Minedykkerkommandoen (MDK) ===
Mine divers (Minedykkerkommandoen) specialize in defusing, planting, and handling bombs. MDK dates back to the frogmen in 1953. It was part of MJK until renamed MDK in 1968, becoming its own unit. Their base is at Haakonsvern near Bergen.

==== Selection and training ====
The selection is similar to MJK, but requires high intelligence. Few candidates make it through due to the specialized and dangerous nature of the job. The physical and mental demands are high, and strong swimming skills are essential due to extensive water training.

MDK specializes in sabotage, demolition, diving, maritime warfare, Arctic warfare, and reconnaissance. Due to the highly secretive nature, the amount of trainees who pass the rigorus examinations is not released publicly, but it is known that few do.
