= Rajesh Tandon =

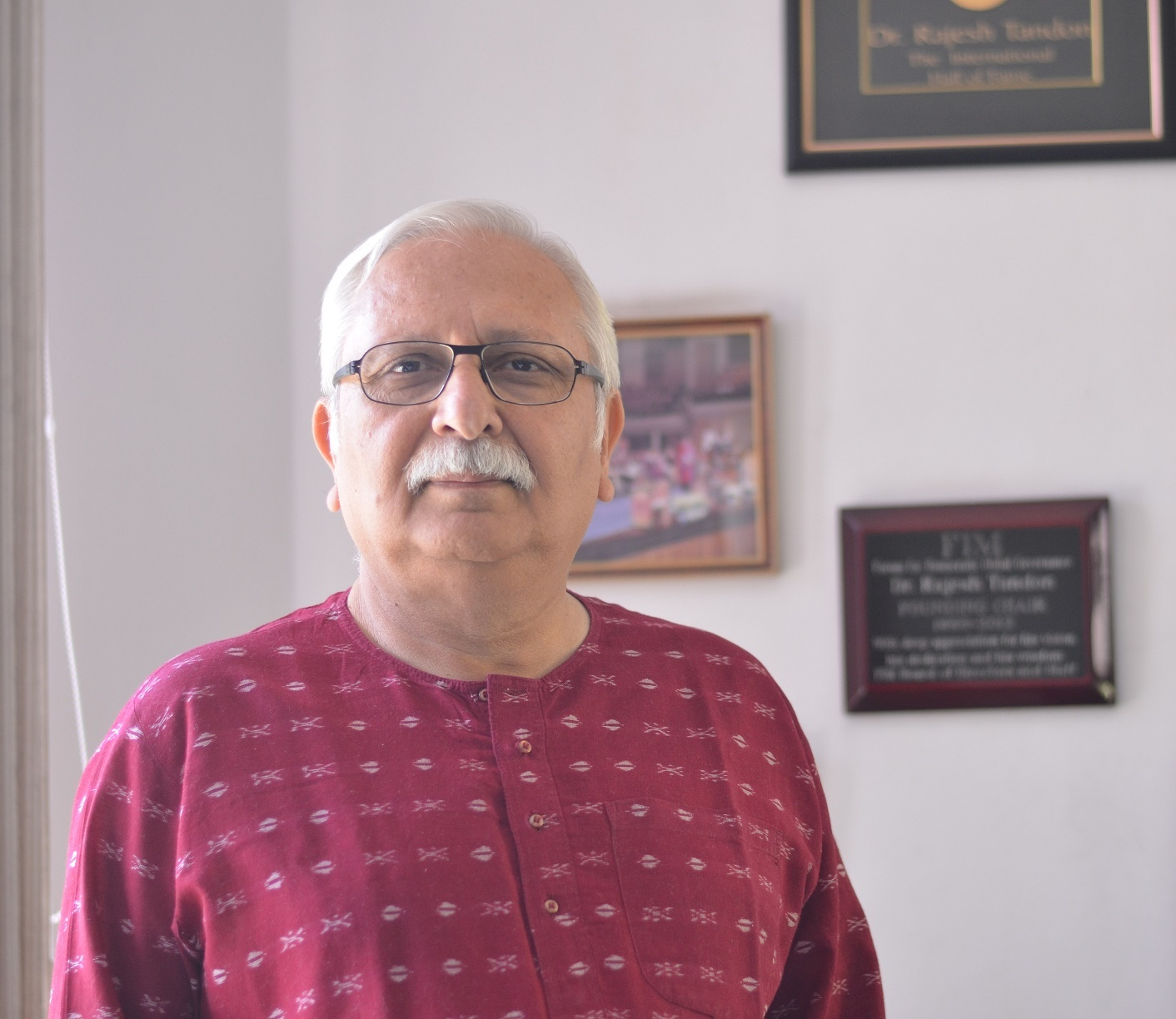
- in PRIA office, New Delhi, 2014
- Born: Kanpur, Uttar Pradesh, India
- Citizenship: India
- Education: B.Tech, MBA, Ph.D.
- Alma mater: Indian Institute of Technology, Kanpur (B.Tech), 1972; Indian Institute of Management, Calcutta (MBA), 1974; Case Western Reserve University (Ph.D.), 1978
- Occupation: Founder of PRIA
- Spouse: Late Kalpana Mehta Late (Dr.) Martha Farrell

Rajesh Tandon (Hindi: राजेश टंडन) is the Founder-President of Participatory Research in Asia (PRIA), a global centre for participatory research & training. His work in this field has focused on relationships between the researcher and researched subjects.

== Early life and education ==
Rajesh Tandon was born in a middle-class family in Kanpur, Uttar Pradesh and did his schooling there. He went to IIT Kanpur to study Electronics Engineer. He completed his post graduation in management from IIM Calcutta. He received his PhD from Case Western Reserve University, Cleveland, United States.

== Career ==
He started his professional career in the development sector as an active intervener in the processes of social change in rural areas of India. While working with villagers on educational training, he observed the power of new learning opportunities in the hands of those who have otherwise been denied such access.

In 1982 he founded the Society for Participatory Research in Asia (PRIA) as a vehicle to strengthen learning opportunities at the grassroots level and to articulate knowledge for wider social influence. He developed participatory training, monitoring, and evaluation methodologies supported by and to enhance adult learning and community knowledge. His contributions revolve around issues of participatory research, advocating for people centered development, policy reform and networking in India, South-Asia and beyond. He has advocated for a self-reliant, autonomous and competent voluntary sector in India and abroad. Building alliances and partnerships among diverse sectors in societal development is another current area of his work.

== Positions of responsibilities ==
He has held various positions of responsibilities within India as well as abroad.

=== 2000 - Present ===
- Co-Chair, UNESCO Chair on Community Based Research and Social Responsibility in Higher Education.
- Chairperson of GACER network. PRIA is also the nodal organization for the South East Asia of the Alliance.The representatives of universities, networks and civil society organizations created The Global Alliance on Community-Engaged Research (GACER) in May 2008. The main objective of the Alliance is to facilitate the sharing of knowledge and information across continents and countries to enable interaction and collaboration to further the application and impact of community-based research for a sustainable just future for the people of the world.
- Chaired session on University - Community Engagement for Societal Change and Development: Possibilities and Challenges at the UNESCO World Conference on Higher Education, 5–8 July 2009 at Paris.
- Chair, External Advisory Committee, Office of Community Based Research (OCBR), University of Victoria, Canada, 2006.
- Chairperson, International Forum on Capacity Building of Southern NGOs, 1998 - 2002.

=== 2000 - 1995 ===
- President Asian-South Pacific Bureau of Adult Education (ASPBAE), New Delhi, 1991 - 2000.

=== 1995 - 1990 ===
- Vice-President, International Council for Adult Education (ICAE), Canada, 1986 - 1994.

== Awards and honors ==
- Awarded Honorary Doctor of Laws Degree by the University of Victoria in 2008 in recognition of his pioneering work in the area of civic engagement, governance and community based research.
- First Indian to be inducted to the International Adult and Continuing Education (IACE) Hall of Fame (class of 2010).
- Awarded Social Justice Medal by National Legal Services Authority and Institute for Gender Justice (2007).
- Named by the United Nations as one of the significant social leaders of our times.
- Winner of Nehru Literacy Award, 2015.

== Books ==
He has authored more than 100 articles, a dozen books and numerous training manuals on themes such as democratic governance, civic engagement, civil society, governance and management of NGOs, participatory research and people-centered development. He has authored/co-authored several books, including

- Community University Research Partnerships: A Global Perspective (2015)
- Global Governance, Civil Society and Participatory Democracy: A View from Below (2014)
- Civil Society and Governance (2003)
- "Reviving Democracy" (2003)
- Voluntary Action, Civil Society and the State (2002)

In addition to these, he has also co-edited several books, including

- Higher Education and Community-Based Research: Creating a Global Vision (2014)
- Globalizing Citizens: New Dynamics of Inclusion and Exclusion (2010)
- Participatory Citizenship: Identity, Exclusion, Inclusion (2006)
- Participatory Research: Revisiting the Roots (2002)

== Personal life ==
He was married to social worker Martha Farrell. She was one of the four Indians killed in the 2015 Park Palace guesthouse attack. An expert on women's empowerment, Farrell was running a series of workshops on "gender mainstreaming" in Afghanistan for locals and government officials.

The Martha Farrell Foundation has been set up to carry forward Martha’s spirit and legacy by advancing her work on gender mainstreaming and adult education, with the overall goal of achieving gender equality in India and around the world.
