= Jegertroppen =

All-female unit of the Norwegian Special Operations Commando

All-female Special Reconnaissance Platoon
- Jegertroppen
- Active: 2014–present
- Country: Norway
- Branch: Norwegian Armed Forces Special Operations Command (Norwegian: Forsvarets spesialstyrker)
- Type: Special operations forces
- Role: Special operations: Special reconnaissance
- Size: Platoon
- Part of: Norwegian Special Operations Commando (Norwegian: Forsvarets spesialkommando)
- Website: https://forsvaret.no/jegertroppen

Jegertroppen (English: The Ranger Platoon; officially the NORSOC all-female Special Reconnaissance Platoon) is an all-female special operations forces unit of the Norwegian Special Operations Commando (NORSOC) (Norwegian: Forsvarets spesialkommando; FSK), part of the Norwegian Armed Forces Special Operations Command (NORSOCOM) (Norwegian: Forsvarets spesialstyrker; FS).

The Ranger Platoon has special reconnaissance (SR) in and around built-up areas as the main focus. The troop was initially created as a one-year pilot program in 2014 by NORSOC that was later extended for another three years and in 2017 was declared a success. It is reported to be the world's first all-female special forces unit.

== Background ==
The Norwegian Armed Forces has conscription for all males who are liable for compulsory military service from the year they turn 19 years of age, until the end of the year in which they reach the age of 44 which was originally introduced in 1897. Following the Second World War, women were allowed to serve as voluntary reservists in 1959, in 1976 this changed to allow entry to regular service in non-combat roles and in 1984 all combat positions became open to women. From 2009, all women were obligated to meet the conscription board, the same as males, however military service remained voluntary. In January 2015, the law changed to extend conscription to women, making Norway the first NATO member and first European country to make military service compulsory for both sexes. The Norwegian Armed Forces have a stated objective of increasing female membership to 20 percent by 2020.

During the War in Afghanistan, NORSOC commanders saw an operational need for female operators who would be able to communicate directly with women to gather intelligence and build community relations as male operators were forbidden from speaking to women due to religious and cultural constraints. The NORSOC had been tasked with mentoring the Afghan Ministry of Interior Affairs Crisis Response Unit (CRU-222) based in Kabul and required female advisers for the CRU and also for arrests to take care of women and children. Women had been eligible for entry into Norwegian Special Operation Forces, against the same male selection criteria, with several making it through the admission process but none had completed the selection phase being unable to compete with the physical strength of the males.

== History ==
In March 2013, planning for the unit began under the code name "Tundra", spearheaded by the former and current heads of the NORSOC, Eirik Kristoffersen and his younger brother Frode Arnfinn Kristoffersen, and the first class began training in June 2014. In 2014, out of 317 applicants for the Ranger Platoon’s founding selection program only 88 passed the selection course with 20 completing the 10 month training program and 13 going on to form the unit in 2015. In 2015, there were 196 applicants, with 37 making it through the selection, 17 completed the training and 14 joined the unit. The majority of applicants have a strong sporting background.

The Ranger Platoon was the subject of a 2016 NRK documentary Jenter for Norge (English: Girls for Norway) for which a camera crew followed trainees for almost the full year of their training. No Ranger Platoon operator has deployed operationally.

== Selection and training ==
Candidates are selected based on attitude and physical fitness, the minimum physical standards are: one pull-up; 20 push-ups; 35 sit-ups in two minutes or less; 20 back extensions; swim 200 metres (660 ft), with no underwater phobia; and perform a 7-kilometre (4.3 mi) road run carrying 22 kilograms (49 lb) in 59 minutes. In addition there are required tests in 10 kilograms (22 lb) medicine ball throw, standing long jump, and 3000-meter run which will not disqualify, but do count towards selection. There is a 3 week pre-selection course learning basic skills before commencing the week long selection course named "hell week" that is a test of mental and physical strength involving long marches over several days with little time for rest, and minimum amounts of food and water.

Applicants then face a 10 month training program that includes a patrol course, survival course, shooting course, communications course, medical course, parachute course, winter training, winter exercise, close combat course, close quarter battle (CQB) course, vehicle course and urban special reconnaissance course culminating in a final exercise. To complete the program, candidates must be able to march 15 km (9 miles) in full gear (22 kilograms (49 lb) backpack, weapon, boots) through forests within two hours and 15 minutes or less; perform 50 sit-ups in two minutes, six pull-ups and 40 push-ups; run 3 kilometres (1.9 mi) in 13 minutes or less; and swim 400 metres (1,300 ft) in 11 minutes or less, the first 25 metres underwater. In the first year, trainees recreated the World War II sinking of SF Hydro during Operation Gunnerside. The unit trains at Rena leir army camp in Rena.
