= Martha Farrell =

Indian civil society leader

- Born: 5 June 1959; New Delhi
- Died: 13 May 2015 (aged 55); Kabul, Afghanistan
- Citizenship: India
- Education: Delhi University (B.A.), 1979; Delhi School of Social Work (MSW), 1981; Jamia Millia Islamia (Ph.D.), 2013
- Occupation: Director of PRIA
- Spouse: Rajesh Tandon
- Children: Suheil Farrell Tandon; Tariqa Farrell Tandon

Martha Farrell was a civil society leader, renowned and respected in India and around the world for her work on women’s rights, gender equality and adult education. She was among 14 people killed in a terrorist attack on a guest house in Kabul, Afghanistan on 13 May 2015. She had been leading a gender training workshop with the Aga Khan Foundation in Kabul at the time of the attack.

== Early life and education ==
Martha was born on 5 June 1959 to Iona and Noel Farrell in Delhi. She studied English literature at Delhi University, and did a Master of Social Work at the Delhi School of Social Work. She completed her PhD from Jamia Millia Islamia in 2013.

== Career ==
She began her career in 1981 as a literacy worker at Ankur, an NGO working for women’s literacy and empowerment in Delhi. She broadened her focus into adult education, where she began her lifelong practice of participatory learning methodology. In 1991, she co-founded Creative Learning for Change, an NGO consisting of development professionals involved in research, training and documentation of learning materials for students, teachers and facilitators in non-formal settings.

Martha formally joined PRIA (Society for Participatory Research in Asia) in 1996, founded by her husband, Dr. Rajesh Tandon. As Director of PRIA’s program on Gender Mainstreaming in Institutions, she trained thousands of grassroots women leaders and professionals from different walks of life on issues related to citizen engagement in local governance, gender mainstreaming and sexual harassment. From 2005 onwards, she led PRIA’s work on distance education, founding and developing PRIA International Academy, the academic wing of the organization. She also taught part-time at the University of Victoria and Royal Roads University in Canada. Martha’s campaign for gender mainstreaming in organizations began in 1998 when the Vishakha Guidelines for the prevention of sexual harassment at workplaces were formulated by the Supreme Court of India.

== Books ==
In 2014, she published the first Indian book on the subject, Engendering the Workplace: Gender Discrimination & Prevention of Sexual harassment in Organizations. She wrote several other books on issues such as Adult Education, Environment, Occupational Health and Safety, Gender mainstreaming, and Women's empowerment.

== Personal life ==
Alongside her professional contributions, Martha supported PRIA.

Amongst Martha's personal characteristics was her ease with people from varied backgrounds. Martha was a considerate friend and support to others, known for her hospitality. The Tandon/Farrell household was often full of guests, laughter, and food.

== Legacy ==
The Martha Farrell Foundation (MFF), The Martha Farrell Memorial Fellowship and Martha Farrell Award for Excellence in Women's Empowerment have been set up to carry forward her pioneering work on gender mainstreaming and adult education, with the overall goal of achieving gender equality in India and around the world. The Foundation supports targeted and practical interventions in areas relevant to her work. This includes gender mainstreaming, gender equality, preventing sexual harassment and violence against women, and continuing education.
