= Norwegian Special Operations Commando =

- Forsvarets spesialkommando
- Norwegian Special Operations Commando Insignia
- Active: 1982–present
- Country: Norway
- Branch: Norwegian Special Operations Command
- Type: Special forces
- Size: Classified
- Garrison/HQ: Camp Rena
- Motto: Thoroughness provides security
- Engagements: Cold War; Bosnian war 1995 Kidnapping of western tourists in Kashmir; Kosovo war Operation Allied Force; Operation Joint Guardian; Incident at Pristina airport 2001 Macedonia conflict Operation Essential Harvest; Task Force K-Bar; Operation Enduring Freedom; Operation Anaconda; Operation Jacana; Uzbin Valley ambush (after action only); Operation Pickaxe-Handle; Release of hostage Christina Meier; April 2012 Afghanistan attacks Hostage incident at Qargha Reservoir / Lake Qara june 2012; Operation Ocean Shield; Operation Atalanta; Destruction of Syria's chemical weapons May 2020 Afghanistan attacks: Only a small selection of engagements / missions *
- Decorations: Army Presidential Unit Citation

Commanders
- Current commander: Colonel Brage Andreas Larssen

Insignia
- Headdress: Maroon beret

The Norwegian Special Operations Commando (NORSOC) (Norwegian: Forsvarets spesialkommando (FSK)) is a special operations force unit in the Norwegian Armed Forces. The unit was established in 1982 due to the increased risk of terrorist activity against Norwegian interests, including the oil platforms in the North Sea.

On 1 January 2014, the Norwegian Armed Forces Special Operations Command (NORSOCOM), was established uniting the NORSOC and the Norwegian Naval Special Operations Commando (Norwegian: Marinejegerkommandoen) (MJK) under the command in the Norwegian Armed Forces.

== Organisation ==
NORSOC is organized with combat squadrons composed of professional special operators. The unit also includes conscript elements, such as the all-female Jegertroppen (Ranger Platoon) and a parachute reconnaissance platoon. Conscripts who complete their service may be transferred to NORSOC's reserve or apply for further selection and training within the special forces or other parts of the Norwegian Armed Forces.

== History ==
Forsvarets spesialkommando can trace its roots back to the Second World War, when Norwegians served in the Norwegian Independent Company 1 (NOR.I.C.1) of the British Special Operations Executive, including the Operation Gunnerside raid on the heavy water plant at Rjukan.

On 25 March 1962, the Army Parachute Ranger School (Norwegian: Hærens Fallskjermjegerskole) was established. Initially, the school provided parachute training for selected groups within the Norwegian Armed Forces, and in 1965 the Paratrooper Platoon (Norwegian: Fallskjermjegertroppen) was formed. Selected personnel from this unit were assigned to Ranger Command 1 in the Cold War mobilization army and held in readiness in the event of conflict.

In 1972, the school was renamed the Army Ranger School (Norwegian: Hærens Jegerskole, HJS) to emphasize the training of Army Rangers. Over the next decade, its focus was long-range reconnaissance patrols (LRRP). With the rise of international terrorism and Norway's expanding offshore oil industry, the government decided in 1979 to establish a counter-terrorism capability within the Armed Forces. In 1982, this task was formally assigned to the Army Ranger School, and Forsvarets spesialkommando (FSK) was created as part of the school. On 1 June 1984, the 38-man unit was declared operational with support from the British Special Air Service and Special Boat Service.

=== Reveal ===
For a long period, very little was publicly known about NORSOC, as the Norwegian government denied its existence and involvement in operations. Some information emerged following the unit's participation in Operation Enduring Freedom in Afghanistan.

The establishment of NORSOC was first briefly mentioned by Aftenposten in 1983. During a hijacking in 1985, it was reported that NORSOC personnel were on alert at their base at Trandum, though they were not called upon to act. In 1988, a proposal to disband the unit for financial reasons met opposition, particularly from the oil industry and the military, and was eventually withdrawn after media coverage. At that time, Aftenposten described the unit as a "special military command composed of highly trained operators from Hærens Jegerkommando at Trandum and Marinejegerkommandoen, as well as other specialists."

The first official acknowledgement of NORSOC by the Norwegian Armed Forces came in connection with the SAS Flight 347 hijacking at Gardermoen Airport in September 1993. The following year, Vi Menn published an article on the unit. A 1990 research paper had also noted that "The Armed Forces' Special Command (NORSOC) is specially trained to be used in the event of terrorist attacks against oil installations – especially hijacking situations." NORSOC's existence was formally recognized by the Armed Forces in 1999, when an article about the unit was published in Forsvarets Forum.

NORSOC has also cooperated with several international special operations forces, including the British Special Air Service (SAS) and Special Boat Service (SBS), and U.S. Delta Force and Navy SEALs/DEVGRU.

=== Later development ===
From the mid-1990s there was an increasing focus on international operations. To signal that the Army Ranger School had developed an operational arm as well as a training role, it was renamed the Army Ranger Command (Norwegian: Hærens Jegerkommando) in 1997. The same year, the unit relocated from Trandum to Rena, where it remains based.

During the 2000s, the designation FSK/HJK was adopted to reflect the dual structure of the command (FSK as the operational unit and HJK as the training wing). In 2004, the command began reporting directly to the Chief of the Army. In 2013, the name FSK/HJK was discontinued, and the operational unit has since been known simply as FSK.

== International operations ==
=== Kosovo ===
NORSOC and the Kosovo Liberation Army (KLA) cooperated in various ways during the Kosovo conflict. NORSOC, operating alongside the British SAS, was the first special operations force to enter Pristina. NORSOC's mission was to level the negotiating field between the belligerent parties, and to fine-tune the details that the local deal required to implement the peace deal between the Serbians and the Kosovo Albanians.

=== Afghanistan ===
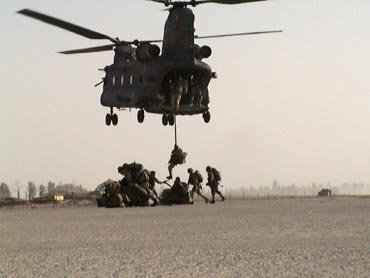
NORSOC soldiers during Operation Anaconda

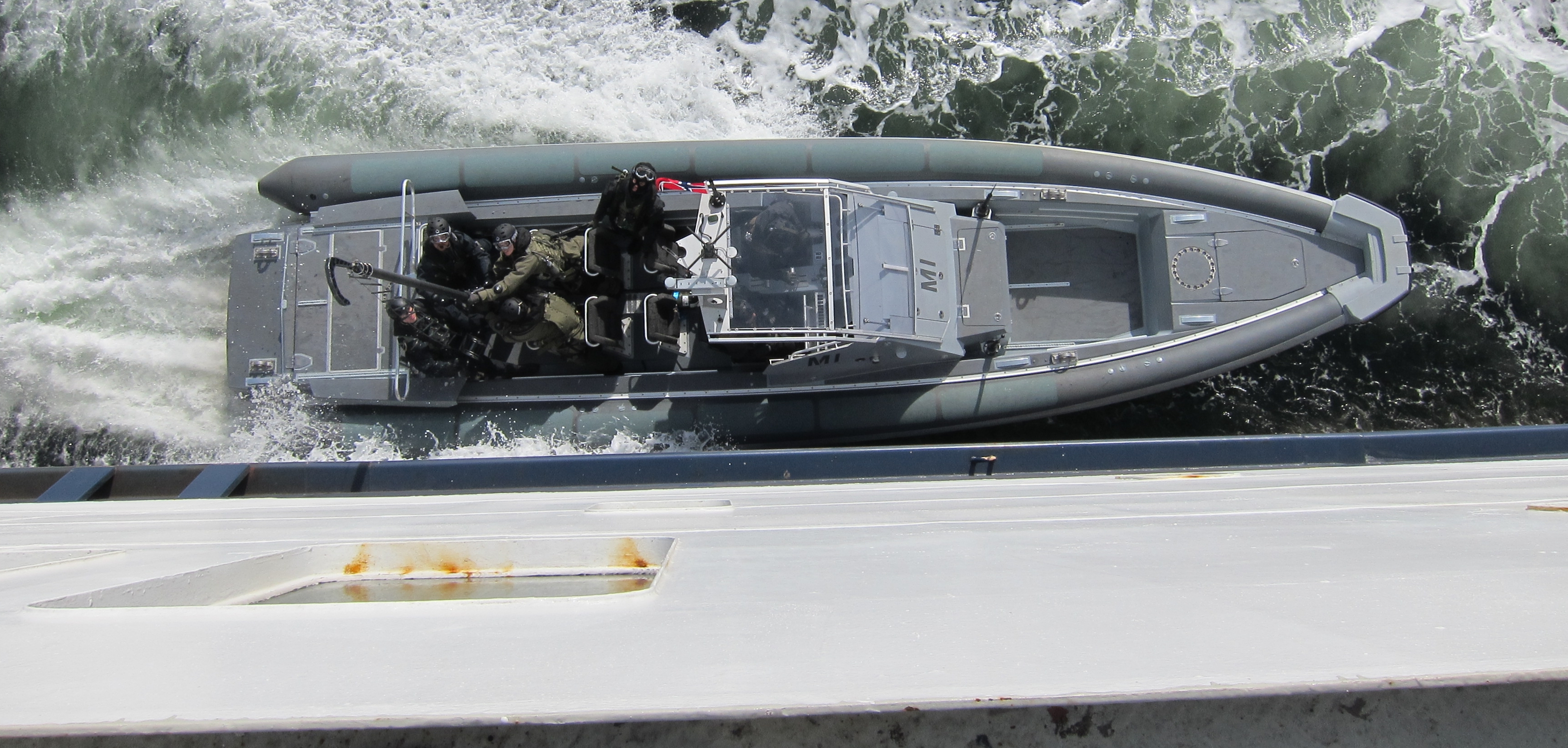
NORSOC during training in the Oslofjord, entering a ferry by telescopic ladder

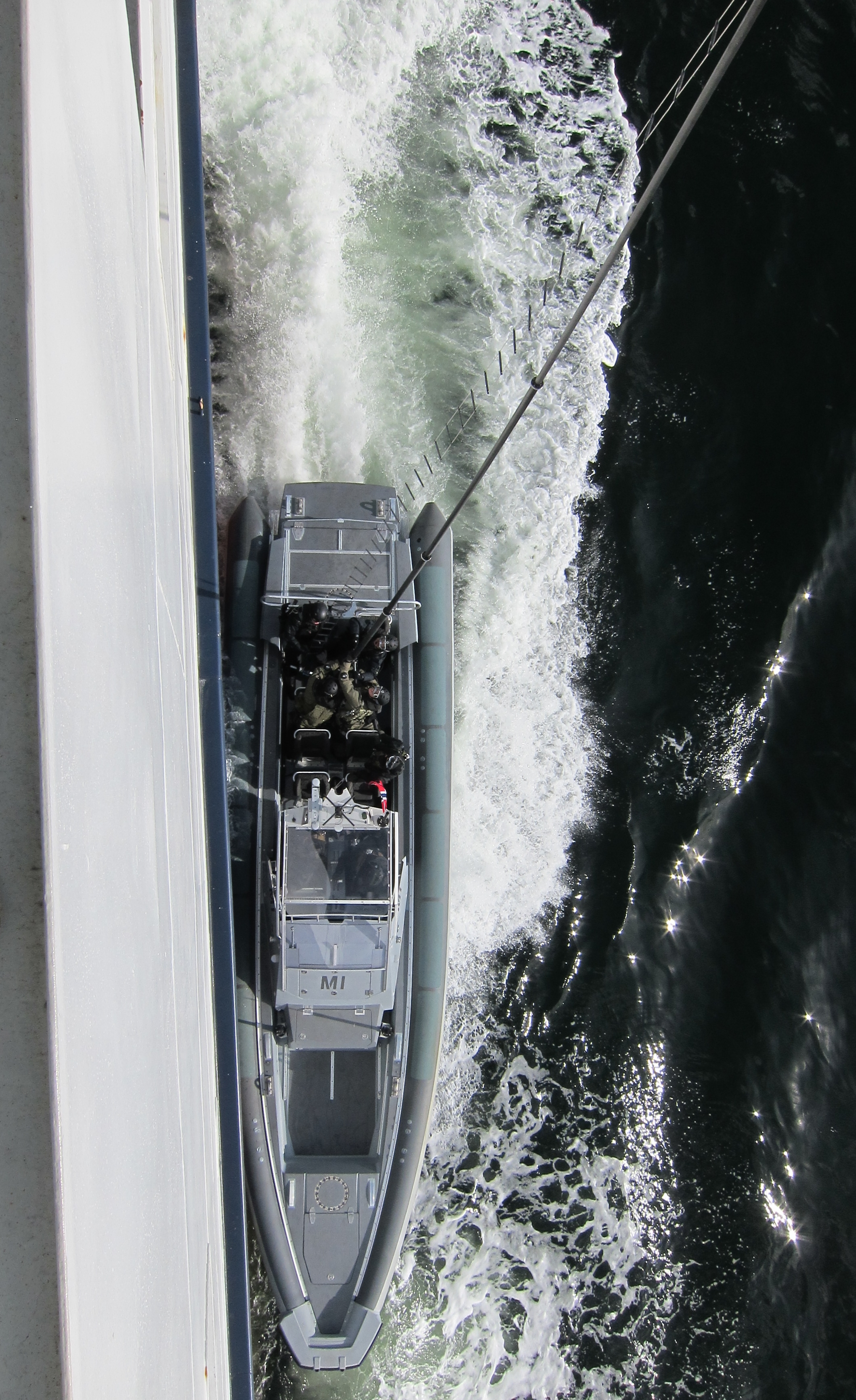
NORSOC during training in the Oslofjord, entering a ferry by telescopic ladder

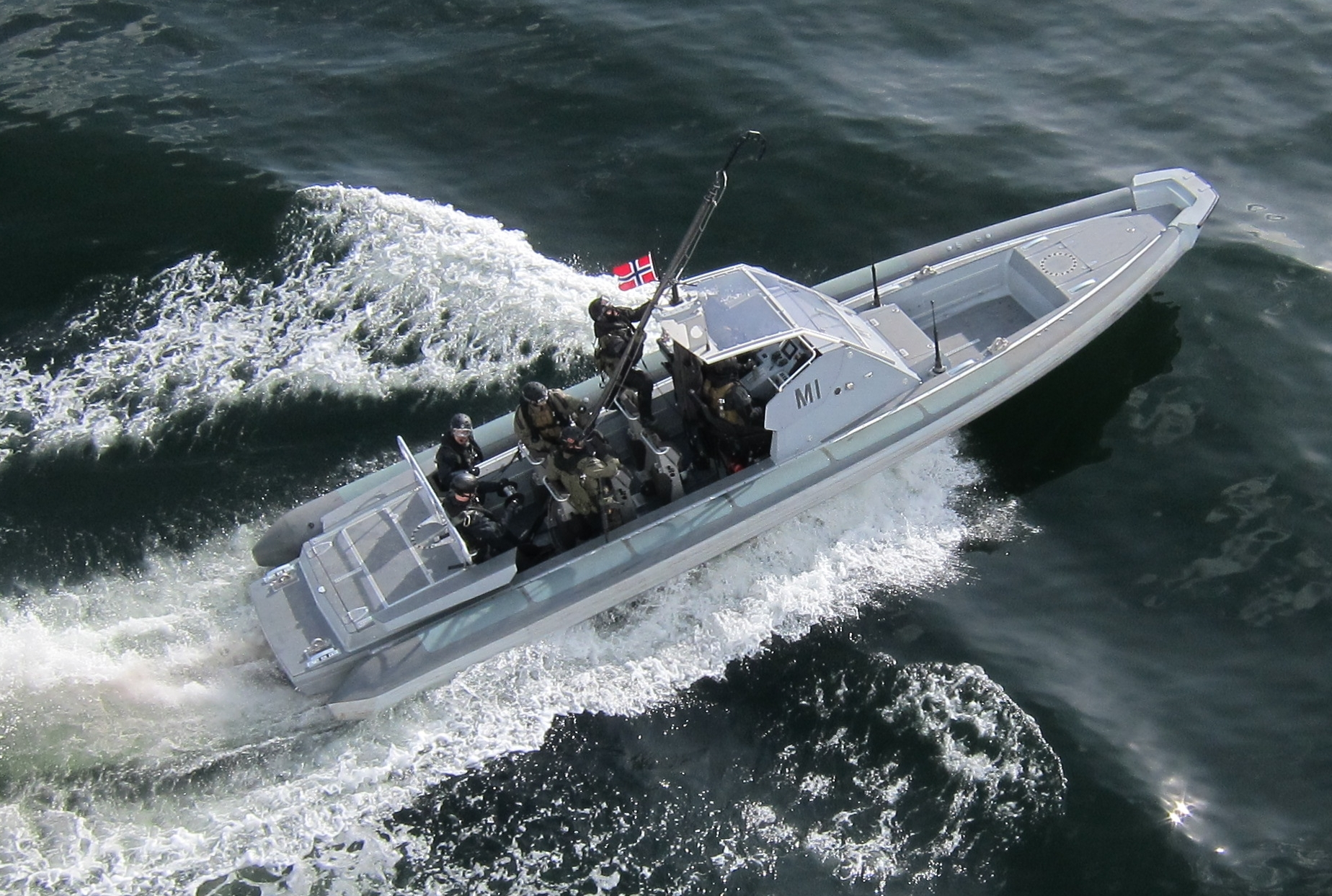
NORSOC during training in the Oslofjord

NORSOC supported Coalition Special Operations Forces in Operation Enduring Freedom in Afghanistan as part of Task Force K-Bar. They have carried out missions in the Helmand and Uruzgan provinces of South Afghanistan.

In August 2007, NORSOC members carried out the successful hostage rescue of Christina Meier, a pregnant German NGO worker in Kabul, no shots were fired and the hostage takers were believed to be a criminal gang and not insurgents.

NORSOC was responsible in training the Afghan National Police Crisis Response Unit (CRU 222) in Kabul, under the command of the International Security Assistance Force (known as the Kabul Crisis Response unit-an Afghan counterterrorist SWAT team). During the April 2012 Afghanistan attacks, NORSOC were involved in combating Taliban insurgents in Kabul, having only recently relieved a New Zealand SAS element that had been mentoring the Kabul Crisis Response unit.

NORSOC and the Naval Special Operations Commando alternated on the training of CRU from 2016 until June 2021, when the mission was terminated after the Fall of Kabul.

== The Norwegian Special Operations Commando's role ==
"The Norwegian Special Operations Commando (NORSOC) has a role in the Norwegian Armed Forces' independent responsibility to handle an act of terrorism that is considered to be an "armed attack" on Norway, but also has a dedicated mission to support the police in the event counter-terrorism operations at sea. NORSOC may further assist the police on land." – Norwegian Parliamentary Statement 29 and e-mail address.

In wartime, their tasks are mainly:

- to gather intelligence
- to localize and identify enemy supplies and activity
- to carry out offensive operations against strategically important targets
- to provide support for rescue missions of important personnel
- to provide protection for personnel and departments

=== Domestic security ===
From August 2013 NORSOC shares the national counter-terrorism standby mission together with the Norwegian Naval Special Operations Commando, Norway's other military special force.

== Selection and training ==
Currently, anyone who has completed their military service with the Norwegian Armed Forces can apply.

The road to becoming an elite soldier of the NORSOC is long and hard. First, one must go through a general selection to separate out those who do not have the physical and mental strength to start the special forces recruitment school. This selection lasts three days. A candidate must do 45 push-ups and 50 sit-ups in two minutes, 8 pull-ups, swim 400 meters in under 11 minutes and march 30 kilometers carrying 25 kilograms in less than 4 hours and 50 minutes. It is emphasized that this is the bare minimum, and that candidates should ideally be able to do more than that.

After passing the general selections, an applicant attends the SOF selection. This selection lasts three weeks and comprises hard physical and mental exercises with little food and little sleep. Very few of those who enter the school get through.

Following selection, the potential operator starts basic training (one year). This training involves all basic disciplines required to serve as a SOF operator. Not all who begin basic training get through. After training, one is eligible for operational service in NORSOC, including training in specialist roles, such as sniper, combat medic, forward air controller, etc. Further training is conducted in Norway or abroad at allied training facilities.

== Commanding officers ==
Commanding officers of NORSOC include:

- General Harald Sunde (1992–1996)
- Lieutenant colonel Karl Egil Hanevik (2003)
- Eirik Kristoffersen (2010–2014)
- Frode Arnfinn Kristoffersen (2014–2017)
- Brage Andreas Larssen (2017–)

== Weapons ==
The soldiers are or have been trained in the use of these weapons:

- Assault rifles
  - Colt Canada C8SFW and C8CQB (default rifle)
  - Heckler & Koch HK416
- Submachine guns
  - Heckler & Koch MP5
  - Heckler & Koch MP7
- Sniper rifles
  - Heckler & Koch MSG-90
  - Heckler & Koch HK417
  - Accuracy International L115A1
  - Barrett MRAD
  - M82 Barrett rifle
- Pistols
  - Heckler & Koch USP
  - Glock 17 (known as P-80)
- Grenade launchers
  - AG-C/EGLM (Fitted to C8SFW)
  - M320 Grenade Launcher Module (Fitted to HK416).
  - HK GMG (automatic grenade launcher fitted to Mercedes-Benz SF vehicles).
- Machine guns
  - FN Minimi (5.56 mm)
  - FN Mag (7.62 mm)
  - Rheinmetall MG3 (7.62 mm)
  - Browning M2 (12.7 mm)
- Shotguns
  - Remington 870
  - Benelli M4
- Anti-tank weapons
  - M72 LAW – Light anti-armor weapon
  - 84mm Rekylfri Kanon (Carl Gustav M2) – anti-tank weapon

== Vehicles ==
- Geländewagen/MB270 CDI FAV vehicle armoured and EOD protected with 3 weapon-stations (2 MG3 and 1 M2 or GMG). Developed in 2002 and was later modernized. They were used in operation Anaconda due to large amount of space and mounts for equipment and communication. In 2015, a £23 million order was placed for Supacat HMT Extenda vehicles to be delivered from 2017 to 2019.
- Safeguard ship for special forces – August Nærø . Dockstavarvet AB type IC20M Interceptor

== See also ==
- Special Air Service
- Delta Force
- SEAL Team Six
- Army Ranger Wing
- Jægerkorpset
- Särskilda operationsgruppen
