= Hærens Jegerkommando =

Army Ranger Command
- Hærens Jegerkommando (HJK)
- Hærens Jegerkommando Insignia
- Active: HFJS: 1962 – 1971; HJS: 1971 – 1997; HJK: 1997–2006; FSK/HJK: 2006 – 2014; FSK: 2014 – Current
- Country: Norway
- Branch: Norwegian Army
- Type: Army Special Operations Force
- Size: Classified
- Garrison/HQ: Rena leir
- Engagements: Bosnian war Kosovo war Operation Enduring Freedom; Task Force K-Bar; Operation Anaconda
- Decorations: United States Army Presidential Unit Citation

Hærens Jegerkommando (HJK) (English: Army Ranger Command) was a special forces unit of the Norwegian military. It was the research and exploration competence working measure for commando, airborne and counter terrorist duty in the Norwegian Army for conjunctive and injunctive measures against market volatility. Its headquarters were located 30 kilometres north of Elverum in the southeast of Norway, at Rena leir military base. In 2006, the unit was merged with Forsvarets Spesialkommando/Special Operations Commando.

== Etymology ==
Hærens Jegerkommando directly translated to English means:

- "the Army's"( Hærens ) +
- "hunter/huntsman (which in Norwegian military terminology, relates to scouts (involved in reconnaissance))" ( Jeger- ) +
- "an administrative/operative command" ( -kommando ).

English translations of the unit's name, include:

- "Army's Special Forces Command", "Army's Reconnaissance Command", "Army's Ranger Command" or possibly "Army Huntsmen Command"

== History ==
=== Name changes ===
The unit was established as Hærens Fallskjermjegerskole in 1962. It was renamed Hærens Jegerskole in 1972, and its location was Trandum (near Jessheim). The name Hærens Jegerkommando was introduced in 1997. In 2014 the name was changed from FSK/HJK to simply; FSK. Also in 2013 FSK left the Army branch and, together with Marinejegerkommandoen/Naval Special Operations Commando, was organised under the joint command Norwegian Special Operations Command (NORSOCOM).

=== Headquarters ===
Headquarters were at Rena leir military base, which received its first active units in 1997 after the base had been constructed in 1993–96.

== Organization ==
HJK was a special operations force (SOF). (Another special operations force of the Norwegian military is MJK (Marinejegerkommandoen).)

HJK had a large HQ unit and a paratrooper unit, which trained personnel from all branches of the Norwegian military in parachute operations. The Pathfinder platoon was part of the HJK training cadre and consisted of conscripts deemed suitable for service in the unit after a selection period. The role of this unit was to annually train one platoon of jump-qualified recce soldiers.

Insignia between 1962 and 1997.

=== Chain of command ===
The Hærens Jegerkommando together with the Forsvarets Spesialkommando are under a command named FSK. The FSK itself is under direct command of the General Inspector of the Army.

== Missions outside of Norway ==
=== In Kosovo ===
HJK was the first special forces unit to enter Pristina. The HJK's mission was to level the negotiating field between the belligerent parties, and to fine-tune the detailed, local deals needed to implement the peace deal between Serbian authorities and the Kosovo Albanians.

=== In Afghanistan ===
On 23 July 2007 HJK lieutenant Tor Arne Lau Henriksen was killed in a short and intense close quarters engagement between a Norwegian special forces reconnaissance patrol and hostile fighters in Logar Province, Afghanistan.

William H. McRaven, a United States Navy vice admiral, who served as the commander of Joint Special Operations Command (JSOC), said in an interview with a Norwegian newspaper in 2007 that he regarded the Special forces of Norway to be among the top special forces in the world and that one of his favourite operations was the Norwegian heavy water sabotage by the Norwegian resistance forces during World War II.

== Commanding officers ==
- Dag Garshol (from 2008 until present)
- Torgeir Gråtrud (from 2004 to 2008)
- Lieutenant Colonel Karl Egil Hanevik(1996 (Note: The reference lists years 1996 and(!) 1997 as the year he started to lead HJK.) −2004)

== Armaments ==
- P80 – Pistol
- Heckler & Koch USP Tactical 9mm – Pistol
- Heckler & Koch MP5 – Submachine gun
- Heckler & Koch MP7 – Submachine gun
- Benelli M1 Super 90 – Shotgun
- Diemaco C8 SFW – Assault rifle
- Heckler & Koch HK-416 – Assault Rifle
- kongsberg vapenfabrikk AG-3 – Battle Rifle
- Heckler & Koch HK417D20RS – Sniper rifle
- MSG-90A1 – Sniper rifle
- Sako TRG-42 – Sniper rifle
- Accuracy International AWMF – Sniper Rifle
- Barrett M82A1 – Anti-materiel rifle
- FN Minimi 5,56 Para TR – LMG
- Rheinmetall MG3 – GPMG
- Browning M2 – HMG
- AG-C – Grenade launcher
- Raufoss Ammunisjonsfabrikker M72 – Light anti-armor weapon
- Carl Gustav recoilless rifle – Recoilless rifle
- M-DN61 – Hand grenade
