= Marinejegerkommandoen =

Norwegian naval special operations unit

Naval Special Operations Commando
- Marinejegerkommandoen (MJK)
- Active: Frogmen: 1953–1968 MJK: 1968–current
- Country: Norway
- Branch: Norwegian Special Operations Command
- Type: Naval Special Operation Forces
- Size: Classified
- Garrison/HQ: Haakonsvern Naval Base and Ramsund Naval Base
- Mottos: "Prepare for tomorrow's threats, today"
- Colors: Green beret flash on blue navy beret
- Engagements: Operation Enduring Freedom (Task Force K-Bar); Operation Anaconda; Operation Jacana; International Security Assistance Force; Operation Pickaxe-Handle; Operation Atalanta; Operation Ocean Shield; Resolute Support Mission; American University of Afghanistan attack Hostage situation at Hetal Hotel, Kabul May 2015; 2018 Inter-Continental Hotel Kabul attack 2015 Park Palace guesthouse attack
- Decorations: United States Navy Presidential Unit Citation

Commanders
- Current commander: Commander Kåre Karlsen (Commander MJK) Major general Torgeir Gråtrud. (Commander NORSOCOM)

Marinejegerkommandoen (MJK) (English: Naval Special Operations Commando) is the maritime/naval special warfare unit of the Norwegian Armed Forces and was established in 1953.

The MJK is under the command of the Norwegian Special Operations Command (NORSOCOM) together with the Special Operations Commando with the MJK being the older of the two units. The unit is headquartered on the Ramsund naval base in northern Norway, with other MJK operators stationed on the Haakonsvern naval base in western Norway.

== Selection ==
As with any modern special operations forces, the training to become an MJK operator is long and arduous, both physically and mentally taxing. To become a fully qualified MJK operator takes a minimum of two years and is further augmented by specialized courses during the following contract period, such as combat medic training, sniper training and forward air control (FAC) training.

In 2008 a news-team from NRK filmed their selection process, showing recruits being strip searched and doing water exercises in a secret abandoned naval base somewhere along the Norwegian coast.

== History ==
In the autumn of 1940, two Norwegian military units were set up in the United Kingdom. Their mission was to carry out special operations against Nazi forces in occupied Norway. The two units were Shetlandsgjengen (Shetland Bus), who used fishing vessels to transport people and materials to and from Norway, and Kompani Linge (Norwegian Independent Company 1), initially under the command of Lieutenant Martin Linge. Both units were under the command of the British Special Operations Executive.

In 1953, the Royal Norwegian Navy formed a frogman-unit. This unit was under the command of Ove Lund, and is the origin of the modern Marinejegerkommandoen and Minedykkerkommandoen. The mission of the frogmen was to conduct recon and sabotage against enemy targets above and below water. The frogmen were also tasked with disarming all water-borne explosive devices.

The missions gradually become more comprehensive and different frogman specialities emerged. This led to members of the unit being divided into a clearance diver team and two combat swimmer teams, in 1968. Of the combat swimmer groups, one was based at Ramsund Naval Station in northern Norway, and one was based at Karljohansvern Naval Station in southern Norway.

The two combat swimmer teams were eventually fused into one and based in Ramsund. They later changed names to the current Marinejegerkommandoen. Today the unit has its main base in Bergen, with training facilities in Ramsund.

== Role ==
Marinejegerkommandoen plays an integral part in modern warfare operations. The unit carries out missions that require thorough planning, quick reaction, high precision, covert implementation, daring, courage and the ability to work independently. As with all SOF missions, they target objectives of high or critical strategic value.

=== Domestic security ===
Marinejegerkommandoen is on national counter-terrorism standby to assist the Norwegian Police if required (alongside Forsvarets Spesialkommando), and is also on continuous standby for international operations.

=== International operations ===
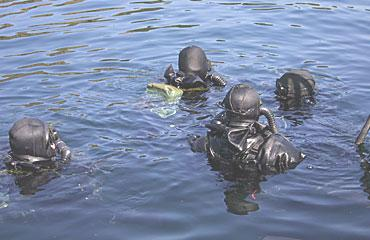
Four Marinejegerkommandoen divers in the water

The Marinejegerkommandoen have participated in a number of international operations. The unit conducted operations in Afghanistan in 2002 (Task Force K-Bar), in 2003 and in 2005–2006, as part of Operation Enduring Freedom. The unit was also involved in the training of the Afghan National Police Crisis Response Unit around Kabul in 2008–2009, relieving Forsvarets Spesialkommando for a short period.

The unit provided operators for Military Observer Teams (MOT's), as part of the Norwegian Armed Forces contribution in Faryab Province in northern Afghanistan. It was during a MOT patrol on 27 June 2010 that Lieutenant Commander Trond Andrè Bolle was killed, along with three members of the Norwegian Coastal Ranger Command, when the Iveco LMV they were travelling in was struck by an IED. Lt Cmdr Bolle was later awarded the Norwegian War Cross with Sword for his actions commanding the Norwegian Special Operations Force Task Group II in support of Operation Enduring Freedom in Afghanistan's Helmand province from October 2005 to February 2006.

MJK's contribution in Afghanistan has largely been kept secret, but from what little information is available, its missions have included DA (direct action), Forward Air Control (FAC) and SR (Special Surveillance and Reconnaissance), and cooperating with other coalition forces in the fight against the Taliban and Al-Qaeda.

Following Afghanistan, MJK has deployed twice aboard Royal Norwegian Navy frigate HNoMS Fridtjof Nansen (F310) off the coast of Somalia, conducting anti-piracy operations as part of Operation Atalanta (2009) and Operation Ocean Shield (2013).

In January 2013, medical specialists from MJK, amongst other units, were sent on a Norwegian Air Force Super Hercules to Sicily in connection with the In Amenas hostage crisis in Algeria.

=== Recognition ===
Marinejegerkommandoen's participation in Operation Enduring Freedom earned the unit the Navy Presidential Unit Citation on 8 February 2005. The Presidential Unit Citation is the highest unit award given by the United States to allied units and was awarded to all members of Task Force K-Bar. William H. McRaven, a United States Navy Admiral who previously served as the commander of Joint Special Operations Command (JSOC), said in an interview with a Norwegian newspaper in 2007 that he regarded the Special Operations Forces of Norway to be among the top special operations forces in the world.

A member of the MJK was in August 2020 awarded the Bronze Star Medal of the United States for extraordinary allied efforts during a mission in Afghanistan.

== Structure ==
Naval Special Operations Commando (Norwegian: Marinejegerkommandoen) (MJK), at Jaeger's Bight in Haakonsvern Naval Base, near Bergen. A research paper of the Norwegian Defence Research Establishment puts the force structure of the MJK at a staff and six combat squadrons:

- HQ Staff (MJK stab)
- Alfa Squadron - premier naval special warfare unit
- Bravo Squadron - entry unit for recent graduates of the training course
- Echo Squadron - special boat squadron
- Reconnaissance Squadron - special reconnaissance and intelligence unit
- Lima Squadron - combat service support squadron
- Training Squadron, at Ramsund Naval War Station (Ramsund orlogsstasjon) in Tjeldsund Municipality

== Commanding officers ==
- Tom Robertsen (-2014)
- Petter Hellesen (2014-2018)
- Trond Gimmingsrud (2018-2020)
- Kåre Karlsen (2020-)

== Vessels ==
- 10 Goldfish 36 RIB (special version of the 36 model) by Goldfish Boats AS
- Safeguard ship for special forces - Petter B Salen. Dockstavarvet AB type IC20M Interceptor

== See also ==
- Forsvarets Spesialkommando (FSK)
- Minedykkerkommandoen (Royal Norwegian Navy clearance divers/EOD)
- Kystjegerkommandoen (Royal Norwegian Navy Coastal Ranger Command)
- Norwegian Tactical Boat Squadron (in Norwegian)
- Delta (Norwegian Police tactical unit)
- List of military special forces units
