= Joint Task Force 435 =

Task force of the United States in Afghanistan

Combined Joint Interagency Task Force 435
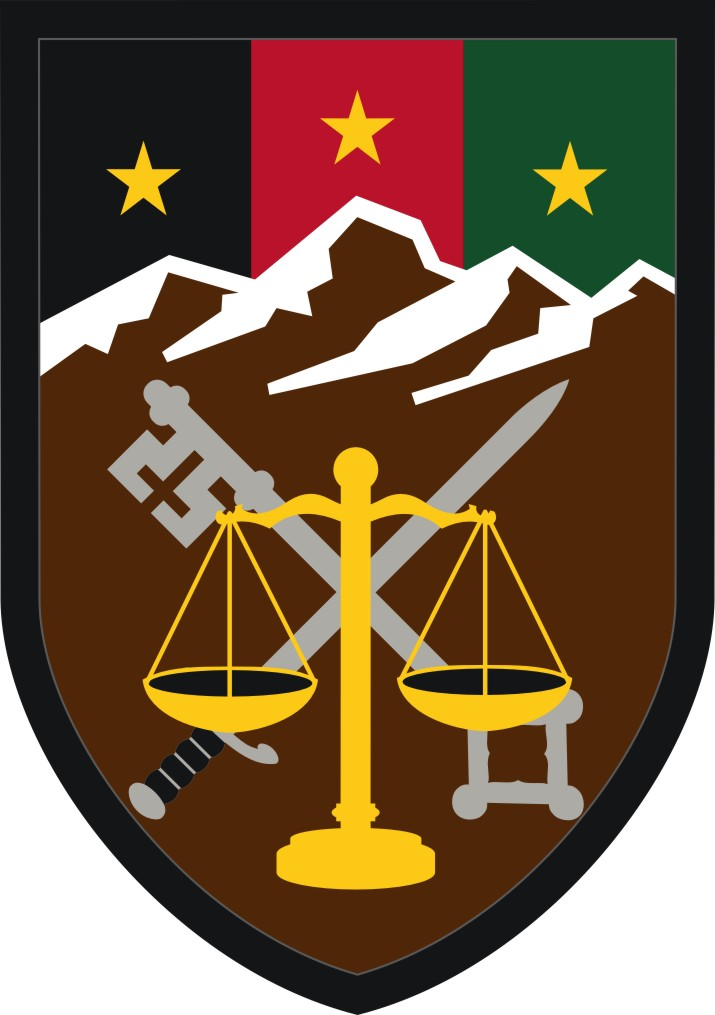
- Active: 2009-2014
- Disbanded: October 2014
- Country: United States
- Branch: United States Army; United States Navy; United States Marine Corps; United States Air Force
- Type: Task Force
- Part of: U.S. Central Command
- Garrison/HQ: Kabul, Afghanistan

Commanders
- (2009–2011): VADM Robert Harward
- (2011–2013): LTG Keith M. Huber, USA
- (July–October 2013): BG Balan Ayyar, USAF
- (October 2013 – July 2014): BG General Mark Inch, USA
- (July 2014- October 2014): BG Patrick Reinert, USA

Insignia
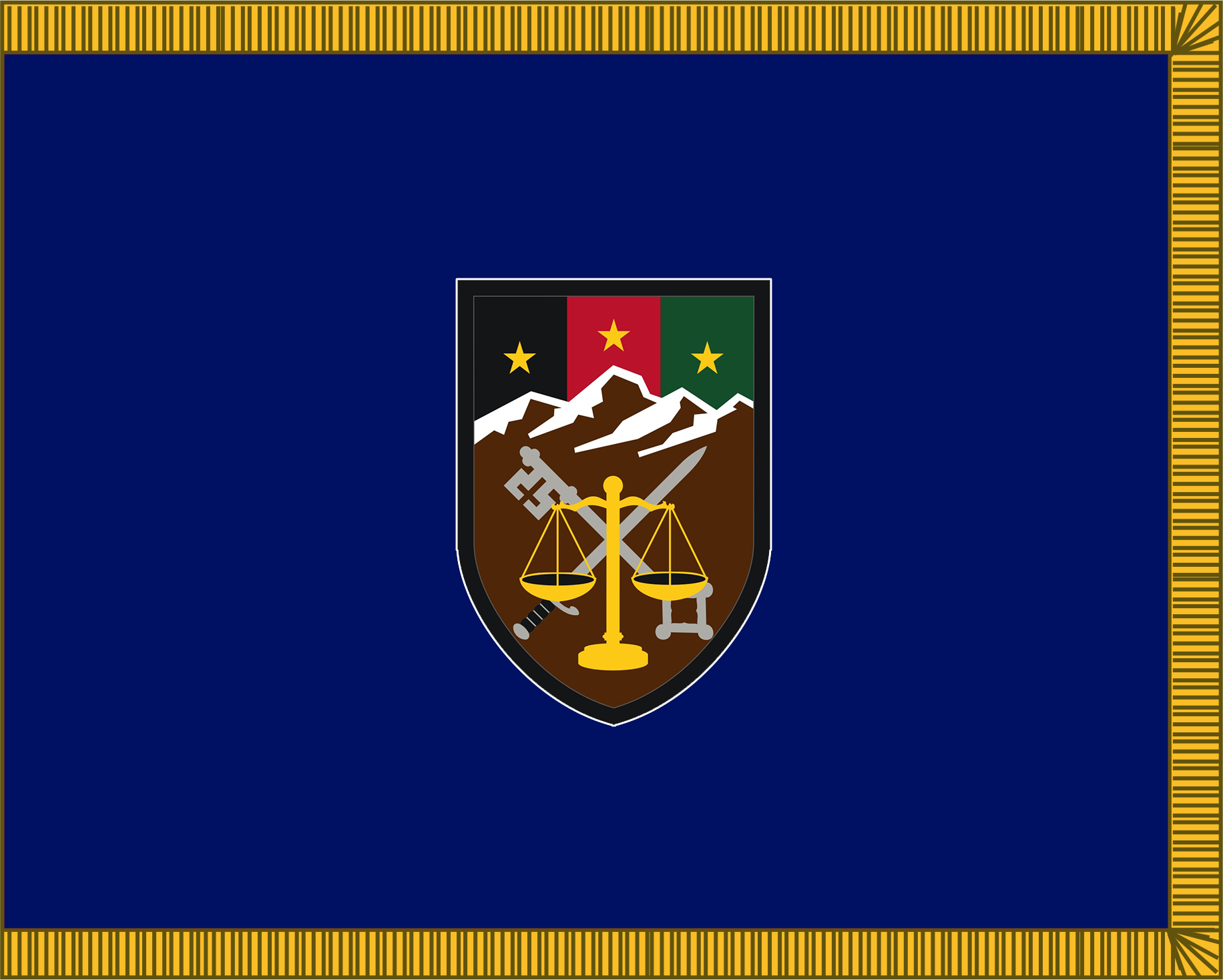
- Joint Interagency Task Force 435 Flag

Combined Joint Interagency Task Force 435 (CJIATF 435) was a subordinate command of U.S. Forces-Afghanistan (USFOR-A) active from 2009 to 2014. It included members from the U.S. Army, U.S. Navy, U.S. Marine Corps and U.S. Air Force, plus United States Department of Defense civilians, contractors and coalition members. CJIATF 435 partnered with the Afghan National Security Forces, the Afghan National Army Detention Operations Command, the U.S. Department of State's Division of International Narcotics and Law Enforcement, the U.S. Department of Justice (including the Federal Bureau of Investigation), the International Security Assistance Force Joint Command and the Combined Security Transition Command-Afghanistan.

== Activities ==
The task force's mission was to "train, advise and assist the Afghan National Army and Afghan Justice Sector to develop Rule of Law-based investigation, prosecution and detention of insurgent and terror-related threats while conducting U.S. Law of Armed Conflict detainee operations for third country nationals to protect U.S. forces and strengthen the legitimacy of the Government of the Islamic Republic of Afghanistan."

In cooperation with the coalition and international counterparts, CJIATF 435 supported the Government of the Islamic Republic of Afghanistan in building self-sustaining detention capacity and rule of law institutions compliant with Afghan and international law. CJIATF 435 members served as advisors supporting Afghan detention operations, and were committed to the secure custody and humane care of detainees. All U.S. facilities operated in compliance with the applicable sections of Common Article III of the Geneva Conventions, the U.S. Detainee Treatment Act of 2005, relevant U.S. Executive Orders, Department of Defense policy and the U.S. Army Field Manual on interrogations.

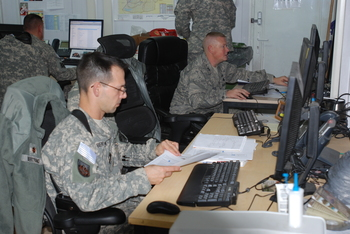
Joint Task Force 435 officers gather information at Bagram Airfield.

CJIATF 435 also coordinated with the International Committee of the Red Cross and human rights organizations to ensure compliance with international standards of humane care and detainee treatment.

== History ==
Joint Task Force 435 (JTF 435) was established by the Secretary of Defense on Sept. 18, 2009, and directed to assume command, control, oversight and responsibility for all U.S. detainee operations in Afghanistan. JTF 435 assumed responsibility for U.S. detainee operations from Combined Joint Task Force 82, including the care and custody of detainees at the Detention Facility in Parwan, oversight of detainee review processes, programs for the peaceful reintegration of detainees into society, and coordination with other agencies and partners for the promotion of the rule of law and biometrics in Afghanistan. JTF 435 achieved initial operations capability on Jan. 7, 2010.

With the addition of combined and interagency partners, JTF 435 officially became CJIATF 435 on Sept. 1, 2010. Along with the name change, the command assumed new missions and responsibilities in support of rule of law efforts as it partnered with the office of the U.S. Ambassador to Afghanistan for Rule of Law and Law Enforcement. Additionally, the task force created the Rule of Law Field Force-Afghanistan to execute projects and programs to increase rule of law capacity in Afghanistan.

CJIATF 435 officially transferred the Detention Facility in Parwan to the control of the Afghan government on March 25, 2013, with the facility known from that date forward as the Afghan National Detention Facility in Parwan. The Afghan National Army Detention Operations Command controls the detention facility. CJIATF 435 continues to train, advise and assist the Afghan guard force at the facility.

The task force was commanded by U.S. Navy Vice Admiral Robert Harward (2009–2011), U.S. Army Lieutenant General Keith M. Huber (2011–2013); U.S. Air Force Brigadier General Balan Ayyar (July–October 2013), U.S. Army Brigadier General Mark Inch (October 2013 – July 2014), and U.S. Army Brigadier General Patrick Reinert (July 2014- October 2014). The Task Force ceased operations in October 2014.

== Sources ==
- Combined Joint Interagency Task Force 435 fact sheet, October 17, 2013
