= Paula Kantor =

American gender and economic development specialist

Paula Kantor

Paula L. Kantor (May 7, 1969 - May 13, 2015) was a gender and economic development specialist who was killed in the 2015 Park Palace guesthouse attack.

Kantor had been working for the International Maize and Wheat Improvement Center, as a Senior Scientist in Development and Gender at the time of the attack. She was leading a project to improve the livelihoods of people living in wheat-growing areas of Afghanistan, Ethiopia and Pakistan. Prior to that position she was the senior gender scientist at WorldFish from 2012 through 2015. As part of that work, she trained and assisted NGOs in delivering gender programming to women fish retailers in Egypt. Kantor was the director of the Afghanistan Research and Evaluation Unit (AREU) from 2008 through 2010.

== Early life and education ==
Kantor was born May 7, 1969, to Barbara and Anthony Kantor. She grew up in Illinois with a brother and a sister. She earned a Bachelor of Science in economics from the Wharton School in 1990, and a master's degree in Gender and Development from the Institute of Development Studies University of Sussex. Her PhD focused on international economic development and gender which she finished at the University of North Carolina at Chapel Hill in 2000. The University of Sussex has begun a named scholarship in Kantor's name.

== Published reports ==
- Rethinking Rural Poverty Reduction in Afghanistan (October 2011, with Adam Pain)
- Running Out of Options Tracing Rural Afghan Livelihoods (January 2011, with Adam Pain)
- Securing Life and Livelihoods in Rural Afghanistan, The Role of Social Relationships (December 2010, with Adam Pain)
- Understanding and Addressing Context in Rural Afghanistan, How Villages Differ and Why (December 2010, with Adam Pain)
- Afghanistan Livelihood Trajectories: Evidence from Faryab (September 2010, with Batul Nezami)
- Improving Efforts to Achieve Equitable Growth and Reduce Poverty (April 2010)
- Building a Viable Microfinance Sector in Afghanistan (January 2010, with Erna Andersen)
- From Access to Impact: Microcredit and Rural Livelihoods in Afghanistan (June 2009)
- Delivering on Poverty Reduction: Focusing ANDS Implementation on Pro-Poor Outcomes (January 2009, with Adam Pain)
