= Robert Harward =

United States Navy admiral (born 1956)

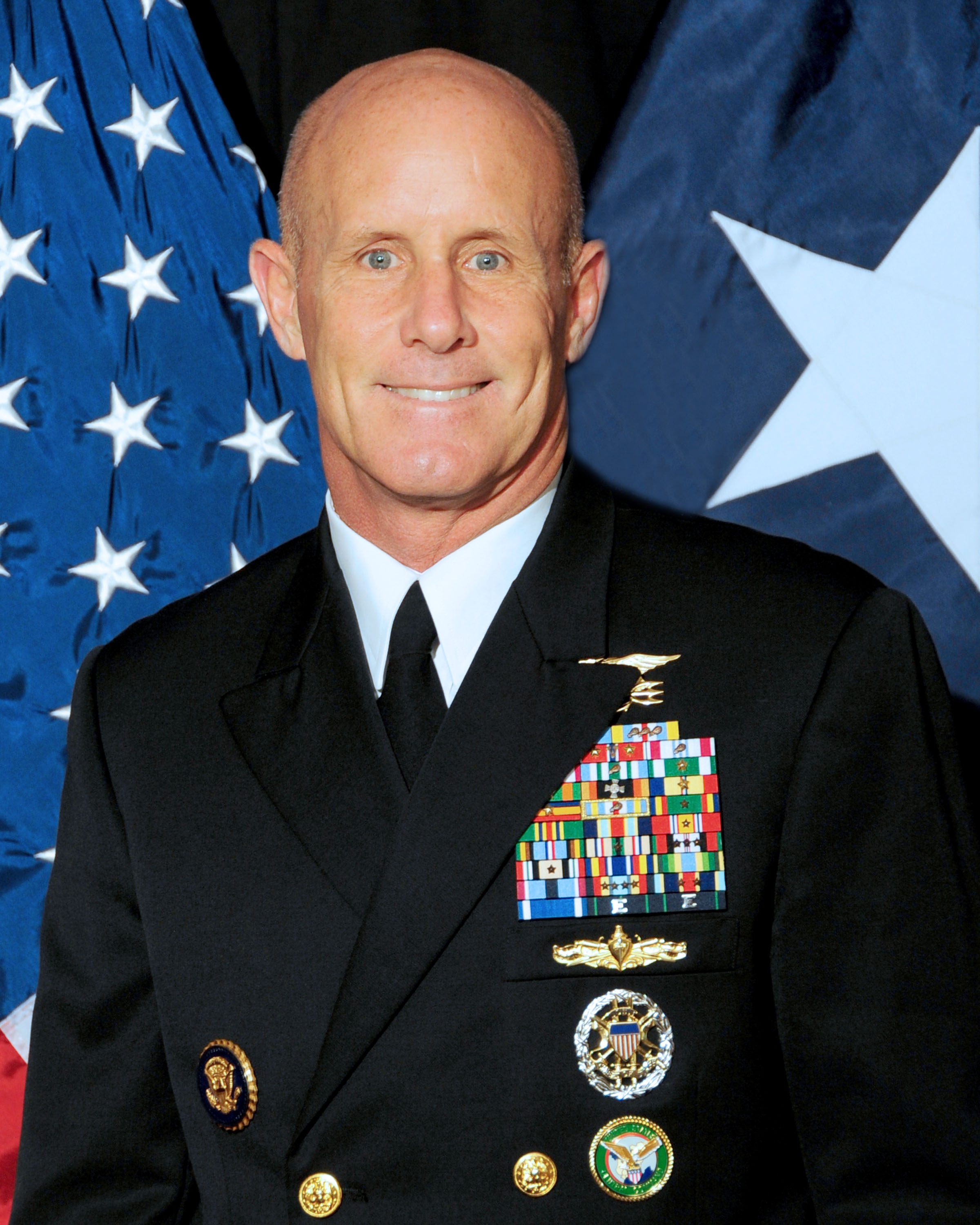
- Harward in 2011
- Born: Robert Stiles Harward Jr. 1956 (age 69–70); Newport, Rhode Island, U.S.
- Military career
- Allegiance: United States
- Branch: United States Navy
- Service years: 1975–2013
- Rank: Vice Admiral
- Nickname: Bob
- Unit: United States Navy SEALs
- Commands: Deputy Commander, USCENTCOM; SEAL Team 3 Naval Special Warfare Group 1 Task Force K-Bar; Task Force 561; NSC Director of Strategy and Defense Issues
- Conflicts: War in Afghanistan; Iraq War
- Awards: Defense Distinguished Service Medal (3); Defense Superior Service Medal (4)

Robert Stiles Harward Jr. (born 1956) is a retired United States Navy SEAL and a former Deputy Commander of the United States Central Command, under the leadership command of General James Mattis. After working as a chief executive at Lockheed Martin's Middle East business division for eight years, he joined Shield AI as executive vice president for International Business and Strategy. He served as the Deputy Commander of U.S. Joint Forces Command and commanded Combined Joint Interagency Task Force 435.

After the resignation of Michael T. Flynn, U.S. President Donald Trump offered him the position of National Security Advisor on February 14, 2017. He declined the offer on February 16. While Harward cited family commitments as his reason for refusing the role, news sources reported that Harward was unable to agree with Trump over his scope to make his own appointments to his team.

== Early life and education ==
Harward was born into a U.S. Navy family in Newport, Rhode Island. During his teenage years, Harward's father advised the pre-revolutionary Iranian military and the family lived in Tehran, Iran. While attending Tehran American School, Harward played on many teams, including basketball, wrestling, track, and Tehran American School and International School football teams. Harward was said to be popular with his classmates and became familiar with the people and culture of Iran. He graduated from the Tehran American School in Iran in 1974. Harward speaks Persian. He graduated from the Naval Academy Preparatory School in Newport, and then received his bachelor's degree from the United States Naval Academy in 1979.

Harward is also a graduate of the College of Naval Command and Staff at the Naval War College as well as the Armed Forces Staff College. He served as a federal executive fellow at RAND, and completed the Foreign Policy Program (Seminar XXI) at the Massachusetts Institute of Technology (MIT).

== Military career ==
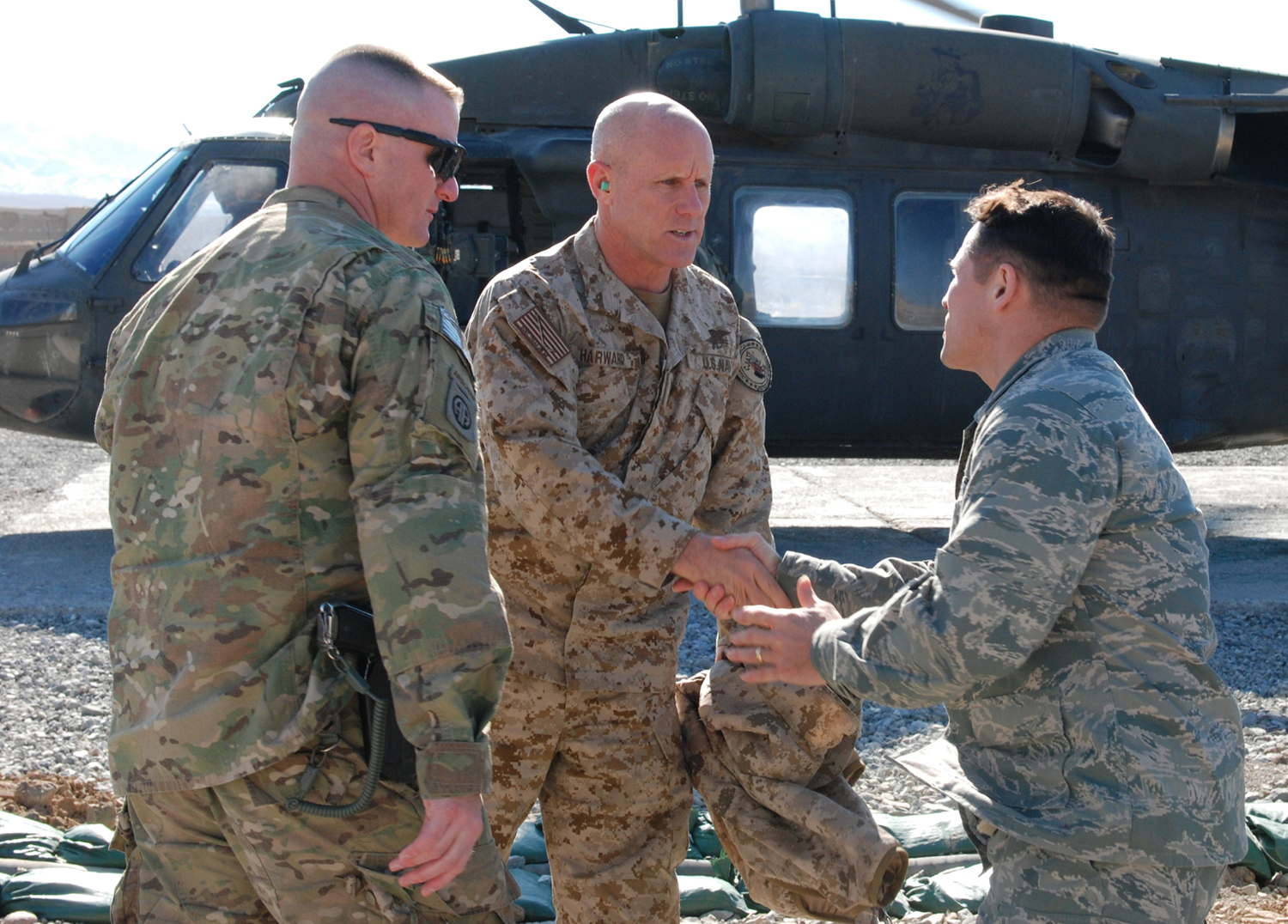
Harward in Afghanistan, 2011

Harward reported to Surface Warfare Officer School in Newport with follow-on orders to the USS Scott (DDG-995). After completing a South American deployment, he received orders to Basic Underwater Demolition/SEAL training (BUD/S) at Naval Amphibious Base Coronado where he graduated as the honor man of BUD/S class 128 in July 1984. Following SEAL Tactical Training (STT) and completion of a six-month probationary period, he received the 1130 designator as a Naval Special Warfare Officer, entitled to wear the Special Warfare insignia.

As a Navy SEAL officer, Harward served as platoon commander with SEAL Team THREE and then completed a specialized selection and training course for assignment to Naval Special Warfare Development Group in 1988. Harward served as assault team leader and operations officer and planned, rehearsed and operated during classified exercises and operations. Harward later earned a Master of Arts degree in National Security and Strategic Studies from the Naval War College. Harward served staff and command tours including Naval Special Warfare task group commander for Operation Desert Thunder in Kuwait; Joint Special Operations task force commander for Operation Rugged Nautilus; deputy commander of the Combined Joint Special Operations Task Force in support of Operation Joint Forge in Bosnia.; Special Warfare Plans officer for Commander Amphibious Forces U.S. Seventh Fleet; Aide-de-Camp to Commander-in-Chief, USSOCOM; executive officer of Naval Special Warfare Unit ONE and commanding officer of SEAL Team THREE from 1996 to 1998.

As a Navy Captain, Harward assumed command of Naval Special Warfare Group ONE (NSWG 1) in August 2001 and deployed shortly after September 11 attacks, to Afghanistan. He commanded a special multinational task force CJSOTF-South (known operationally as Task Force K-Bar) and directed special reconnaissance and direct action missions throughout the country. In October 2002, Harward deployed as Commander, Task Force 561 where he commanded Naval Special Warfare Task Group Central in Iraq. His forces included all the assets in the Naval Special Warfare inventory as well as forces from the Polish GROM, the United Kingdom Royal Marines and the Kuwaiti Navy.

Harward relinquished command of NSWG 1 in August 2003 and reported to the Executive Office of the President at the White House. He served on the National Security Council staff as the director of Strategy and Defense Issues. In April 2005, Harward was assigned to the new National Counterterrorism Center in Washington, as the chairman, Joint Chiefs of Staff representative to the Senior Interagency Strategy Team. From June 2006 to July 2008, Harward served as the Deputy Commanding General, Joint Special Operations Command, Fort Bragg, North Carolina, and he served multiple combat tours in Afghanistan and Iraq. He considered himself proud of helping to improve the situation of women on his duty.

On November 3, 2008, Harward assumed the position of Deputy Commander, United States Joint Forces Command. In 2011, Harward was reappointed to the rank of Vice Admiral and assigned to the position of Deputy Commander, United States Central Command led by General James Mattis. In October 2013, he was replaced by VADM Mark I. Fox. On August 19, 2013, Harward was presented the Distinguished Graduate Leadership Award by the U.S. Naval War College. Harward retired in November 2013 after 34 years of military service.

In January 2014, Harward became the chief executive of Lockheed Martin United Arab Emirates.

Following the resignation of Michael T. Flynn as National Security Advisor on February 13, 2017, Harward was named as a possible replacement. President Donald Trump offered Harward the position on February 14, 2017. Harward declined the position on February 16. Media reports cited sources indicating that Harward was unable to agree with Trump over making his own appointments to his team.

On September 4, 2019, Patriot One Technologies Inc., a threat detection technology company, announced that Harward had joined the company's Senior Advisory Board.

On January 26, 2022, Shield AI, an AI-focused defense technology company, announced Harward as the "Executive Vice President for International Business and Strategy."

== Awards and decorations ==
U.S. military decorations
Defense Distinguished Service Medal with two bronze oak leaf cluster
Defense Superior Service Medal with three bronze oak leaf clusters
Legion of Merit
Bronze Star with Combat "V" and three gold award stars
Defense Meritorious Service Medal with bronze oak leaf cluster
Meritorious Service Medal with gold award star
Joint Service Commendation Medal with bronze oak leaf cluster
Navy and Marine Corps Commendation Medal with gold award star
Navy and Marine Corps Achievement Medal with gold award star
Combat Action Ribbon with gold award star
Navy Presidential Unit Citation with one bronze service star
Joint Meritorious Unit Award with bronze oak leaf cluster
Navy Unit Commendation with one bronze service star
Navy Meritorious Unit Commendation
Fleet Marine Force Ribbon
National Defense Service Medal with bronze service star
Armed Forces Expeditionary Medal
Southwest Asia Service Medal with bronze service star
Afghanistan Campaign Medal with three bronze service stars
Iraq Campaign Medal with bronze service star
Global War on Terrorism Service Medal
Armed Forces Service Medal
Humanitarian Service Medal
Navy Sea Service Deployment Ribbon with four bronze service stars
Navy and Marine Corps Overseas Service Ribbon with two bronze service stars
Bundeswehr Silver Cross of Honor
NATO Medal for Former Yugoslavia
Navy Expert Rifleman Medal
Navy Expert Pistol Shot Medal

U.S. badges, patches and tabs
Naval Special Warfare insignia
Surface Warfare insignia
Navy and Marine Corps Parachutist Insignia
Joint Chiefs of Staff Identification Badge
CENTCOM Staff Identification Badge
Presidential Service Badge

== See also ==
- List of United States Navy SEALs

Military offices
Preceded by John R. Allen	Deputy Commander of the United States Central Command; 2011–2013	Succeeded by Mark I. Fox
