= Hostage incident at Lake Qargha =

Hostage incident near Kabul

- Location: Lake Qargha, Kabul, Afghanistan
- Date: 21–22 June 2012
- Attack type: terrorist attack / hostage-taking
- Weapons: Heavily armed with firearms grenades and explosives
- Deaths: 21
- Injuries: na
- Perpetrators: 7 Taliban militants
- Motive: See info in article

Armed Taliban militants performed a major attack on a popular lakefront resort on Lake Qargha near Kabul. The attack happened just before midnight. The Taliban militants shot several guards and took over 250-300 hostages and held them at gunpoint and armed with explosives. A wedding party of some 300 guests hid in the lake for several hours until the situation was dealt with by a combined force of ANA and ISAF troops as well as air support. Some 12 hours later the death toll stood at 21, including 17 civilians inside the resort hotel in addition to a policeman and several security guards. Norwegian soldiers from the Forsvarets Spesialkommando mentoring ANA was heavily involved in dealing with the situation and rescue of guests.

The Taliban claimed responsibility for the attack, claiming that they attacked the restaurant to frame foreigners and "indecent behavior" such as drinking alcohol.
