= Task Force K-Bar =

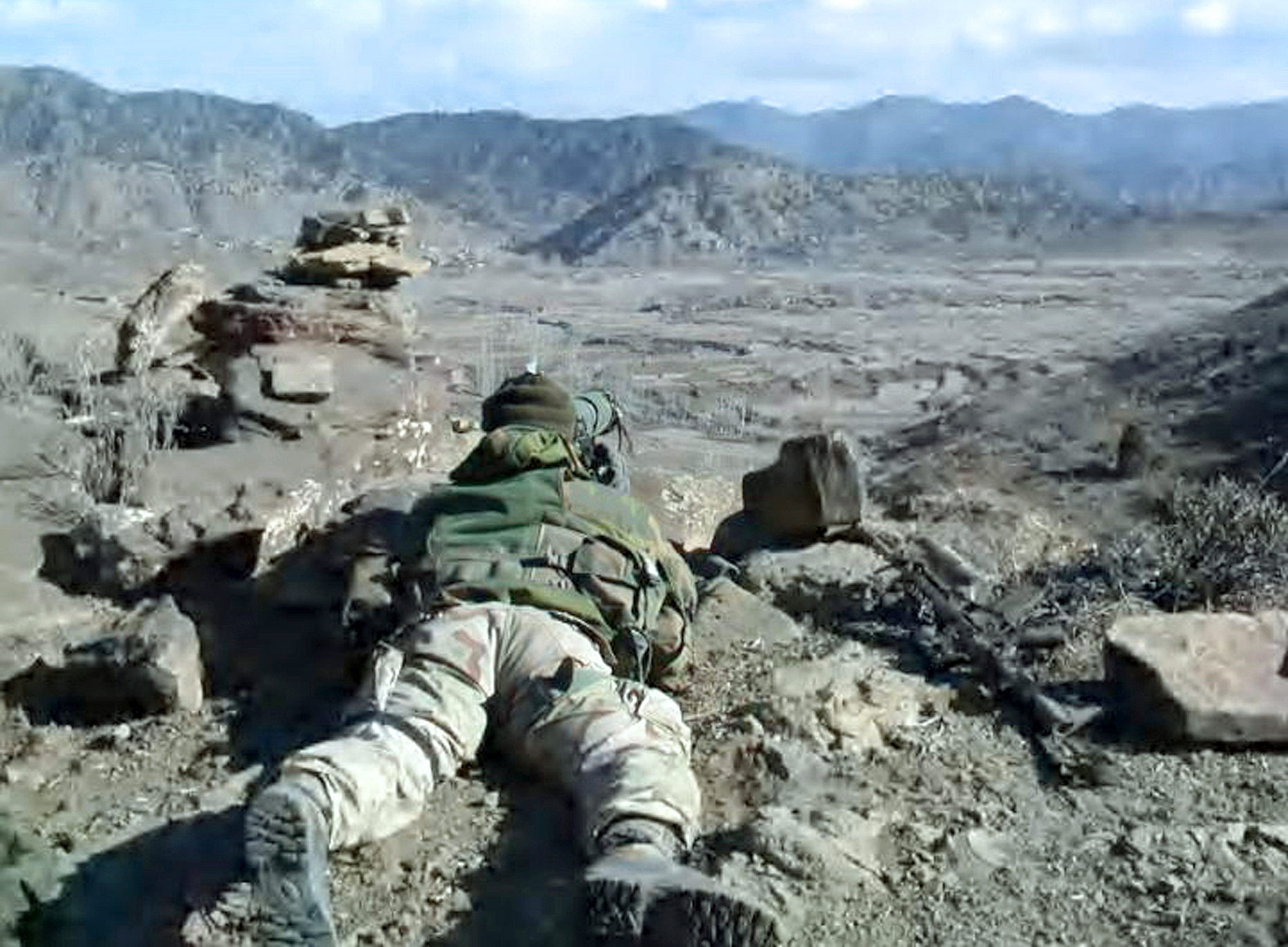
- Norwegian SOF from Task Force K-Bar in Afghanistan, 2002.
- Active: 10 October 2001 – April 2002
- Countries: United States; Norway; Canada; New Zealand; Germany; Denmark; Turkey
- Type: Special operations
- Size: 2,800
- Part of: Special Operations Command Central
- Garrison/HQ: Oman; Southeastern Afghanistan
- Engagements: War in Afghanistan
- Decorations: Presidential Unit Citation

Commanders
- Notable commanders: Robert Harward

Task Force K-Bar, originally the Combined Joint Special Operations Task Force-South (CJSOTF-South), was led by the United States and composed of special operations forces from seven countries. It undertook the first major ground deployment in the War in Afghanistan (2001–2021), operating from October 2001 to April 2002.

== History ==
Originally operating out of Oman's Masirah Air Base before deploying themselves directly in southeastern Afghanistan, K-Bar was under the command of then-Captain Robert Harward, a US Navy SEAL. Harward was full of praise for the troops under his command, and later stated that the Canadian Joint Task Force 2 team was his first choice for any direct action mission.

Task Force K-Bar was part of the Combined Joint Special Operations Task Force (CJSOTF), under the overall command of General Tommy Franks at CENTCOM. TF K-Bar was given the responsibility of southern Afghanistan, was commanded by Navy SEAL Captain Robert Harward, and formed around SEAL Teams 2, 3, and 8 and operators from 3rd Battalion, 3rd Special Forces Group. The task force would primarily conduct special reconnaissance (SR) and sensitive site exploitation (SSE) missions – intelligence gathering at former enemy locations, some 3rd SFG ODAs were also given the foreign internal defense and unconventional warfare role.

In January 2002, another series of caves was discovered in Zawar Kili, just south of Tora Bora. Airstrikes hit the sites before SOF teams were inserted into the area. A SEAL platoon from SEAL Team 3, including several of their Desert Patrol Vehicles, accompanied by a German KSK element and a Norwegian SOF team spent some nine days conducting extensive site exploitation, clearing an estimated 70 caves and 60 structures in the area, recovering a huge amount of both intelligence and munitions, but they did not encounter any al-Qaeda fighters. In March 2002, ODAs from 3rd SFG took part in Operation Anaconda, teams from TF-K Bar and Task Force 64 (1 squadron Australian SAS Regiment) were inserted into a valley in the area of operations and were tasked with establishing their observation posts which "had to be tenable, afford good reconnaissance and cover the identified escape routes or 'rat lines' into Pakistan" according to one of the US planners.

In total, K-Bar ran 42 reconnaissance and surveillance missions and an unreported number of combat missions that resulted in the capture of 107 Afghans and the deaths of at least 115.

In 2004, the units participating in Task Force K-Bar were each awarded the Presidential Unit Citation by George W. Bush for their service in Afghanistan. The Task Force was composed of U.S. Navy SEALs, Special warfare combatant-craft crewmen, U.S. Army Special Forces, U.S. Air Force Combat Controllers, and coalition special operations forces from Canada, Norway, Denmark, Germany, New Zealand, and Turkey. The task force comprised approximately 2,800 troops, 1,300 operating in Afghanistan and another 1,500 based throughout the theater of operations.

In a recent book released in Norwegian about the special forces of Norway, US admiral Robert Harward praised the Norwegian contributions; " I can attest to the fact that the Norwegian special operators were absolutely critical to the success of our operations. They came to the fight with specialized skill sets for operating in mountain and arctic climates that enabled the survival and effectiveness of the entire coalition of special operators. Just as important, was the planning and staff experience the Norwegian SOF proved to the operational expertise of the entire Task Force effort. As a direct result of their partnership, our unit was awarded the Presidential Unit Citation, the highest honor the United States bestows on a military unit for which President George W. Bush personally delivered the award".

== Member states ==
- United States: Navy SEALs (Teams 2, 3, and 8), Air Force Combat Controllers and Pararescuemen, and Green Berets from 1st Battalion 3rd SFG;.
- Norway, ~70 Hærens Jegerkommando (HJK), Forsvarets Spesialkommando (FSK) and Marinejegerkommandoen (MJK);
- Canada: ~40 Joint Task Force 2;
- Germany: ~100 Kommando Spezialkräfte;
- Turkey: ~1 Turkish Special Forces Intelligence Officer
- New Zealand: ~40 New Zealand Special Air Service;
- Denmark: ~100 Jægerkorpset and Frømandskorpset.
