= Operation Jacana =

International Coalition Forces Operation

- Part of the War in Afghanistan (2001–2021)
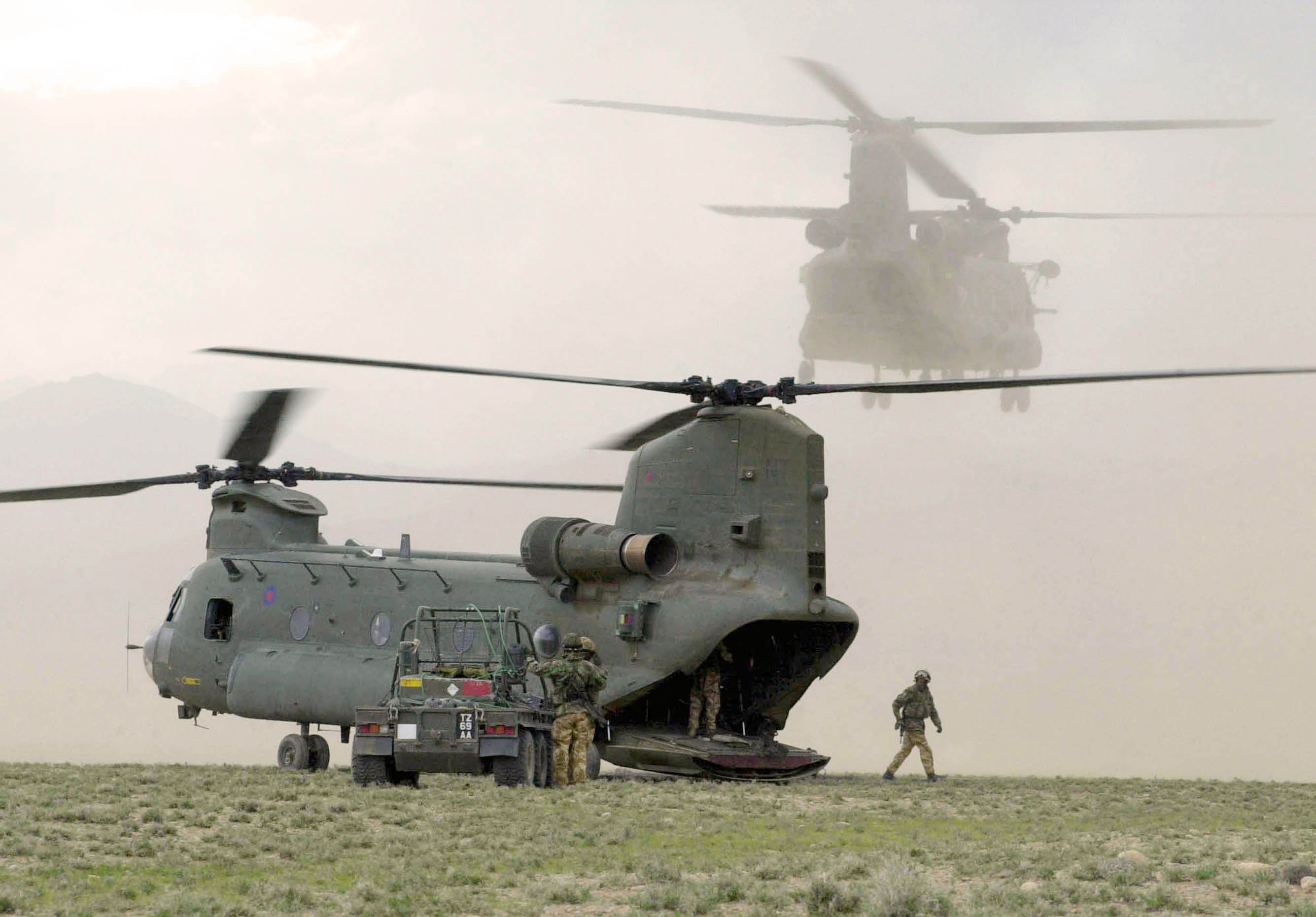
- A Chinook helicopter from 27 Squadron RAF launches after it has embarked troops at a Forward Operating Base (3 May 2002)
Date	April 16–July 9, 2002
Location	Khost province, Paktia Province, Afghanistan
Result	Coalition victory.

Belligerents
Coalition Forces: United Kingdom; United States; Australia; Norway	Taliban; Al-Qaeda

Units involved
(United Kingdom) 45 Commando (United States) US Special Forces (Australia) Australian SAS (Norway) Forsvarets Spesialkommando	Unknown

Casualties and losses
None	None

Operation Jacana is the codename for a series of operations carried out by coalition forces in Afghanistan. These operations were carried out by coalition forces, including elements from 45 Commando Royal Marines. U.S. forces, Australian SAS and Norwegian FSK. Operation Jacana was a follow-up of Operation Anaconda and was intended to capture or kill remaining Al-Qaeda and Taliban rebels. The name Jacana is derived from the name of a species of African bird, jacana, with the animal described as "shy, retiring, [and] easily overlooked".

Op. Jacana included the following "clean up" operations:

- Operation Ptarmigan
- Operation Snipe
- Operation Condor
- Operation Buzzard

== Events ==
=== Operation Ptarmigan ===
On 16 April 2002, a taskforce of over 400 Royal Marines were deployed to Bagram Airbase in preparation for A 5-day operation with the objective of clearing high altitude mountain valleys (up to 11,000 ft), southeast of Gardez of Taliban and Al-Qaeda forces. After a request for support from US forces undertaking Operation Mountain Lion; with Operation Ptarmigan being their contribution. Their objectives included clearing the Taliban from the valleys, destroying a number of harded defences including bunkers and cave complexes. The Taskforce were to conduct joint operations alongside coalition forces comprising: U.S. Army's 10th Mountain Division, 1st Battalion, 3rd Marine Regiment (Task Force Lava), and Afghan National Army (ANA) brigades who had been working on the objectives since the previous day.

The Royal Marine reconnaissance troop supported by the RAF, discovered a number of previously unknown cave complexes. Including a cave in the Shah-i-Kot area. That contained over 20,000 rounds of anti-aircraft ammunition, which was subsequently captured and destroyed.

The operation concluded on the 18th of April 2002 By 20 April 2002, a total of nearly 1,700 Royal Marines had been deployed as part of the task force. with the coalition forces succeeding in their objectives without taking contact from the Taliban or al-Qaeda forces. This supported suspicion that enemy forces had fled across the nearby border to Pakistan; reinforced by evidence that the facilities had been previously used by either Taliban or Coalition forces. Coalition troops were able to secure a "great deal" of papers, maps, radios and other intelligence in the Shah-i-Kot area.

=== Operation Snipe ===
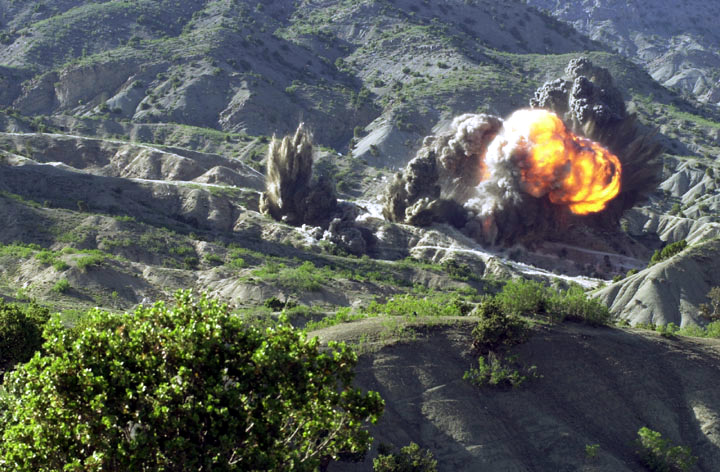
May 10, 2002. Operation Snipe; this was reportedly the largest explosion by Royal Engineers since World War II

In May 2002, 600 Royal Marines and 400 Afghan soldiers supported by U.S. air power and U.S. special operations troops began Operation Snipe, a continuation of Operation Ptarmigan in Patika Province. The Royal Marine force carrying out the operation did not come across any al Qaeda or Taliban fighters (whilst moving into position the marines found small-arms ammunition hidden in a cave and some old defensive positions belonging to al-Qaeda), however on 9 May, the troops discovered caves and removed 30 truckloads of anti-aircraft, anti-tank ammunition and other heavy munitions and military equipment, including mortars, 2 Russian-made tanks were also found outside the cave. On 10 May, British troops destroyed "a vast arsenal of weaponry" (more than 20 truckloads of ammunition and weapons were destroyed in the biggest controlled explosion British forces have carried out since World War II) and al Qaeda or Taliban infrastructure by blowing up an enormous cache of weapons stored in a cave complex. The operation lasted 2 weeks (other sources say 16 days) and ended on 13 May 2002, the operation was part of a much larger operation led by the 101st Airborne Division and designed to show the al-Qa'eda and Taliban fighters, the vast majority of whom were known to be in sanctuaries inside Pakistan, that they could not operate inside Afghanistan with impunity. One reason for the failure of not finding any al-Qaeda or Taliban militants was the refusal by Major-General Franklin Hagenbeck, the US force commander, of several British requests for a blocking force of American troops from 101st Airborne Division to plug two valleys as the Marines moved through them.

=== Operation Condor ===
On 17 May 2002, coalition forces began Operation Condor following an incident in Patika province the previous day: On May 16, an Australian SAS patrol came under fire for five hours from heavy mortars and machine guns and was chased by 20 to 60 suspected al-Qaeda and Taliban militants, Apache helicopter gunships and AC-130 gunship carried out airstrikes killing about 10 people, the rest of fighters are thought to have dispersed into small groups and blended in with local residents or fled across the border to neighbouring Pakistan. The next day, other coalition forces were deployed to assist them where a 1,000-strong coalition force (500-800 were Royal Marines) led by the Royal Marines surrounded the Khost-Paktia region. American, British, and Australian forces were in "blocking" positions as the British Royal Marines swept the area, supported by US attack helicopters and gunships who bombarded the area; the operation was conducted at heights of between 6,000 and 8,000 feet. On 17 May Brigadier Roger Lane, the top British commander in the coalition forces was supposedly battling a "substantial force" of suspected al Qaeda and Taliban fighters in the mountains, but British Royal Marines spokesman Lieutenant-Colonel Ben Curry said on 18 May: "There has been no combat, we have established a forward operating base and are now clearing the area," Coalition jets and helicopters supported ground troops throughout the day. Coalition troops searched the area without meeting any resistance, but a small amount of ammunition including two 120 mm rockets. It later emerged that the militants who attacked the Australians were not Taliban or Al-Qaeda fighters, but rather local tribal militias. Small-scale skirmishes between rival warlords were a common occurrence in Afghanistan's deeply tribal Pashtun culture. It appeared the militia forces had simply mistaken the Australians for their tribal rivals. Once again, coalition forces deployed without finding any signs of Taliban or al-Qaeda presence. On 20 May, Brigadier Roger Lane, the commander of the Royal Marine force in Afghanistan was replaced by Brigadier Jim Dutton, relations between Lane and the head of the US military were said to be poor after US General Tommy Franks allegedly found out about the Royal Marines' Operation from CNN rather than from Brig Lane. He also contradicted the US defence secretary, Donald Rumsfeld, by saying the war in Afghanistan would be over in a few weeks. Mr Rumsfeld publicly disagreed; he reportedly lost the confidence of his men and his junior commanders, and his tactical decisions came across as increasingly "desperate for some success".

=== Operation Buzzard ===
On 28 or 29 May 2002, the Royal Marines began Operation Buzzard: the aim of the operation was to "prevent freedom of movement of al-Qa'eda and Taliban and to deny them sanctuary from which to operate" according to Royal Marine Lieutenant-Colonel Ben Curry. 45 to 300 British Marines from Taskforce Jacana and local Afghan soldiers were deployed into Khost close to the Afghan-Pakistan border, accompanied by several US civil affairs officials on a "hearts and minds" operation; amid fears that al-Qaeda and Taliban forces were plotting terrorist attacks from across the frontier. The Marines conducted patrols in populated and rural areas using a mixture of helicopter, foot, and vehicle patrols and setting up checkpoints; this new method was to be "unpredictable, operating in smaller sub-unit attachments operating in an area sometimes covertly and introducing that unpredictability and doubt into the minds of the al-Qaeda and Taliban."

Caves and bunkers containing arms, ammunition and supplies were found and destroyed. Over 100 mortars, a hundred anti-tank weapons along with hundreds of RPGs, anti-personnel mines, rockets and artillery shells and thousands of rounds of small-arms and anti-aircraft ammunition. Two British marines confronted nine armed insurgents and made them surrender. However, just like in the previous Condor operation, these turned out to be local militias who had mistaken the Royal Marines for a rival tribal force and opened fire.

== Aftermath ==
The operation came to an end on 9 July 2002, the operation had shown that al-Qaeda and the Taliban had abandoned a large-scale presence in the region. Madeleine Bunting criticized the operation, writing in an article for The Guardian newspaper that "Afghanistan is in danger of becoming the most embarrassing chapter in the recent history of British military engagements." In the end, the Royal Marines had encountered only trigger-happy Afghan militias, with no signs of the terrorists that they had been deployed to fight. Nonetheless, the operation did have one lasting impact; it highlighted the need to disarm such militias. This set plans in motion in Washington to build up a national Afghan army to replace such local militias.

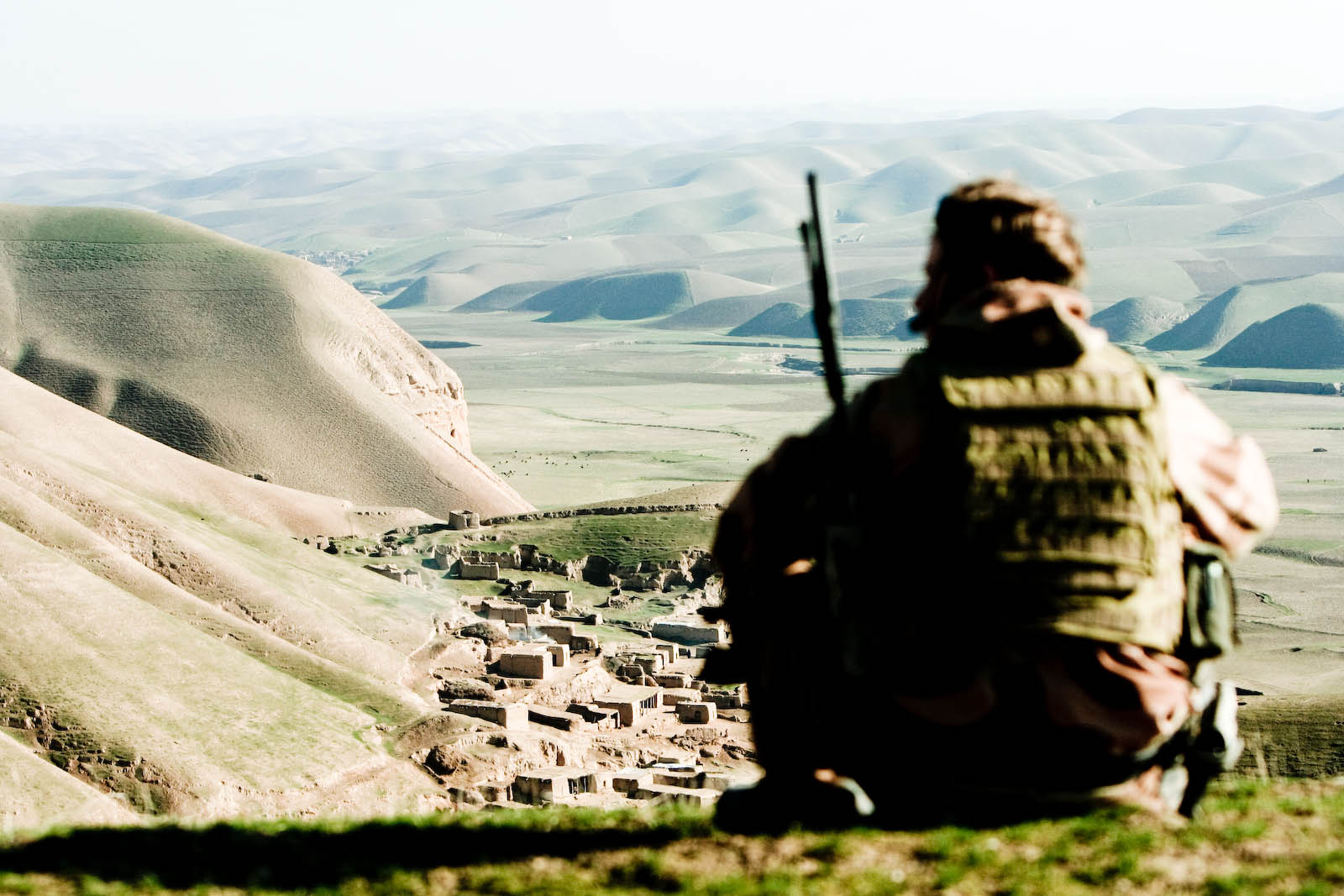
A Norwegian Soldier on patrol in Afghanistan - their expertise in altitude and climate became indispensable

45 Commando had been chosen for this operation due to their expertise in high-altitude warfare, for which they train regularly in the Norwegian mountains; despite this experience, altitude sickness still became a problem with some of the marines, who needed to be airlifted out due to this condition. Norwegian special forces were also specifically asked by NATO to operate in these highland areas because of their experience in high altitudes and cold weather.

== Sources ==
- Special Forces: War Against Terrorism by Eric Micheletti. ISBN 2-913903-90-8
