= 2015 Park Palace guesthouse attack =

2015 armed attack in Kabul, Afghanistan, on international civilians

- Part of the Taliban insurgency
- Location: Shāre Naw, Kabul, Afghanistan
- Date: 13 May 2015; 20:30 – 00:30 (UTC+4:30)
- Target: Foreign nationals
- Attack type: hostage crisis, suicide attack
- Deaths: 14
- Injuries: 6
- Perpetrator: Taliban

Kabul (Afghanistan)

On 13 May 2015, three gunmen stormed the Park Palace guesthouse in Kabul, Afghanistan. The attack is believed to be part of the Taliban's annual spring offensive against NATO's presence in the country.

== Background ==
Shortly before a concert was due to begin, three gunmen stormed the Park Palace Guest House in Kabul. The event was being attended primarily by foreign nationals from Turkey and India but with some US and European nationals in attendance as well. The guesthouse was likely targeted as part of the Taliban's common modus operandi to attack compounds hosting foreigners, which would not mark the first such attack by the Taliban in Afghanistan.

Recent attacks targeting foreigners as well as the March 2015 arrest of a commander of what US and other officials formerly called the "Kabul Attack Network" had previously highlighted a potential for future targeting of foreign, particularly NATO-based nationals in the anticipated spring offensive launched annually by the Taliban. The Indian ambassador to Afghanistan, Amar Sinha, was also believed to be inside the hotel at the particular time, which may have made the location more high-profile.

== Victims ==
Deaths by nationality
Country	Number
Afghanistan	4
India	4
Pakistan	2
Italy	1
Kazakhstan	1
United States	1
United Kingdom	1
Total	14

== Siege ==
Three gunmen entered as a party was being hosted in honour of a Canadian during a performance by an Indian national. A survivor of the attack who fled the premises initially gave media reports of up to forty foreigners possibly trapped inside, with Indian officials confirming at least six of their nationals at the guesthouse. Police officers had initially freed twenty individuals from inside the guesthouse, according to Afghan officials.

Norwegian special forces from Marinejegerkommandoen and Afghan security forces ended the operation shortly after midnight, killing the three assailants while rescuing over fifty people, including trapped guests and employees. Five deaths had initially been confirmed by Afghan security agencies, with the death toll rising to fourteen the next day as the hotel was searched for more persons. The highly respected American aid expert Paula Kantor lost her life shortly after the attack, due to her injuries.

== International reactions ==
- India - After receiving news of the attack while on a three-day visit to China, Prime Minister Narendra Modi tweeted that he was "concerned about the situation" and offered his condolences via Twitter to Afghan President Mohammad Ashraf Ghani.
- United Kingdom - After announcing a British casualty, Foreign Secretary Philip Hammond was quoted as saying that "these callous acts of terrorism against innocent civilians must not be allowed to threaten the future of a more peaceful Afghanistan."

== See also ==
- List of terrorist incidents, 2015
- 2008 Kabul Serena Hotel attack
- 2014 Kabul Serena Hotel attack
- List of terrorist attacks in Kabul
