= Operation Pickaxe-Handle =

British-led NATO offensive in Afghanistan

- Part of the War in Afghanistan (2001–2021)
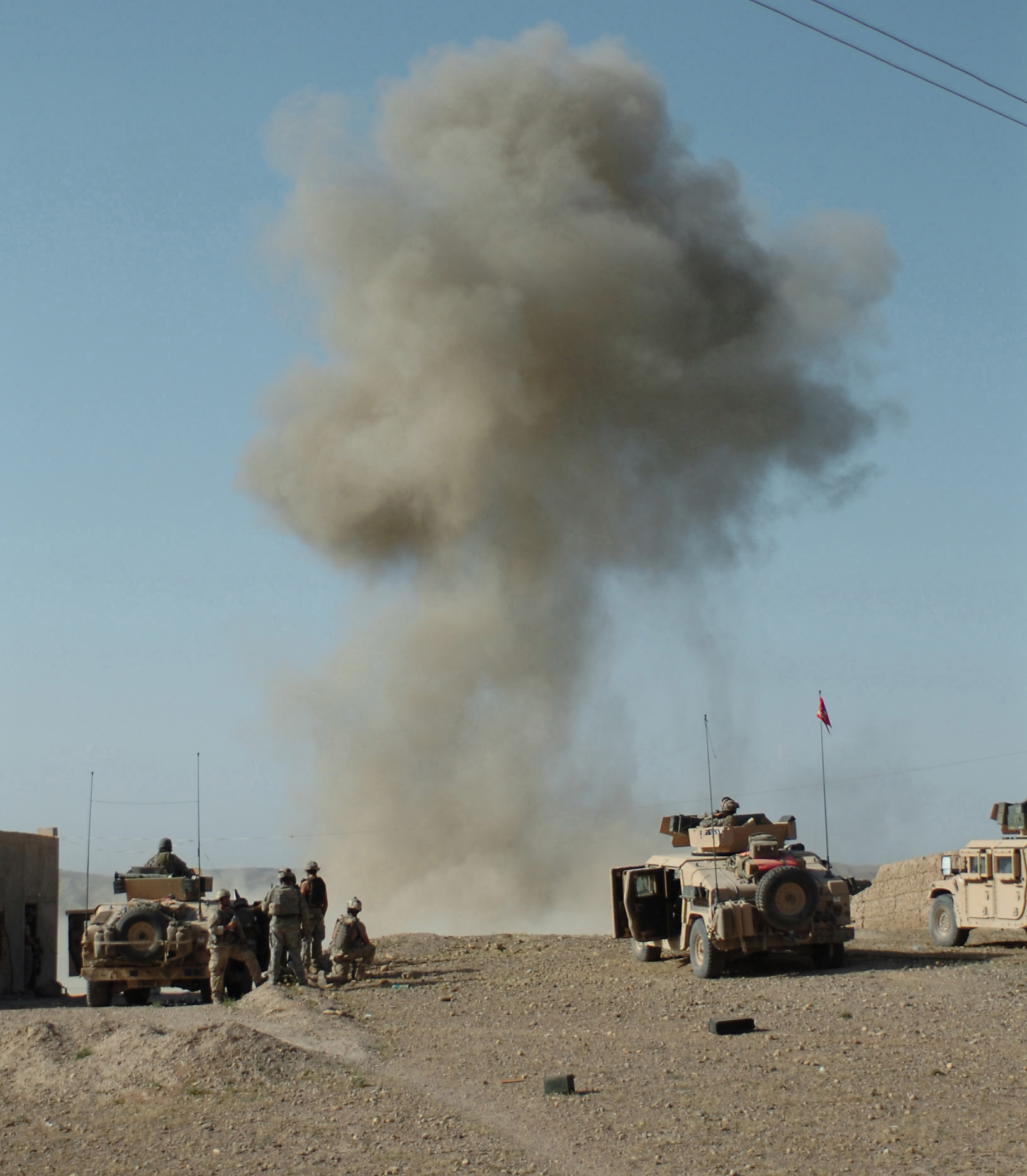
- Airstrike in Sangin, 10 April 2007.
Date	14 June 2007
Location	Helmand province, Afghanistan
Result	Tactical Coalition victory Strategic outcome unclear

Belligerents
United Kingdom; Canada; United States; Estonia; Denmark; Norway; Islamic Republic of Afghanistan	(Afghanistan) Taliban

Commanders and leaders
(United Kingdom) Maj.-Gen. Jacko Page	(Afghanistan) Tor Jan (Afghanistan) Haji Nika

Strength
(United Kingdom) ~1,000 (Afghanistan) 500 (Norway) ~150 (Canada) Unknown (United States) Unknown (Estonia) Unknown (Denmark) Unknown; Total:~2,000	~1,000 insurgents

Casualties and losses
(United States) 7 killed (United Kingdom) 3 killed, 24 wounded (Canada) 1 killed	Over 100 confirmed killed ~150+ (British estimates)

Operation Lastay Kulang or Pickaxe Handle was a British-led NATO offensive in the southern Helmand province of Afghanistan. (The name of the operation is Pashto for "pickaxe-handle".) Lastay Kulang began on 30 May and ended on 14 June 2007, with 2000 ISAF and Afghan National Army troops taking part. The mission was a direct follow-up of Operation Achilles that ended on the same day.

At around 4:00 local time on 30 May 2007, ISAF and ANSF personnel advanced towards the village of Kajaki Sofle, ten kilometres south-west of the town of Kajaki, to remove a Taliban force whose presence threatened the security and stability of the Lower Sangin Valley. During the night, elements of the American 82nd Airborne Division mounted an aerial assault on a Taliban compound. One of the Chinook helicopters taking part in the raid was apparently hit by an RPG round and crashed, killing five Americans, a Briton and a Canadian on board.

By 2 June, NATO claimed to have surrounded several pockets of Taliban fighters.

The Royal Engineers have also started several reconstruction projects in the area, such as digging irrigation ditches, to try to win over local support.

On 5 June, a gun battle and air strikes killed an estimated two dozen Taliban fighters in Southern Afghanistan, the U.S.-led coalition and Afghan government reported.

Upwards of 80 Taliban fighters may have drowned in two separate incidents in early June, when the makeshift boats they were travelling on sank as they attempted to cross the Helmand River. The sinkings were witnessed by NATO helicopters.

A British soldier was killed in a firefight at a Taliban compound to the north east of Gereshk on 6 June.

Another NATO soldier was killed in the south of the country that same day.

On 8 June, a battle and air strikes in southern Afghanistan left 30 suspected Taliban dead or wounded, the Ministry of Defense reported.

== Outcome ==
The outcome of "Lastay Kulang" is disputed. NATO spokespersons claimed the operation was a success, having cleared Sangin and Gereshk of Taliban and securing the Kajaki District. A new governor has been installed in Sangin and Shuras (councils) of tribal elders have been organised to hear their concerns. Conversely, the Taliban claim that they still control much of Kajaki, and some of the Sangin districts. These claims are confirmed by the local residents, who complain that the Taliban returned as soon as NATO and ANA troops had left, and that the security situation has not improved at all.

== See also ==
- British forces casualties in Afghanistan since 2001
- International Security Assistance Force
- War in Afghanistan (2001–2021)
- Provincial reconstruction team
