= Barbary corsairs =

Privateers and pirates in North Africa

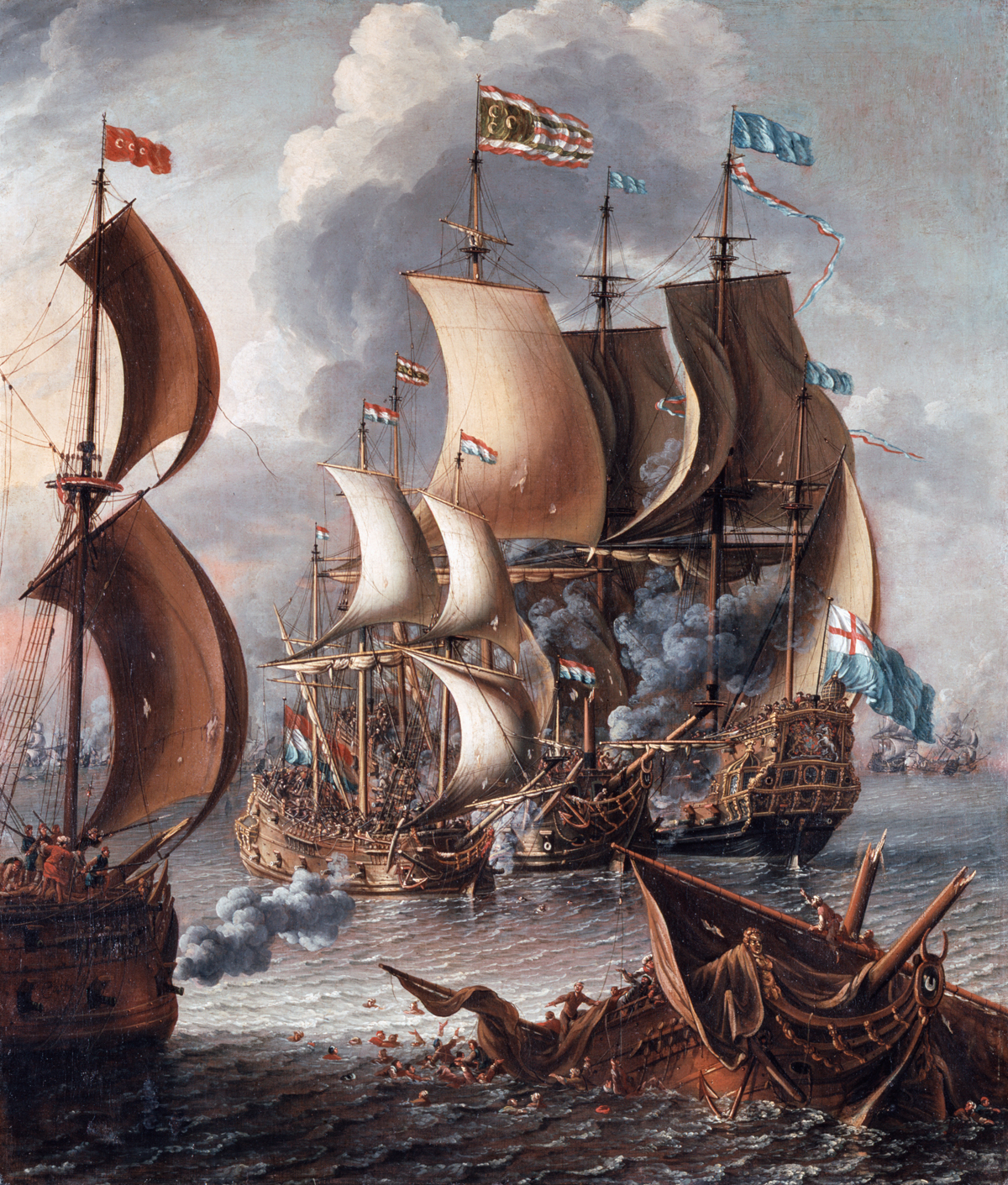
A Sea Fight with Barbary Corsairs by Laureys a Castro, c. 1681

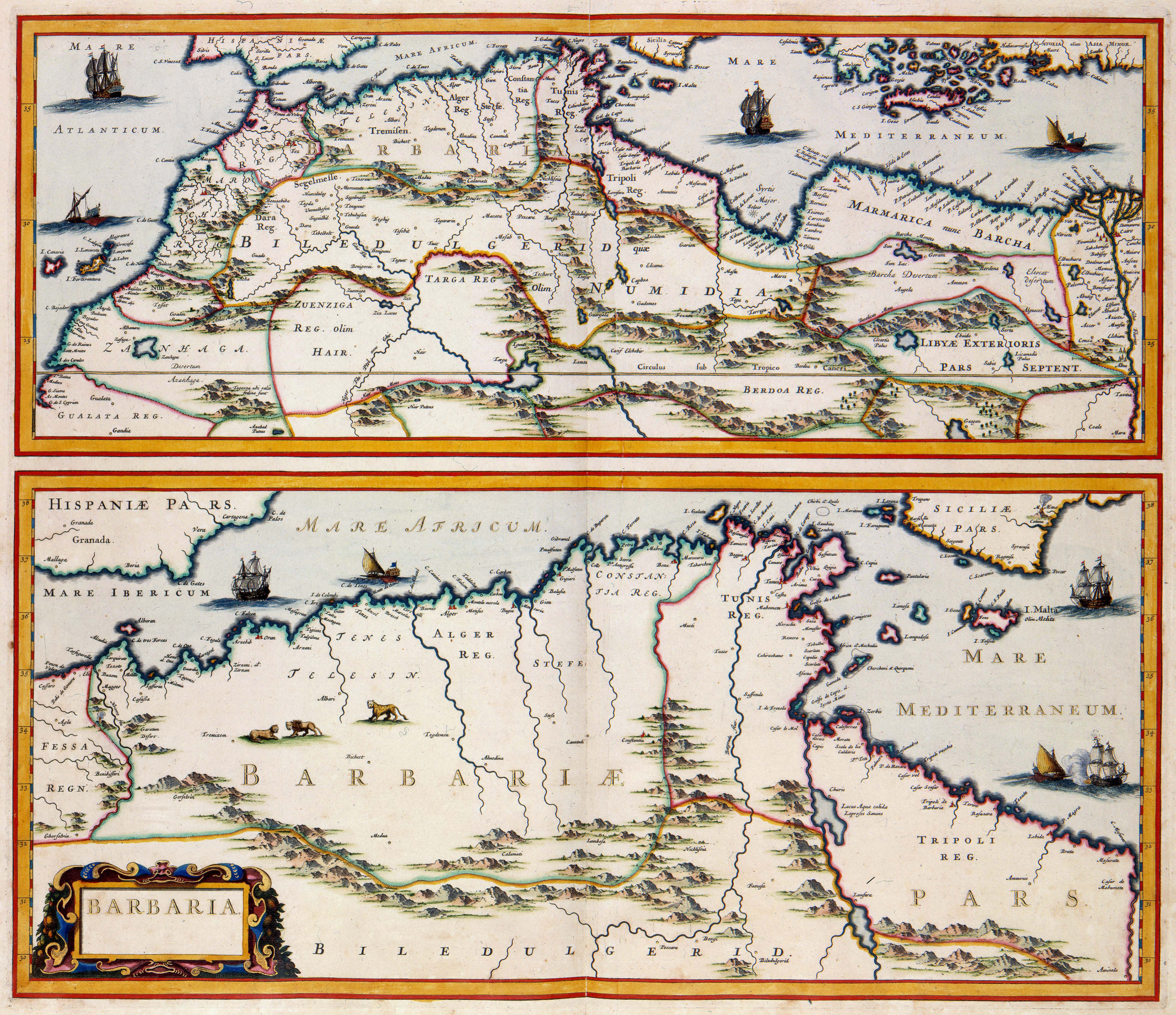
Barbaria by Jan Janssonius, shows the coast of North Africa, an area known in the 17th century as Barbaria, c. 1650

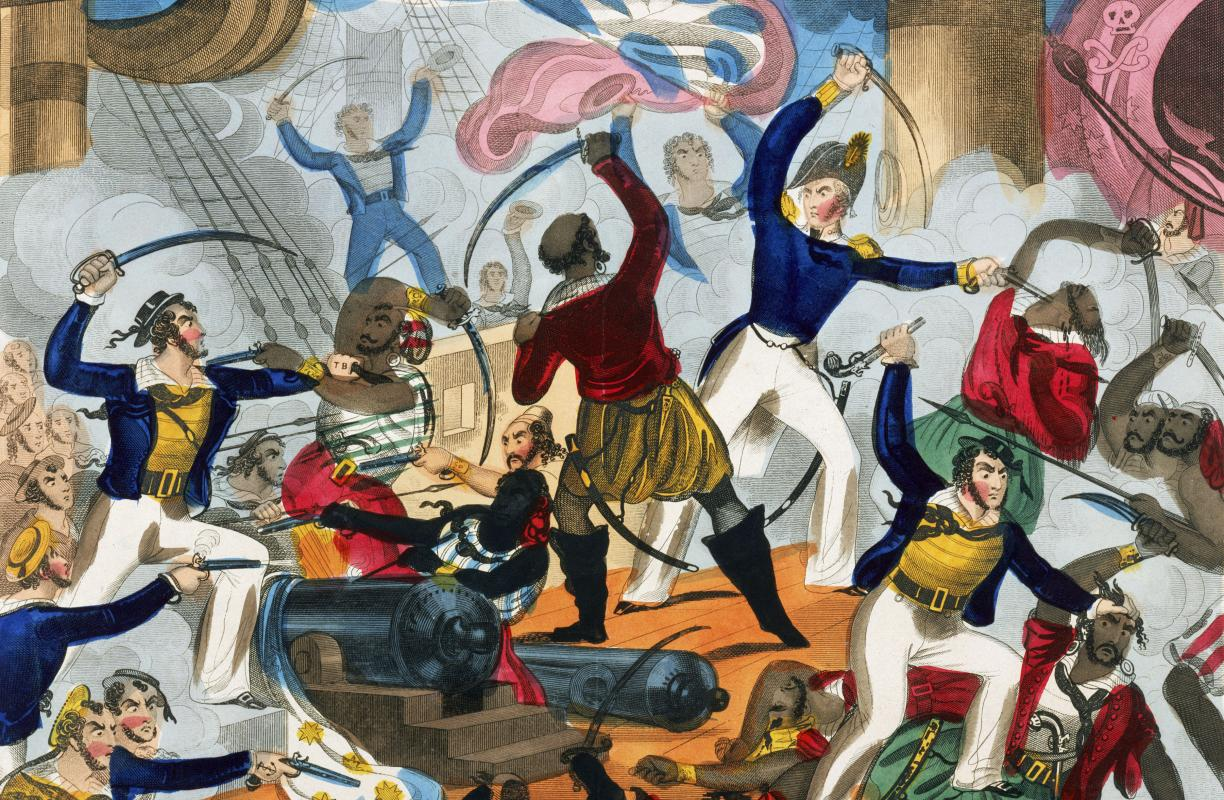
An Algerine pirate ship

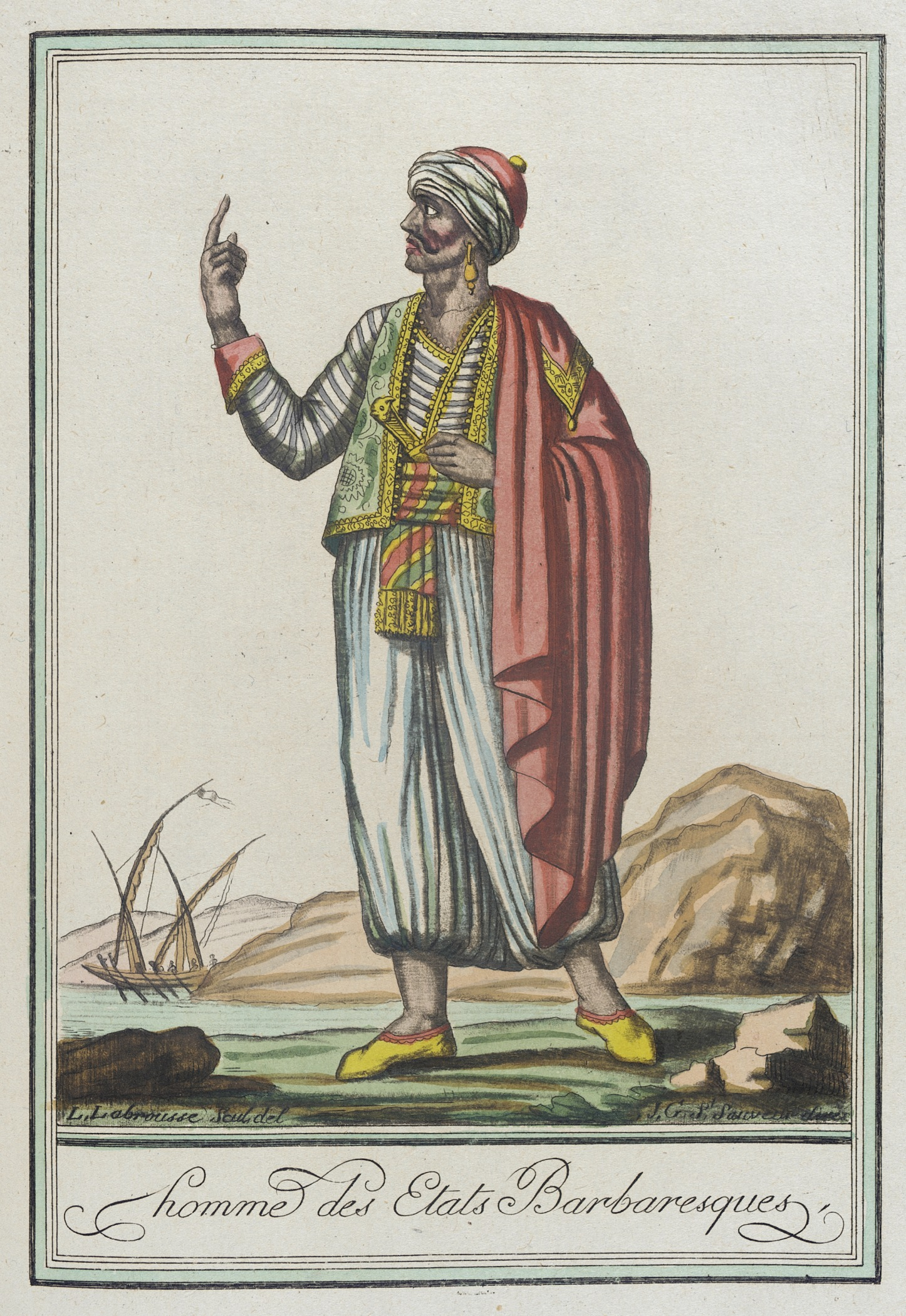
A man from the Barbary states

The Barbary corsairs, also known as the Barbary pirates, Ottoman corsairs, or naval mujahideen (in Muslim sources), were mainly Muslim corsairs and privateers who operated from the North African coast, known in Europe as the Barbary Coast. In addition to seizing merchant ships, they engaged in razzias—raids on European coastal towns and villages, mainly in Italy, France, Spain, and Portugal, as well as Great Britain, Ireland, and Iceland (commemorated as the Turkish Abductions). These included capturing Europeans and selling them at slave markets, known as the Barbary slave trade.

While such raids began after the Muslim conquest of the Iberian Peninsula in the 710s, the terms "Barbary pirates" and "Barbary corsairs" are normally applied to the raiders active from the 16th century onwards, when the frequency and range of the slavers' attacks increased. In that period, Algiers, Tunis and Tripoli came under the sovereignty of the Ottoman Empire, either as directly administered provinces or as autonomous dependencies known as the Barbary states. Similar raids were undertaken from Salé (see Salé Rovers) and other ports in Morocco.

The raids were such a problem that coastal settlements were seldom undertaken until the 19th century. Between 1580 and 1680, corsairs were said to have captured about 850,000 people as slaves, and from 1530 to 1780 as many as 1,250,000 people were enslaved according to historian Robert Davis; however these figures are disputed and have been questioned by other historians. Some of these corsairs were European outcasts and converts (renegade) such as John Ward and Zymen Danseker. Hayreddin Barbarossa and Oruç Reis, the Turkish Barbarossa brothers, who took control of Algiers on behalf of the Ottomans in the early 16th century, were also notorious corsairs. The European pirates brought advanced sailing and shipbuilding techniques to the Barbary Coast around 1600, which enabled the corsairs to extend their activities into the Atlantic Ocean. The effects of the Barbary raids peaked in the early-to-mid-17th century.

The scope of corsair activity began to diminish in the latter part of the 17th century, as the more powerful European navies started to compel the Barbary states to make peace and cease attacking their shipping. However, the ships and coasts of Christian states without such effective protection continued to suffer until the early 19th century. Between 1801 and 1815, occasional incidents occurred, including two Barbary Wars waged by the United States, Sweden and the Kingdom of Sicily against the Barbary states. Following the Napoleonic Wars and the Congress of Vienna in 1814–15, European powers agreed upon the need to suppress the Barbary corsairs entirely. The remainder of the threat was finally subdued for Europeans by the French conquest of Algeria in 1830 and continuous campaigns and colonization by the French during the mid-to-late 19th century.

== History ==
The Barbary corsairs were active from medieval times to the 1800s.

=== Muslim historical narratives ===
Both Europeans (e.g., the Dum Diversas) and Muslims considered themselves to be waging holy wars against each other during this era. European and American historical sources consider these operations to be a form of piracy and that their goal was mainly to seize ships to obtain spoils, money, and slaves. Muslim sources, however, sometimes refer to the "Islamic naval jihad"—casting the conflicts as part of a sacred mission of war under Allah, differing from the more familiar form of jihad only in being waged at sea. Accounts of Andalusian Muslims being persecuted by the Spanish Inquisition—abetted by the Catholic Monarchs of Spain who adopted a militantly Christian national identity when faced with the post-Reconquista necessity of binding their divided territories together—provided more than enough justification for Muslims.

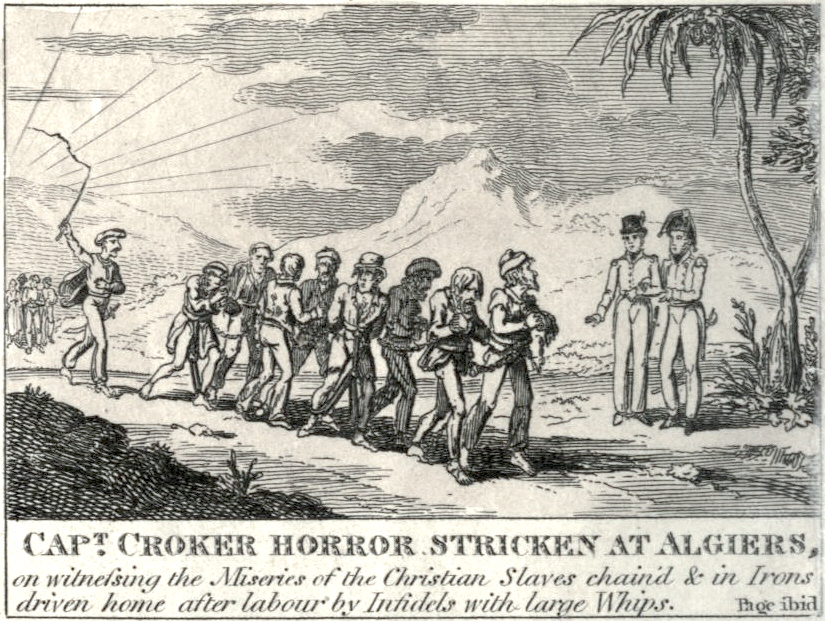
British captain witnessing the miseries of Christian slaves in Algiers, 1815

=== The Middle Ages ===
In 1198, the problem of Barbary piracy and slave-taking was so significant that the Trinitarians, a religious order, was founded to collect ransoms and even to exchange themselves as a ransom for those captured and pressed into slavery in North Africa. In the 14th century, Tunisian corsairs became enough of a threat to provoke a Franco-Genoese attack on Mahdia in 1390 (also known as the "Barbary Crusade"). Moorish exiles of the Reconquista and Maghreb pirates added to the numbers, but it was not until the expansion of the Ottoman Empire and the arrival of the privateer and admiral Kemal Reis in 1487 that the Barbary corsairs became a true menace to shipping from European Christian nations.

=== 16th century ===
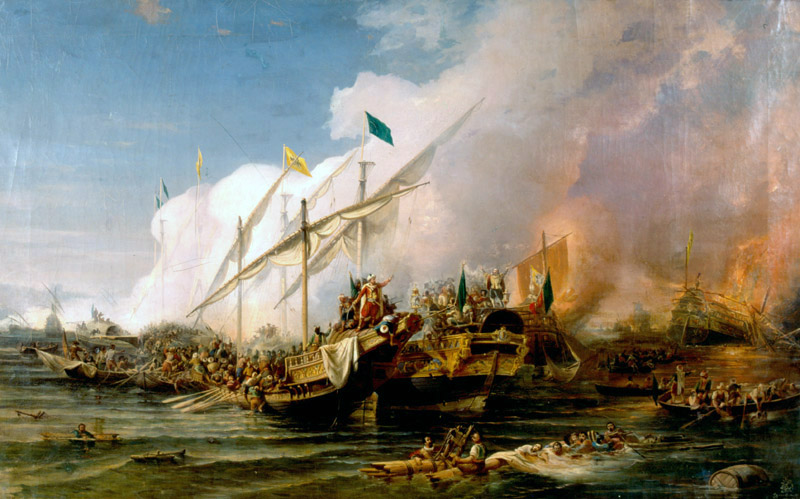
Battle of Preveza, 1538

From 1559, the North African cities of Algiers, Tunis, and Tripoli, although nominally part of the Ottoman Empire, were autonomous military republics that chose their rulers and lived by war booty captured from the Spanish and Portuguese. There are several cases of Sephardic Jews, including Sinan Reis and Samuel Pallache, who upon fleeing Iberia attacked the Spanish Empire's shipping under the Ottoman flag.

During the first period (1518–1587), the beylerbeys were admirals of the sultan, commanding great fleets and conducting war operations for political ends. They were slave hunters, and their methods were ferocious. After 1587, the sole object of their successors was plundering, both on land and sea. The maritime operations were conducted by the captains, or reises, who formed a class or even a corporation. Cruisers were fitted out by investors and commanded by the reises. 10% of the value of the prizes was paid to the pasha or his successors, who bore the titles of agha or dey or bey.

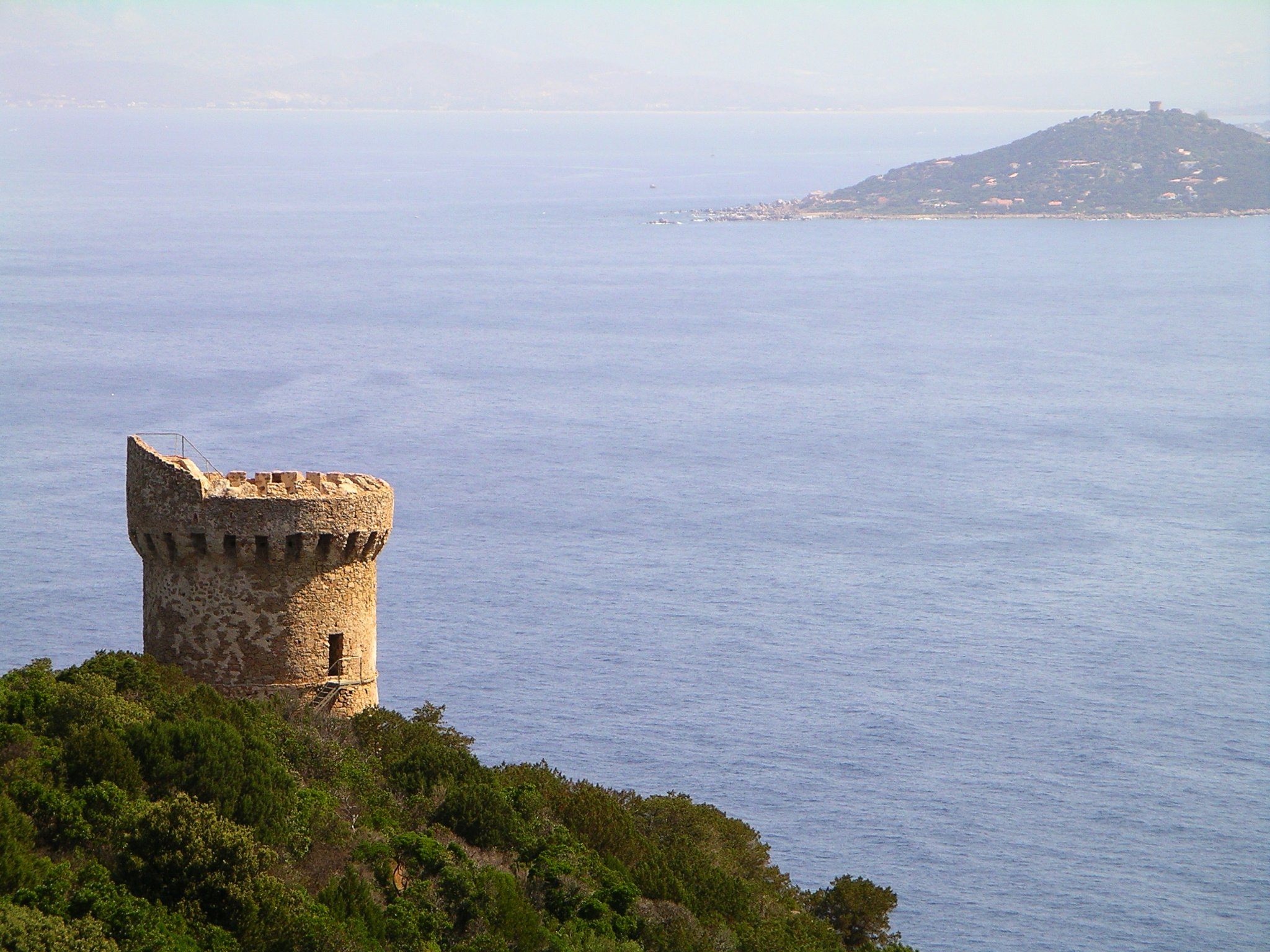
The Barbary corsairs frequently attacked Corsica, resulting in many Genoese towers being erected.

In 1544, Hayreddin captured the island of Ischia, taking 4,000 prisoners, and enslaved some 2,000–7,000 inhabitants of Lipari. In 1551, Turgut Reis enslaved the entire population of the Maltese island of Gozo, between 5,000 and 6,000, sending them to Ottoman Tripolitania. In 1554, corsairs under Turgut Reis sacked Vieste, beheaded 5,000 of its inhabitants, and abducted another 6,000.

=== 17th century ===
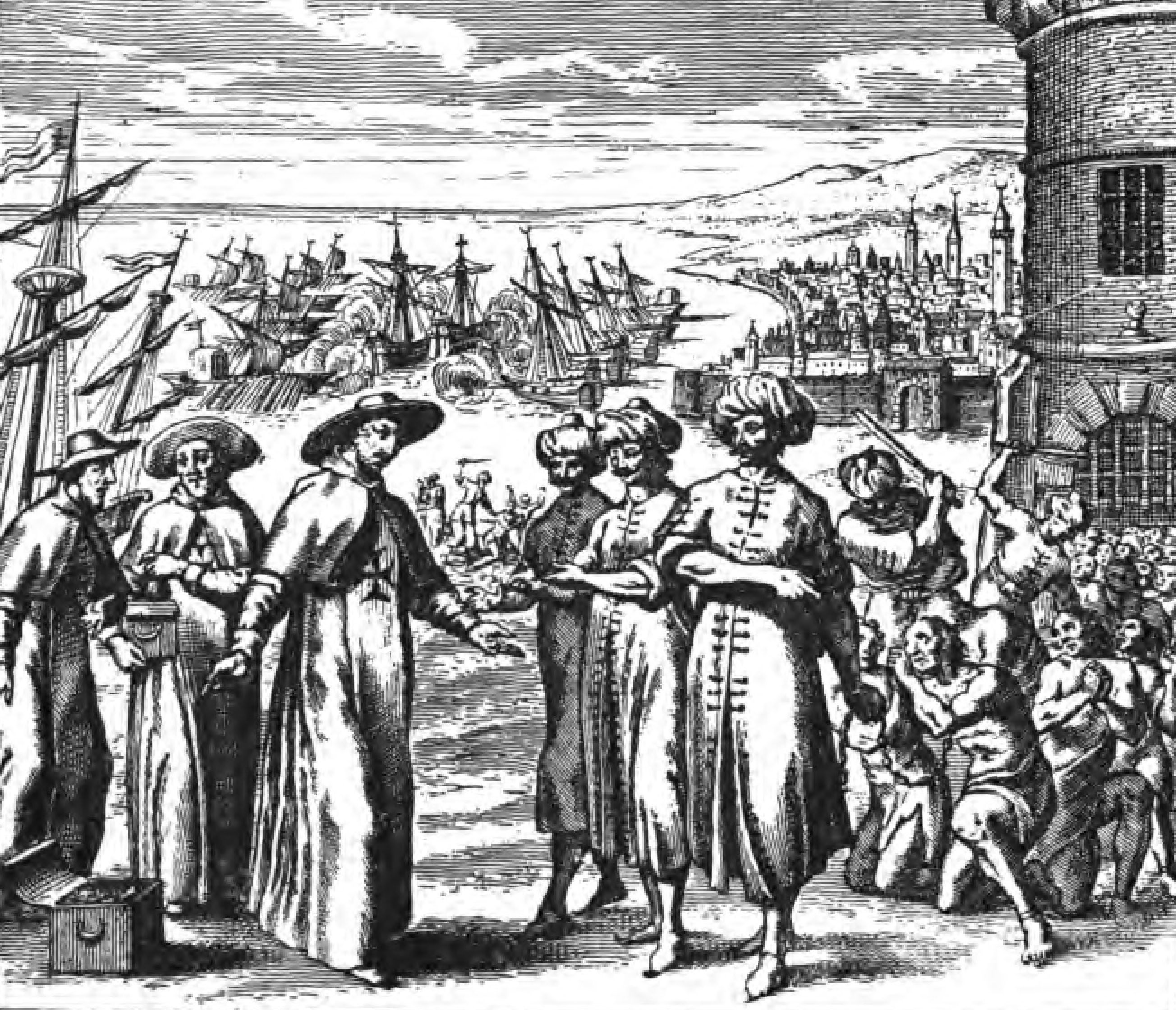
The work of the Mercedarians was in ransoming Christian slaves held in Muslim hands, Histoire de Barbarie et de ses Corsaires, 1637

In the early years of the 17th century, the Barbary states attracted English pirates, many of whom had previously operated as privateers under Queen Elizabeth I. Still, they found themselves unwanted by her successor King James VI and I. Whereas in England, these pirates were reviled, in the Barbary states, they were respected and had access to safe markets to resupply and repair their ships. Many of these pirates converted to Islam.

A notable Christian action against the Barbary states occurred in 1607, when the Knights of Saint Stephen (under Jacopo Inghirami) sacked Bona in Algeria, killing 470 and taking 1,464 captives. This victory is commemorated by a series of frescoes painted by Bernardino Poccetti in the "Sala di Bona" of Palazzo Pitti, Florence. In 1611, Spanish galleys from Naples, accompanied by the galleys of the Knights of Malta, raided the Kerkennah Islands off the coast of Tunisia and took away almost 500 Muslim captives. Between 1568 and 1634, the Knights of Saint Stephen may have captured about 14,000 Muslims, with perhaps one-third taken in land raids and two-thirds taken on captured ships.

Ireland was attacked similarly. In June 1631, Murat Reis, with corsairs from Algiers and armed troops of the Ottoman Empire, stormed ashore at the little harbor village of Baltimore, County Cork. They captured almost all the villagers and took them away to a life of slavery in North Africa. The prisoners were destined for a variety of fates—some lived out their days chained to the oars as galley slaves. At the same time, women spent long years as concubines in harems or within the walls of the sultan's palace. Only two of these captives ever returned to Ireland. England was also subject to pirate raids; in 1640, 60 men, women and children were enslaved by Algerian corsairs who raided Penzance.

Another major figure was Moulay Ismail, the second ruler of the 'Alawi dynasty of Morocco. He was not a pirate himself, but encouraged and benefited from their operations, especially the slaves they captured and delivered.

More than 20,000 captives were said to be imprisoned in Algiers alone. The rich were often able to secure release through ransom, but the poor were condemned to slavery. Their masters would, on occasion, allow them to secure freedom by professing Islam. A long list might be given of people of good social position, not only Italians or Spaniards but German or English travelers in the south, who were captives for a time.

In 1675, a Royal Navy squadron led by Sir John Narborough negotiated a lasting peace with Tunis and, after bombarding the city to induce compliance, with Tripoli.

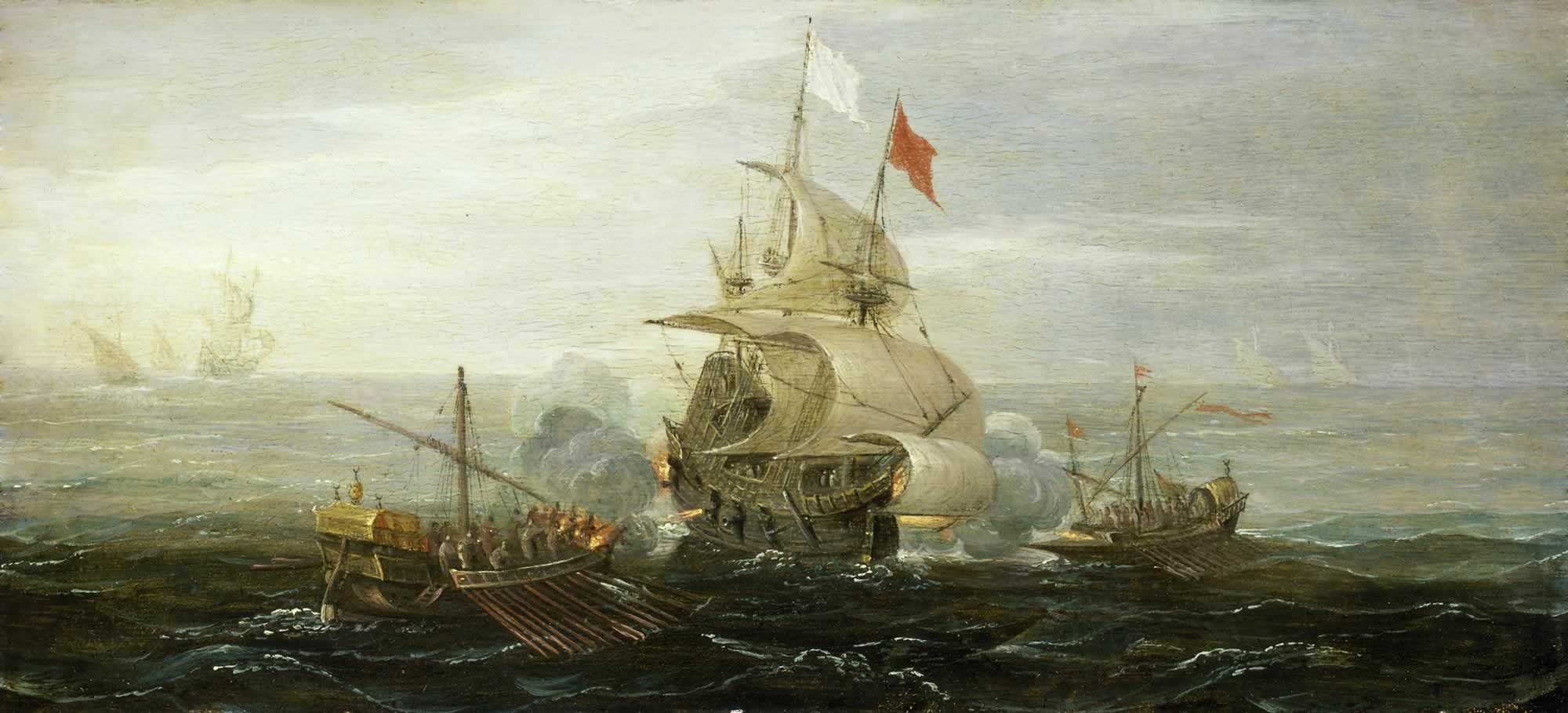
A French Ship and Barbary Pirates by Aert Anthonisz, c. 1615

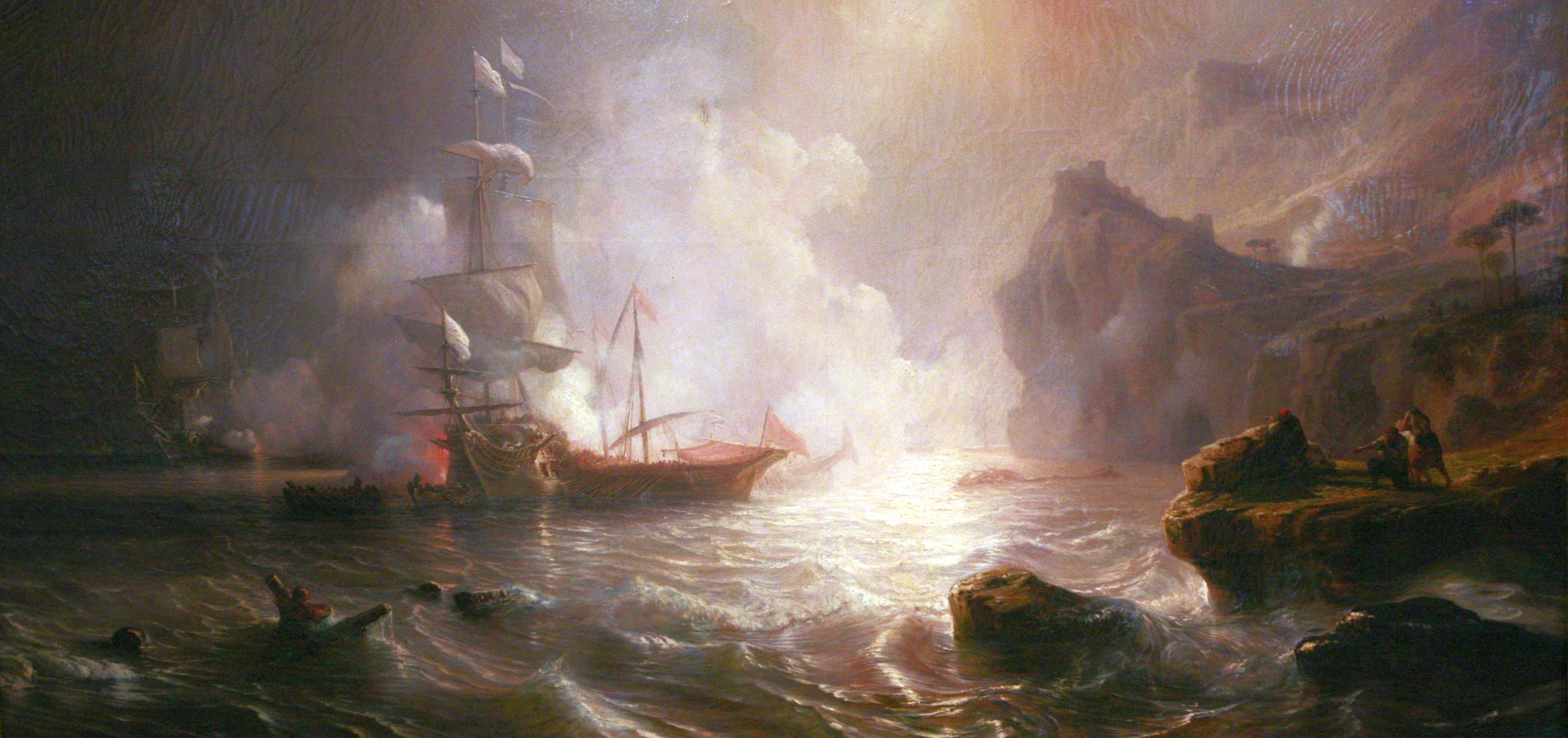
Battle of a French ship of the line and two galleys of the Barbary corsairs

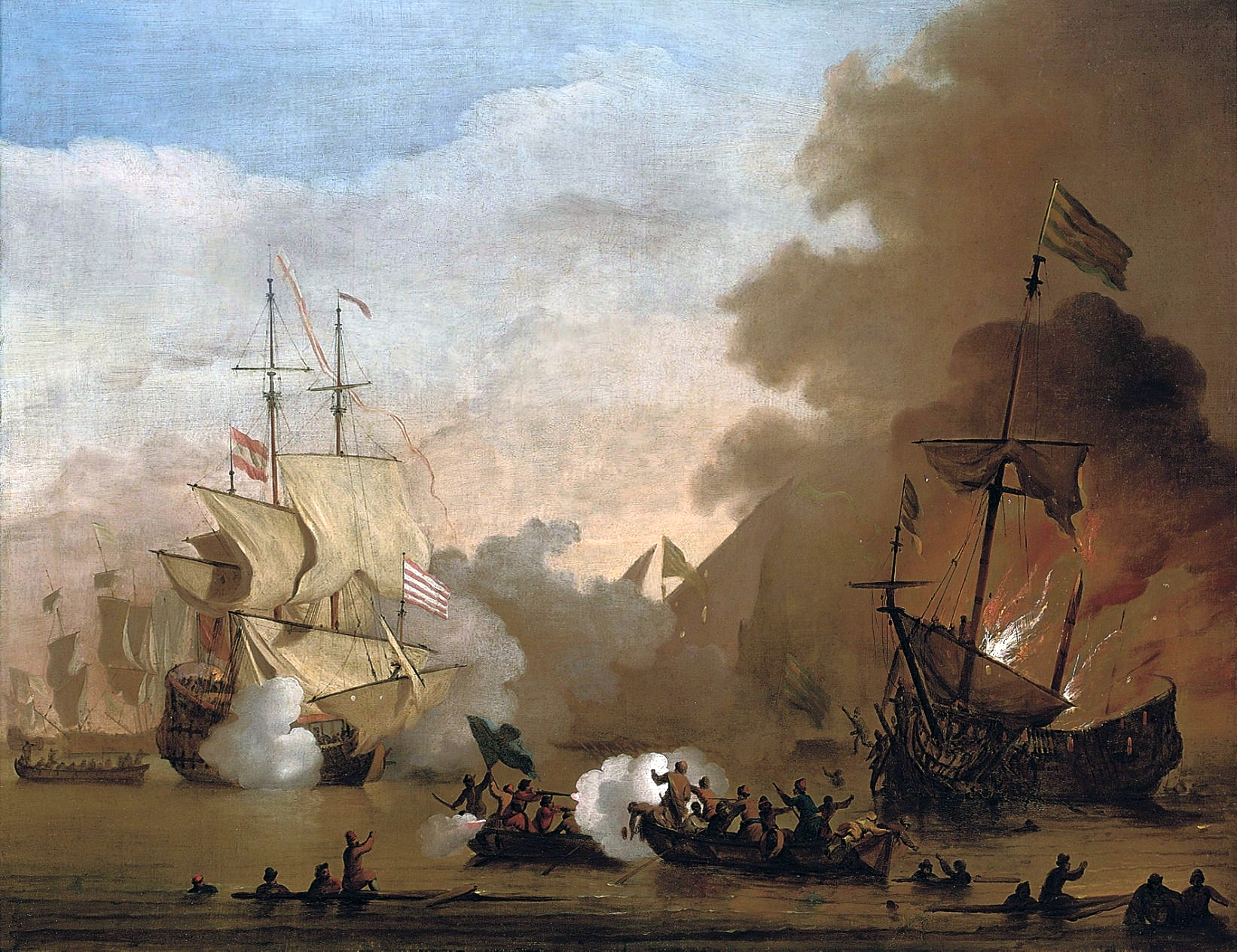
An action between an English ship and vessels of the Barbary Corsairs

Lieve Pietersz Verschuier, Dutch ships bomb Tripoli in a punitive expedition against the Barbary pirates, c. 1670

=== 18th–19th centuries ===
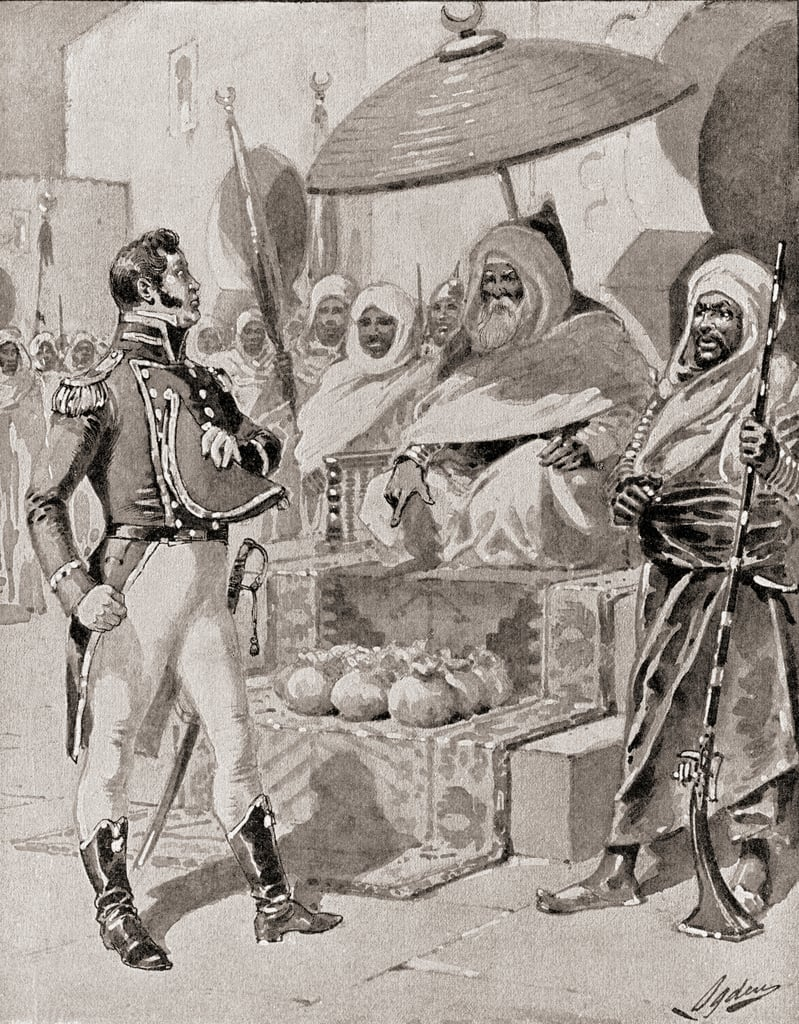
Captain William Bainbridge paying tribute to the Dey of Algiers, c. 1800

Piracy was enough of a problem for some states to enter the redemption business. In Denmark:

At the beginning of the 18th century, money was collected systematically in all churches, and a so-called 'slave fund' (slavekasse) was established by the state in 1715. Funds were brought in through a compulsory insurance sum for seafarers. This institution ransomed 165 slaves between 1716 and 1736.

Between 1716 and 1754, 19 ships from Denmark–Norway were captured with 208 men; piracy was thus a serious problem for the Danish merchant fleet.

Portugal had been at war with the states of north Africa and subject to barbary pirate attacks since the Middle Ages, which prompted the creation of the Portuguese Navy. In 1774 however, the Portuguese Crown negotiated a peace treaty with Morocco. It put an end to corsair raids from that country and provided the Portuguese Navy with access to Moroccan ports from which it could fight Algerian, Tunisian and Tripolitanian piracy. It also opened the path for negotiations with Algiers, Tunis and Tripoli.

Until the American Declaration of Independence in 1776, British treaties with the North African states protected American ships from the Barbary corsairs. During the American Revolutionary War, the Corsairs attacked American merchant vessels in the Mediterranean. However, on 20 December 1777, Sultan Mohammed III of Morocco issued a declaration recognizing America as an independent country, and stating that American merchant ships could enjoy safe passage into the Mediterranean and along the coast. The relations were formalized with the Moroccan–American Treaty of Friendship signed in 1786, which stands as the U.S.'s oldest non-broken friendship treaty with a foreign power.

Portugal blocked Barbary ships from crossing the Strait of Gibraltar but in 1793 it negotiated a truce with Algiers which exposed American ships to attack.

The Barbary threat led directly to the United States founding the United States Navy in March 1794. While the United States did secure peace treaties with the Barbary states, it was obliged to pay tribute for protection from attack. The burden was substantial: from 1795, the annual tribute paid to the Regency of Algiers amounted to 20% of United States federal government's annual expenditures.

In 1798, an islet near Sardinia was attacked by the Tunisians, and more than 900 inhabitants were taken away as slaves.

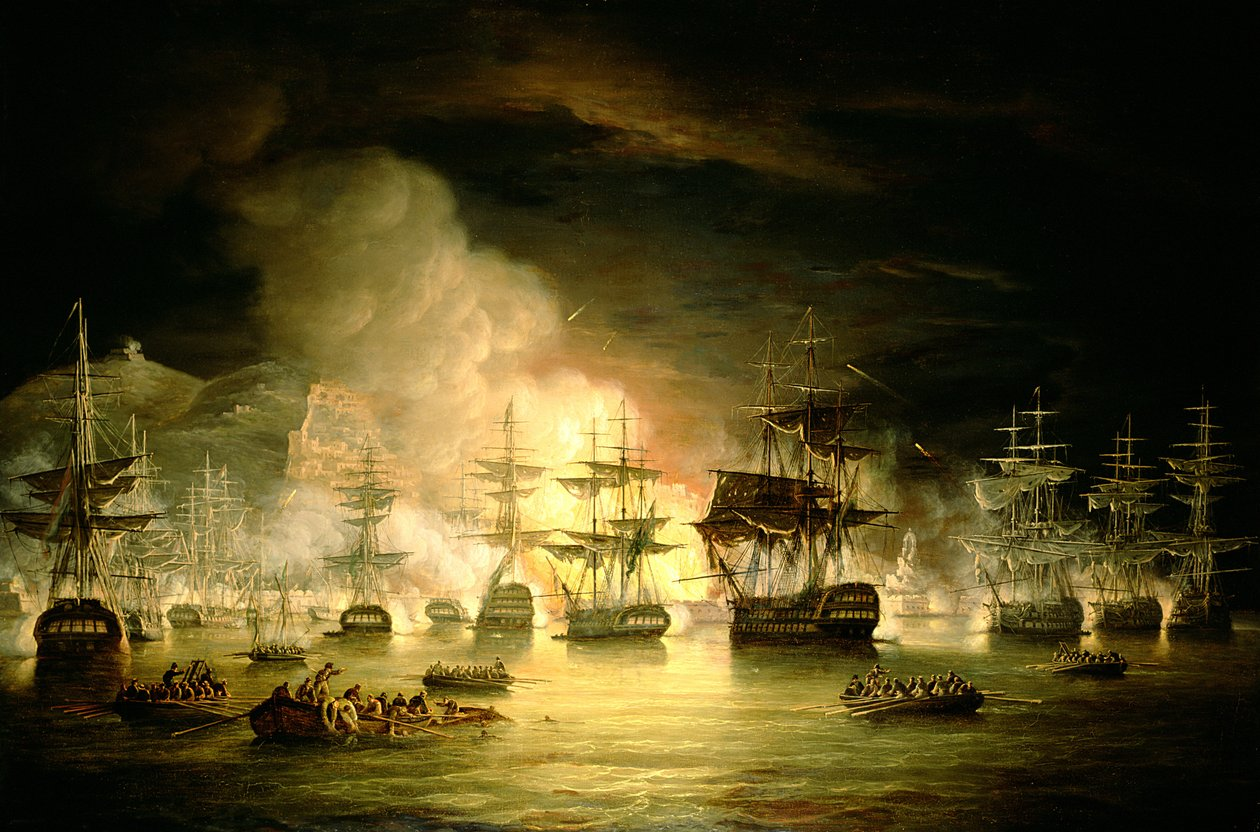
Bombardment of Algiers by Lord Exmouth in August 1816, Thomas Luny

After the ending of the Napoleonic Wars in 1815, the Royal Navy no longer needed the Barbary states as a source of supplies for Gibraltar and their fleet in the Mediterranean Sea. This freed Britain to exert considerable political pressure to force the Barbary states to end their piracy and practice of enslaving European Christians. Treaties were made, but the treaty with Omar Agha the Dey of Algiers was broken by the massacre of 200 Corsican, Sicilian, and Sardinian fishermen who were under British protection. This resulted in the bombardment of Algiers (1816) by an Anglo-Dutch fleet under the command of Admiral Edward Pellew, 1st Viscount Exmouth. The following day when the allied fleet sailed back to renew the bombardment the Dey of Algiers capitulated. On the allied side casualties were 900 dead and wounded and the conflict was considered more ferocious than the Battle of Trafalgar in 1805.

The Barbary states had difficulty securing uniform compliance with a total prohibition of slave-raiding, as this had been traditionally of central importance to the North African economy. Slavers continued to take captives by preying on less well protected peoples. Algiers subsequently renewed its slave raiding, though on a smaller scale. Europeans at the Congress of Aix-la-Chapelle in 1818 discussed possible retaliation. In 1824, a British fleet under Admiral Sir Harry Burrard Neale was fired on and had to threaten to bombard Algiers again before the 1816 treaty was renewed.

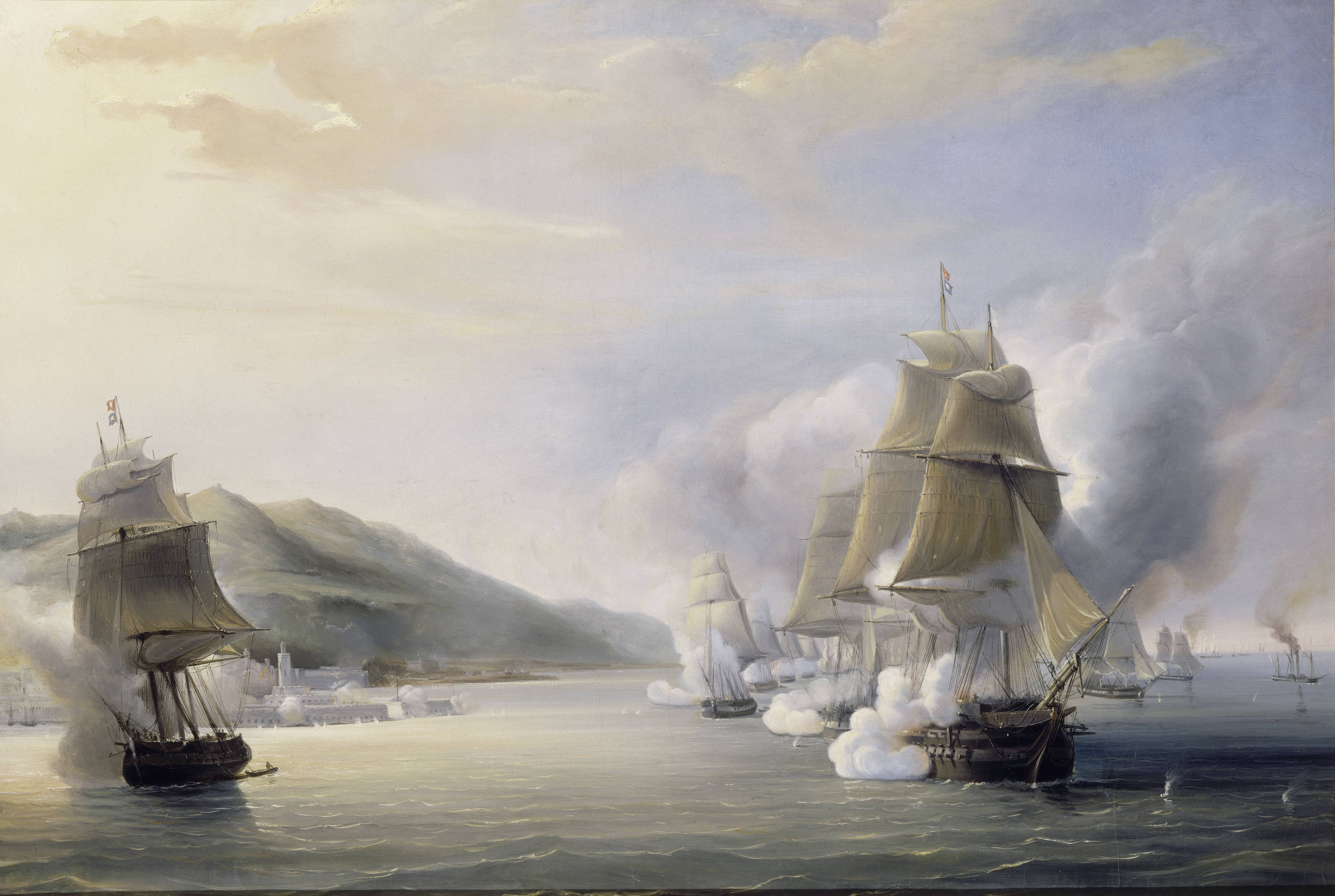
French bombardment of Algiers by Admiral Dupperé, 13 June 1830

Corsair activity based in Algiers did not entirely cease until France conquered the state in 1830.

The Treaty of Larache was a treaty between Sweden-Norway, Denmark, and Sultan Abd al-Rahman of Morocco as a result of the Moroccan expedition of 1843–1845. The expedition was conducted by the combined navies of Sweden-Norway and Denmark to pressure the Moroccan sultanate into agreeing to the reversal of several old unfair treaties and to put a halt to the annual payment of tribute to Morocco in exchange for safe passage through the Mediterranean. The final bombardment of a Moroccan city in retribution for piracy occurred in 1851 at Salé.

== Barbary slave trade ==
From bases on the Barbary Coast, North Africa, the Barbary corsairs raided ships travelling through the Mediterranean Sea and along the northern and western coasts of Africa, plundering their cargo and enslaving the people they captured. From at least 1500, the corsairs also conducted raids along seaside towns of Italy, France, Spain, Portugal, England and as far away as Iceland, capturing men, women and children. On some occasions settlements, such as Baltimore, Ireland, were abandoned following the raid, only being resettled many years later. Between 1609 and 1616, England alone had 466 merchant ships lost to Barbary corsairs.

=== Slave quarters ===
At night the slaves were put into prisons called 'bagnios' (derived from the Italian word "bagno" for public bath, inspired by the Turks' use of Roman baths at Constantinople as prisons), which were often hot and overcrowded. Bagnios had chapels, hospitals, shops and bars run by captives.

=== Galley slaves ===
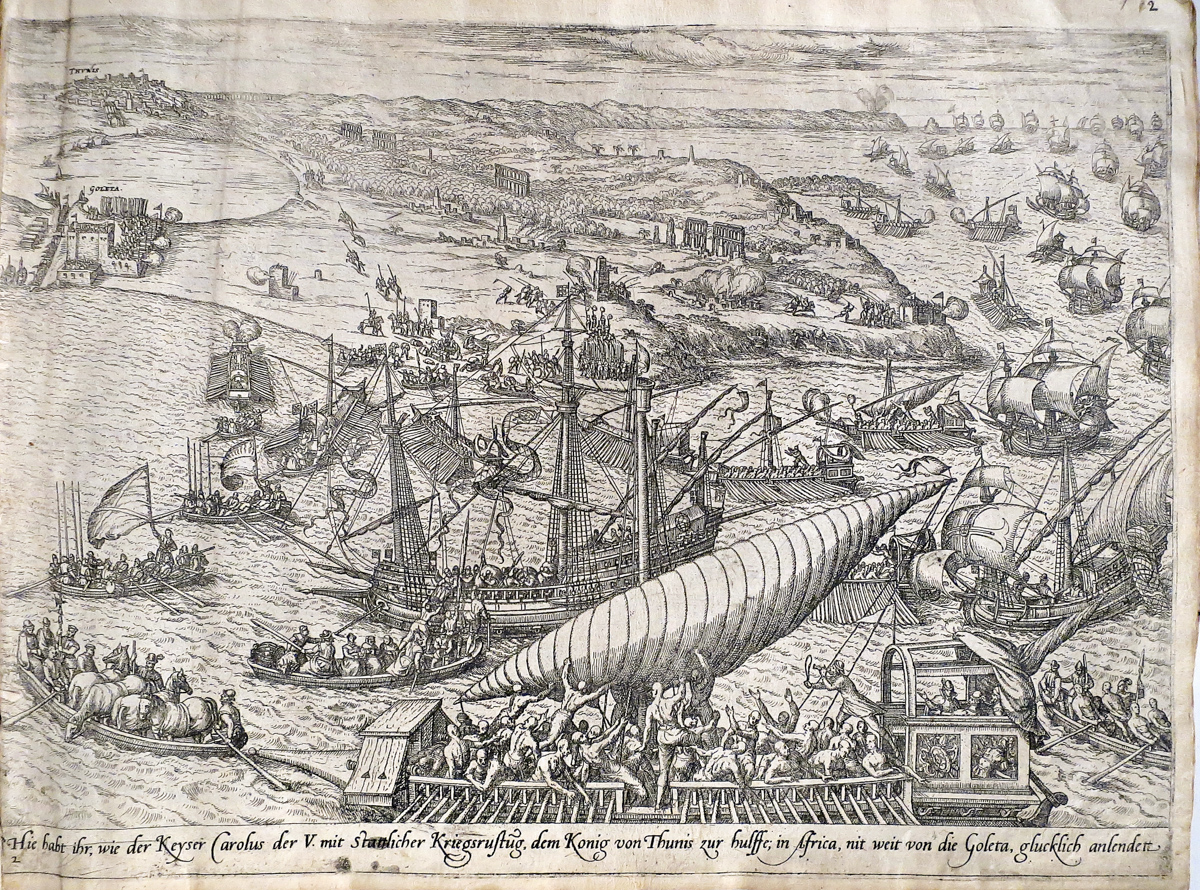
Conquest of Tunis by Charles V and liberation of Christian galley slaves in 1535

Although the conditions in bagnios were harsh, they were better than those endured by galley slaves. Most Barbary galleys were at sea for around eighty to a hundred days a year, but when the slaves assigned to them were on land, they were forced to do hard manual labor. There were exceptions:

galley slaves of the Ottoman Sultan in Constantinople would be permanently confined to their galleys, and often served extremely long terms, averaging around nineteen years in the late seventeenth-century and early eighteenth-century periods. These slaves rarely got off the galley but lived there for years.

During this time, rowers were shackled and chained where they sat, and never allowed to leave. Sleeping (which was limited), eating, defecation and urination took place at the seat to which they were shackled. There were usually five or six rowers on each oar. Overseers would walk back and forth and whip slaves considered not to be working hard enough.

=== Number of people enslaved ===
The number of slaves captured by Barbary corsairs is difficult to quantify. According to Robert Davis, between 1 million and 1.25 million Europeans were captured by Barbary corsairs and sold as slaves in North Africa and the Ottoman Empire between the 16th and 19th centuries. However, to extrapolate his numbers, Davis assumes the number of European slaves captured by Barbary corsairs was constant for a 250-year period, stating:

There are no records of how many men, women and children were enslaved, but it is possible to calculate roughly the number of fresh captives that would have been needed to keep populations steady and replace those slaves who died, escaped, were ransomed, or converted to Islam. On this basis it is thought that around 8,500 new slaves were needed annually to replenish numbers—about 850,000 captives over the century from 1580 to 1680. By extension, for the 250 years between 1530 and 1780, the figure could easily have been as high as 1,250,000.

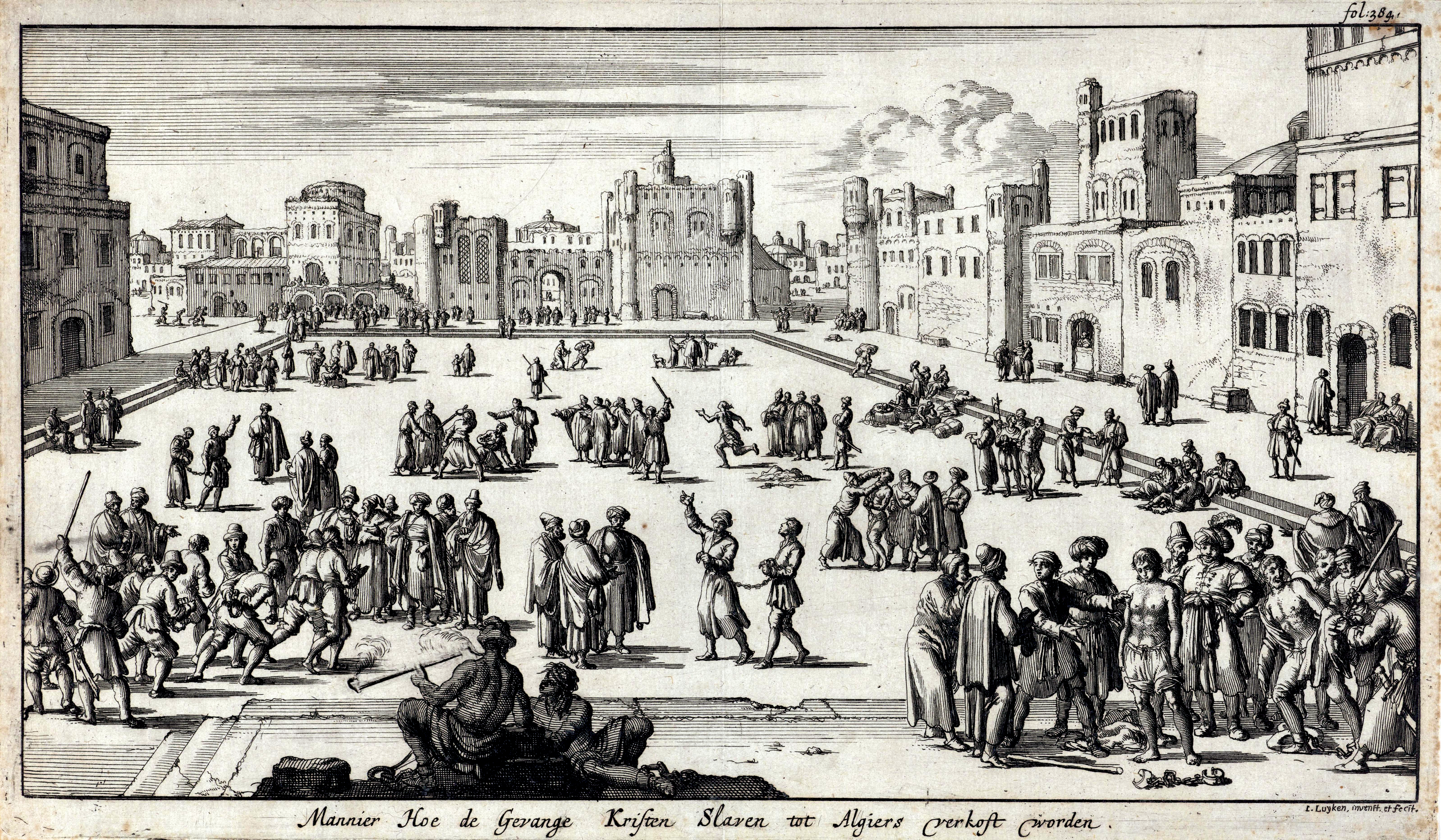
Slave market in Algiers, Ottoman Algeria, 1684

Historians welcomed Davis's attempt to quantify the number of European slaves, but were divided as to the accuracy of the unorthodox methodology which he relied on in the absence of written records. The historian David Earle, author of The Corsairs of Malta and Barbary and The Pirate Wars, questioned Davis, saying "His figures sound a bit dodgy and I think he may be exaggerating." He cautioned that the true picture of European slaves is clouded by the fact that the corsairs also seized non-Christian whites from eastern Europe and black people from west Africa. He wouldn't "hazard a guess about their total". Professor Ian Blanchard, an expert on African trade and economic history at the University of Edinburgh, said that Davis's work was solid and that a number over a million was in line with his expectations.

Davis notes that his calculations were based on observers' reports of approximately 35,000 European Christian slaves on the Barbary Coast at any one time during the late 1500s and early 1600s, held in Tripoli, Tunis and, mostly, Algiers.

=== Legacy ===
The history of Muslim enslavement of white Europeans has been cited by some as contextualising the importance of subsequent European and American enslavement of blacks. Scholar Robert Davis noted that the larger picture isn't so one-sided: during a "clash of empires... taking slaves was part of the conflict," and at the same time 2 million Europeans were enslaved by Muslims in North Africa and the Near East, with 1 million Muslim slaves in Europe.

As Dr. John Callow at University of Suffolk notes, the experience of enslavement by the Barbary corsairs preceded the Atlantic slave trade and "the memory of slavery, and the methodology of slaving, that was burned into the British consciousness was first and foremost rooted in a North African context, where Britons were more likely to be slaves than slave masters."

Coat of arms of the town of Almuñécar, granted by King Charles V in 1526, showing the turbaned heads of three Barbary pirates floating in the sea

== Notable figures ==
According to historian Adrian Tinniswood, the most notorious corsairs were European renegades who had learned their trade as privateers, and who moved to the Barbary Coast during peacetime to pursue their trade. These outcasts, who had converted to Islam, brought up-to-date naval expertise to the piracy business, and enabled the corsairs to make long-distance slave-catching raids as far away as Iceland and Newfoundland. Infamous corsair Henry Mainwaring, who was initially a lawyer and pirate-hunter, later returned home to a royal pardon. Mainwaring later wrote a book about the practise of piracy in the Mediterranean, aptly titled the Discourse of Pirates. In the book, Mainwaring outlined potential methods to hunt down and eliminate piracy.

Native Maghrebins and Moorish exiles from Spain were always to remain active as corsairs in North Africa throughout the fifteenth and sixteenth centuries, but it was Ottoman corsairs under Kemal Reis, moving to the Maghreb around 1487, who ushered in the great days of the Barbary corsairs.

=== Barbarossa brothers ===
==== Oruç Barbarossa ====
The most famous of the corsairs in North Africa were the Barbarossa brothers, Aruj and Khayr al-Din. They, and two less well-known brothers, all became Barbary corsairs in the service of the Ottoman Empire who later became "Kings" when they established a new state in the Maghreb known as the Ottoman Regency of Algiers. They were called the Barbarossas (Italian for Redbeards) after the red beard of Oruç, the eldest. Oruç captured the island of Djerba for the Hafsids in 1502 or 1503. He often attacked Spanish coasts and their territories on the coast of North Africa; during one failed attempt in Béjaia in 1512 he lost his left arm to a cannonball. The eldest Barbarossa also went to capture Algiers in 1516. Well aided by his Berber allies from the Kingdom of Kuku, he vanquished a Spanish expedition intended to replace the Spanish vassal ruler of Algiers that he executed with his son along with everybody he suspected would oppose him in favor of his Spanish foes, including local Zayyanid rulers. He was finally captured and killed by the Spanish in Tlemcen in 1518, and put on display.

==== Hızır Hayreddin Barbarossa ====
Oruç, based mainly on land, was not the best-known of the Barbarossas. His youngest brother Hızır (later called Hayreddin or Kheir ed-Din) was a more traditional corsair. After capturing many crucial coastal areas, Hayreddin was appointed admiral-in-chief of the Ottoman sultan's fleet. Under his command the Ottoman Empire was able to gain and keep control of the Mediterranean for over thirty years. Barbaros Hızır Hayreddin Pasha died in 1546 of a fever, possibly the plague.

=== Captain Jack Ward ===
English corsair Jack, or John, Ward was once called "beyond doubt the greatest scoundrel that ever sailed from England" by the English ambassador to Venice. Ward was a privateer for Queen Elizabeth during her war with Spain; after the end of the war, he became a corsair. With some associates he captured a ship in about 1603 and sailed it to Tunis; he and his crew converted to Islam. He was successful and became rich. He introduced heavily armed square-rigged ships, used instead of galleys, to the North African area, a major reason for the Barbary's future dominance of the Mediterranean. He died of plague in 1622.

=== Sayyida al-Hurra ===
Sayyida al-Hurra was a female Muslim cleric, merchant, governor of Tétouan, and later the wife of the sultan of Morocco. She was born around 1491 in the city of Chefchaouen, she came from a family of noble Andalusian origins from the Emirate of Granada, but her family was forced to flee to Morocco to escape the Reconquista. In Morocco, she gathered a crew largely of exiled Moors, and launched pirate expeditions against Spain and Portugal to avenge the Reconquista, protect Morocco from Christian pirates, and seek riches and glory. Sayyida al-Hurra became wealthy and renowned enough for the Sultan of Morocco, Ahmad al-Wattasi to make her his queen. Notably, however, she refused to marry in his capital of Fez, and would not get married but in Tétouan, of which she was governor. This was the first and only time in history that a Moroccan monarch married away from their capital.

=== Jan Janszoon ===
Jan Janszoon van Haarlem or Murat Reis was a Dutch privateer born in Holland in 1570 and became among the most infamous and renowned Barbary Corsair of the 17th-century. He began his career as a privateer around 1600 using a Letter of marque to harass Spanish ships. During this period in his career, he worked with both European and Muslim pirates. In 1618, he was captured in the Canary Islands by Algerian pirates and moved to Algiers, forced to convert to Islam and integrate into Moorish society. He moved to Salé, Morocco in 1619 and changed his name to Mourad, passionately embracing his conversion to Islam. He was declared the pirate President of Salé, an autonomous pirate City-state which declared independence from the Moroccan Sultan in 1619. Though, his rule over the city was largely ceremonial. From 1627-1640 Mourad engaged in many successful pirate raids, including raids on Bristol, where he captured the island Lundy, and used it as a base for future piracy till 1632. He continued to raid the Balearics, Corisca, Sicily, and fought the Venetians in Cyprus and Crete. It is widely believed Mourad the Younger was a primary player in the Turkish Abductions of 1627, where Barbary pirates raided Grindavík and took hundreds of hostages as slaves. In 1635 Mourad was captured by the Knights of Malta near the coast of Tunis. He was accordingly imprisoned in a Maltese dungeon and tortured, and escaped in 1640 back to Morocco where he resided in the Castle of Maladia. After 1641, his whereabouts and death are shrouded in obscurity and unknown.

=== Raïs Hamidou ===
Hamidou ben Ali, known as Raïs Hamidou (Arabic: الرايس حميدو), or Amidon in American literature, born around 1770, and died on 17 June 1815, near Cape Gata off the coast of southern Spain, was an Algerian corsair. He captured up to 200 ships during his career. Hamidou ensured the prosperity of the Deylik of Algiers, and gave it its last glory before the French invasion. His biography is relatively well known because the French archivist Albert Devoulx has found important documents, including a precious register of prizes opened by the authorities of the Deylik in 1765. Songs and legends have also taken hold of this charismatic character.

=== Other famous Barbary corsairs ===
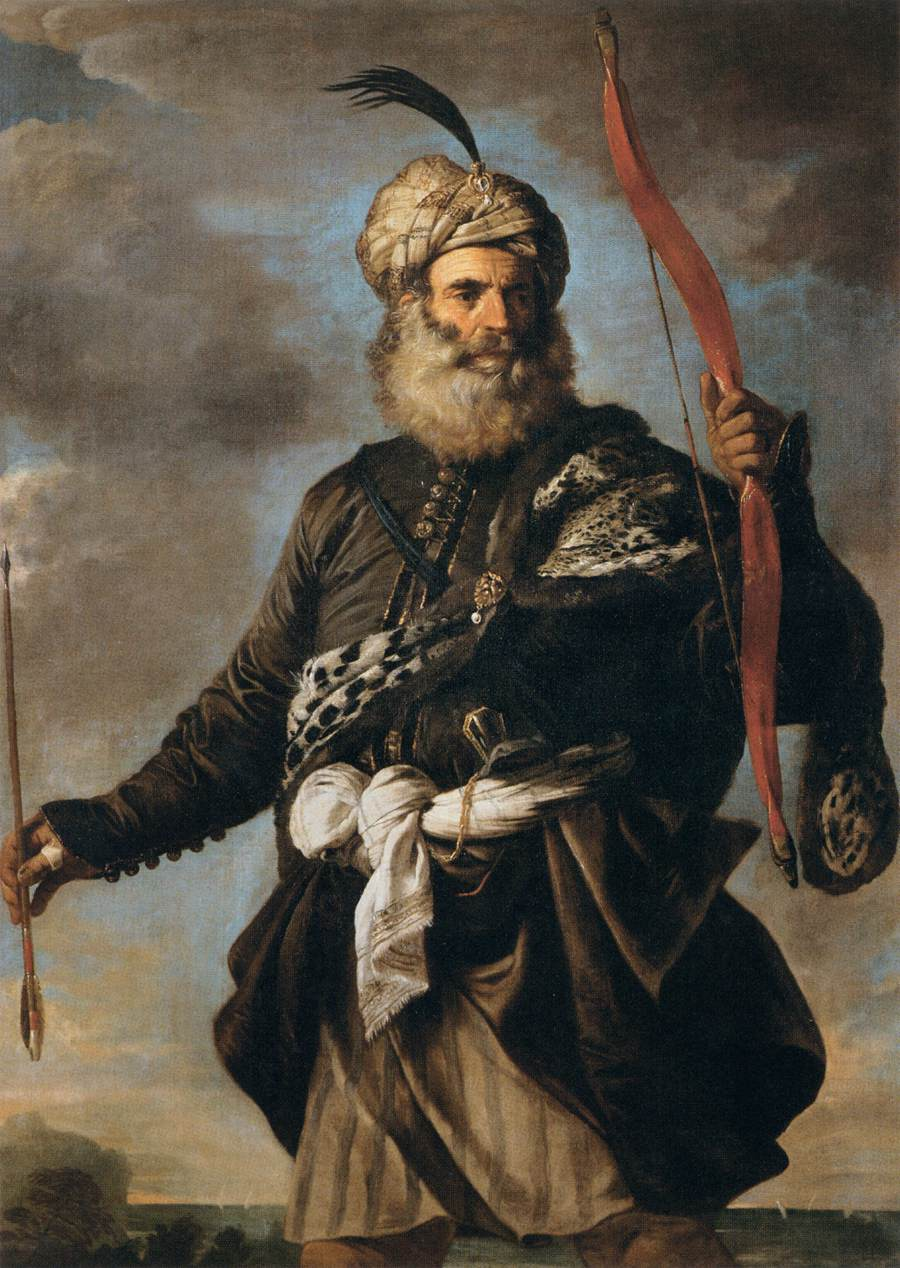
A Barbary pirate, Pier Francesco Mola, 1650

- Kemal Reis (c. 1451 – 1511)
- Mohamed Ben Hassan (c. 1688 – 1724)
- Muhammad I Pasha (c. 1688–1784)
- Hasan Pasha (c. 1517–1572)
- Gedik Ahmed Pasha (died 1482)
- Sinan Reis (died 1546)
- Piri Reis (died 1554 or 1555)
- Turgut Reis (1485–1565)
- Sinan Pasha (died 1553)
- Kurtoğlu Muslihiddin Reis (1487 – c. 1535)
- Kurtoğlu Hızır Reis
- Salih Reis (c. 1488–1568)
- Seydi Ali Reis (1498–1563)
- Piyale Pasha (c. 1515–1578)
- Uluç Ali Reis or Giovanni Dionigi (1519–1587)
- Ali Bitchin (c. 1560–1645)
- Simon de Danser or Simon Reis (c. 1579 – c. 1611)
- Ivan-Dirkie de Veenboer or Sulayman Reis (died 1620)
- Murat Reis the Elder (c. 1534 – 1638)

== In fiction ==
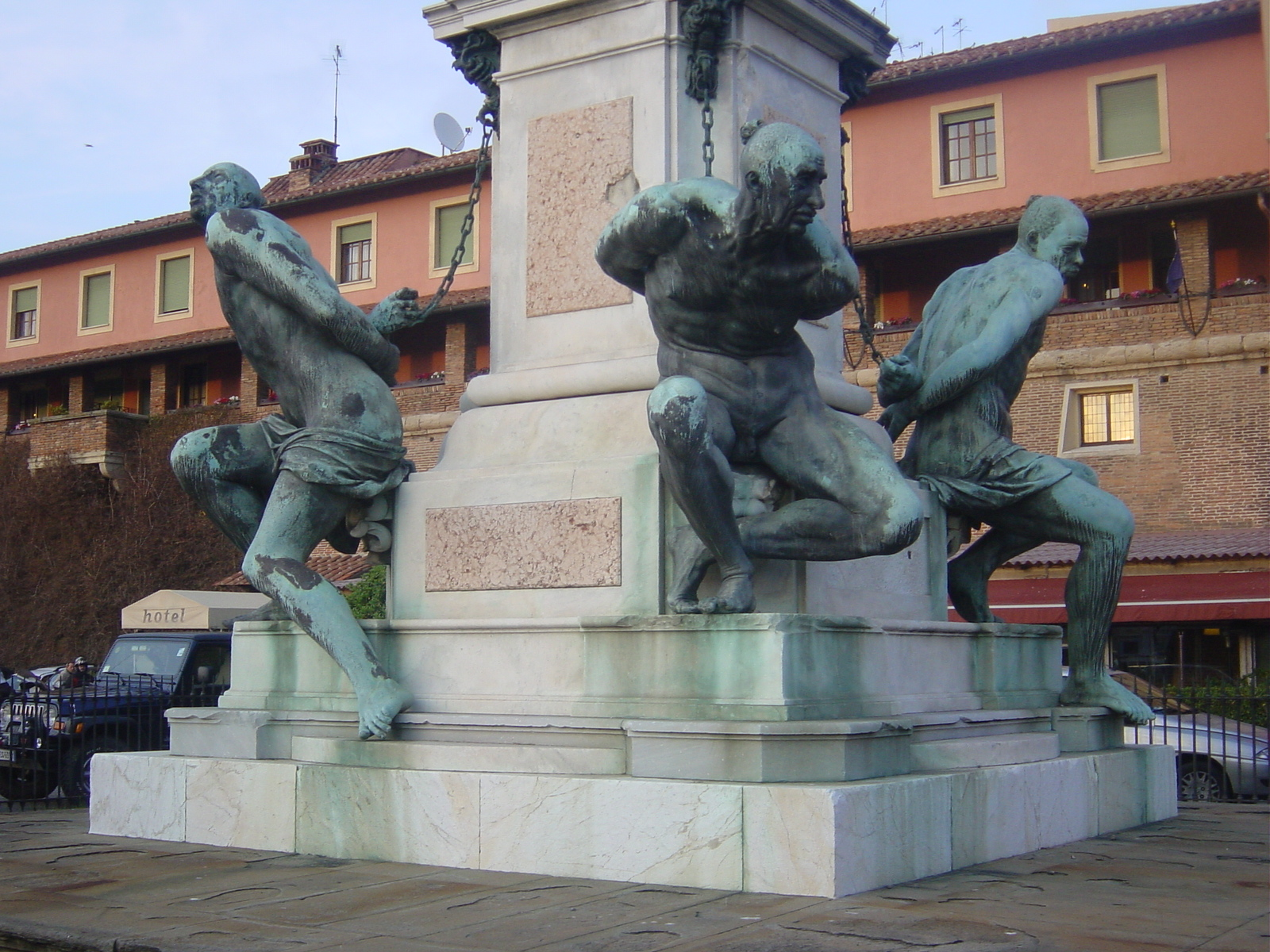
The Monument of the Four Moors by Pietro Tacca; Livorno, Italy

Barbary corsairs are protagonists in Le pantere di Algeri (the panthers of Algiers) by Emilio Salgari. They were featured in a number of other noted novels, including Robinson Crusoe by Daniel Defoe, The Count of Monte Cristo by Alexandre Dumas, père, The Wind in the Willows by Kenneth Grahame, The Sea Hawk and the Sword of Islam by Rafael Sabatini, The Algerine Captive by Royall Tyler, Master and Commander by Patrick O'Brian, the Baroque Cycle by Neal Stephenson, The Walking Drum by Louis Lamour, Doctor Dolittle by Hugh Lofting, Corsair by Clive Cussler, Tanar of Pellucidar by Edgar Rice Burroughs, and Angélique in Barbary by Anne Golon.

Miguel de Cervantes, the Spanish author, was captive for five years as a slave in the bagnio of Algiers, and reflected his experience in some of his fictional (but not directly autobiographical) writings, including the Captive's tale in Don Quixote, his two plays set in Algiers, El Trato de Argel (The Treaty of Algiers) and Los Baños de Argel (The Baths of Algiers), and episodes in a number of other works.

In Mozart's opera Die Entführung aus dem Serail (a Singspiel), two European ladies are discovered in a Turkish harem, presumably captured by Barbary corsairs. Rossini's opera L'italiana in Algeri is based on the capture of several slaves by Barbary corsairs led by the bey of Algiers.

== See also ==
- Albanian piracy
- Anglo-Turkish piracy
- Barbary slave trade
- Barbary treaties
- Circassian beauty
- Corsairs of Algiers
- Ghazi (warrior)
- History of slavery in the Muslim world
- Islamic views on slavery
- List of Ottoman conquests, sieges and landings
- Mathurin Romegas
- Morisco
- Morocco–United States relations
- Ottoman–Habsburg wars
- Ottoman Imperial Harem
- Ottoman Navy
- Piracy in Scotland
- Regency of Algiers
- Republic of Salé
- Slavery in the Ottoman Empire
- Thomas Pellow (1704–1745), who wrote an account of his enslavement
- Turkish Abductions
