= Capture of Manuel Briones =

Ecuadorian and Swedish altercation (1851 or 1852)

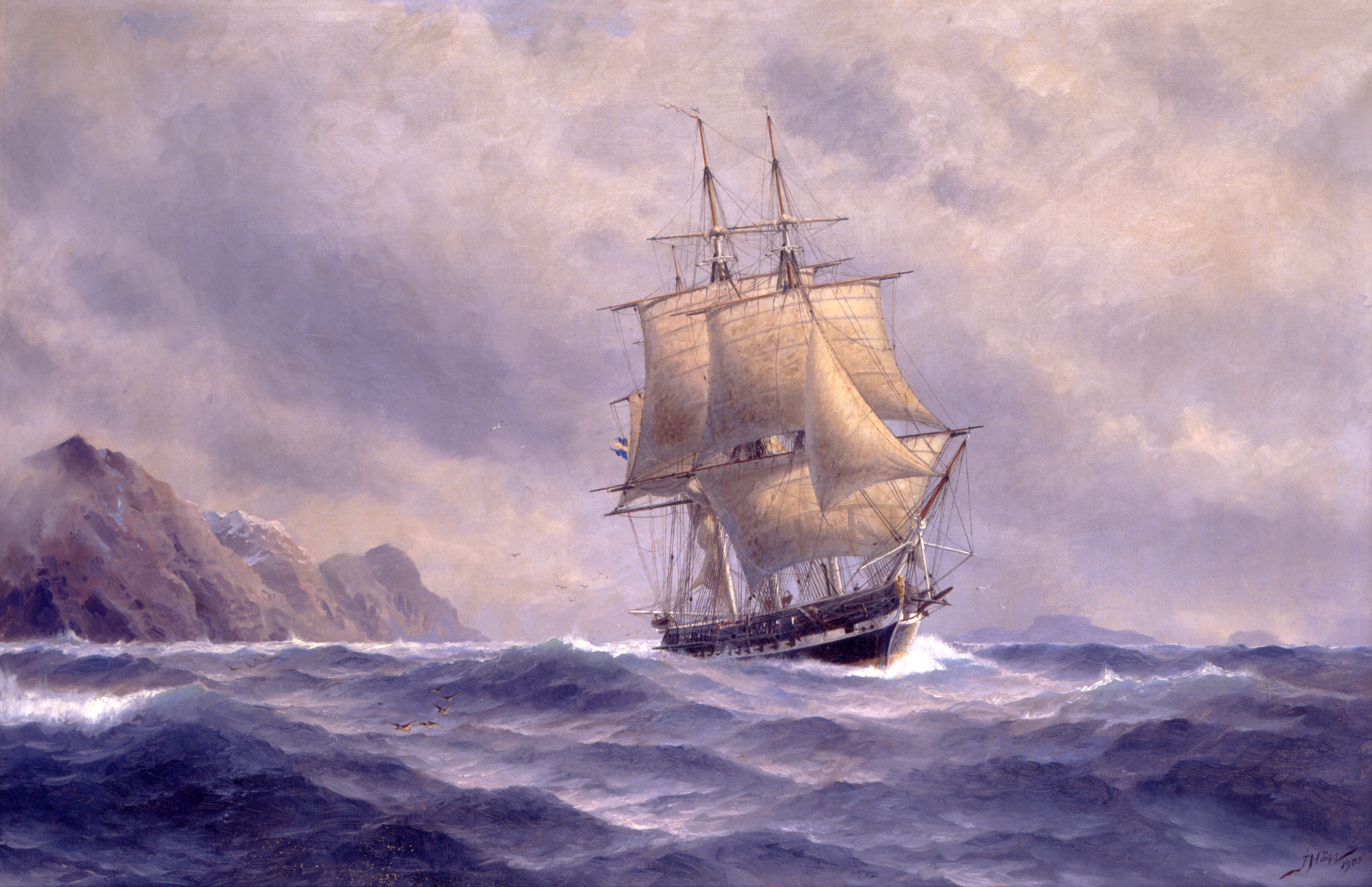
- A painting of HSwMS Eugenie by Jacob Hägg
Date	1851 or 1852
Location	Off the coast of Ecuador, Guayaquil
Result	Swedish-Ecuadorian victory

Belligerents
Sweden; Ecuador Expeditionary forces of Flores	Pirates

Commanders and leaders
(Sweden) Christian Adolf Virgin (Ecuador) Barroterán †	Manuel Briones (executed)

Units involved
HSwMS Eugenie	George Howland

Strength
Sweden: 1 frigate Ecuador: 1 detachment of soldiers 1 garrison Flores: Unknown	Unknown

Casualties and losses
At least 4 Ecuadorian soldiers executed	1 whaler and 1 smaller vessel captured 6 pirates executed (including Manuel Briones); Several prisoners freed

The capture of Manuel Briones was a brief altercation between Swedish and Ecuadorian authorities and the pirates of Manuel Briones who had set out to attack the upcoming Flores expedition.

== Background ==
The Flores expedition was set to be launched from Peru in 1851, to foment uprisings in Ecuador. Manuel Briones, a well-known criminal imprisoned with a number of his gang members on the small island of Floreana, was plotting to intercept the expedition. The island of Floreana only hosted five prison guards making escape easy for Briones and his gang, and they murdered most of them. Once free the bandits boarded and seized the American whaler George Howland as well as the crew without bloodshed.

== Altercation ==
Manuel Briones forced the American crew of the George Howland to set sail down the Ecuadorian coast, but before going to Guayaquil, it was decided to first gather supplies from the island of San Cristóbal. Present on the island was a small detachment of 5 Ecuadorian soldiers most likely under Lieutenant Barroterán and the island's governor, all of whom, as well as a considerable amount of money and supplies were taken onboard the ship. General Mena, a woman and four soldiers were captured. The woman would be raped by several of the bandits but was eventually allowed to leave, this is in sharp contrast to her male counterparts who were all killed and thrown overboard with the governor.

Setting out for Guayaquil, the bandits continued down the coast where almost immediately upon arrival, they encountered a couple of expeditionary vessels sent by Flores himself. The bandits wasted no time in murdering and capturing the crew, with only a few escaping. It was then that the Swedish frigate HSwMS Eugenie, which had just departed from Callao, became alerted of the rampaging pirates by a distressed sailor. The Swedes decided to take action and pursue the bandits. They stood little chance against the well-armed Swedish frigate and fled ashore after a short chase. The Swedes confiscated the stolen ships where they found an American named Peacock who had been hidden on the whaler for several days in fear of being found and murdered. An Ecuadorian detachment of soldiers would later find and imprison the pirates.

== Aftermath ==
The bandits would later be executed in Guayaquil in Ecuador, in front of an audience of locals and the Swedish crew. The frigate Eugenie would anchor at Guayaquil some time into the future, when Flores would finally conduct his expedition, the local Ecuadorians tried to ask for the Swedes to come to their aid. However, the crew had been instructed to be strictly neutral in any foreign affairs while out on their expedition so Captain Adolf Virgin chose to instead leave Guyaquil when the wind returned. Fortunately, Flores's attack on Guyaquil would not be as devastating as thought.

== See also ==
- First Barbary War
- Piracy
- HSwMS Eugenie
- Moroccan expedition (1843–45)
