= Moroccan expedition =

Joint Scandinavian military expedition to Morocco (1843–1845)

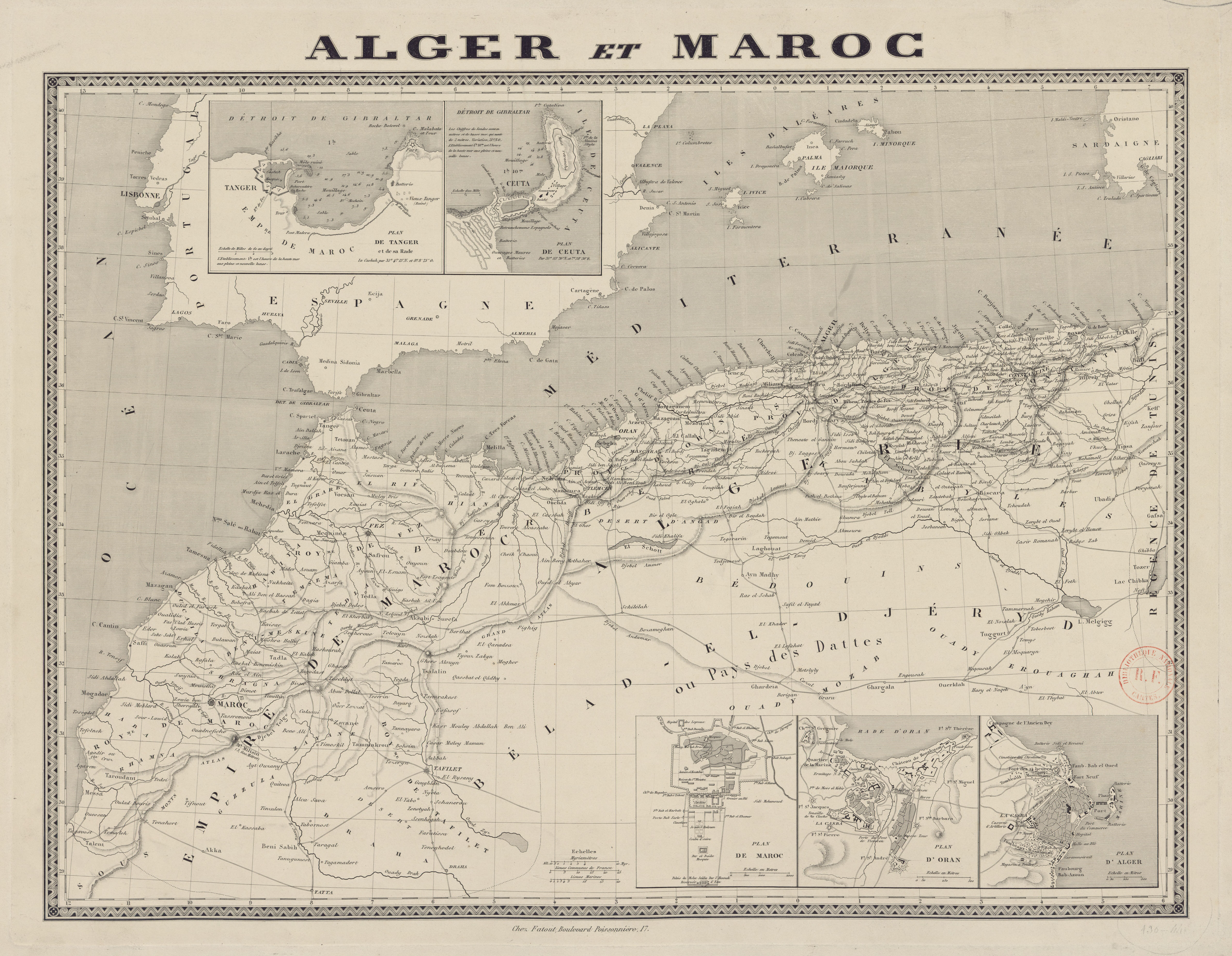
- Map of Morocco and Algiers, 1844
Date	1843–1845
Location	Morocco; Mediterranean; Gibraltar
Result	Coalition victory; Treaty of Larache

Belligerents
Denmark; Sweden-Norway: Sweden; Norway; Supported by: France; United Kingdom	Morocco: Barbary pirates

Commanders and leaders
Christian VIII; Captain Paludan; Captain Mourier; Oscar I C. H. Ulner; Mathias Ehrenoff	Abd al-Rahman; Buselham Ben-Ali

Strength
Denmark: 2 Frigates; 1 Brig; 1 Auxiliary vessel 1 Cutter brig 1 Corvette; Sweden: 2 Frigates; 1 Corvette; 1 Schooner; Norway: 1 Frigate; 1 Corvette	Unknown

The Moroccan expedition was a maritime expedition conducted by the nations of Sweden-Norway and Denmark to militarily pressure the Morocco into agreeing to the new stipulations as proposed by Danish and Swedish diplomats. One of the motives of the expedition was the reversal of several of the old and unfair treaties which stated that Sweden and Denmark would be required to pay an annual tribute to the Moroccan sultanate in order to be granted safe passage from the Barbary pirates.

In 1843 the Danish king Christian VIII proposed that the Danish and Swedish fleets should join forces to militarily pressure Morocco to relinquish their attacks on Swedish and Danish merchants without the payment of tribute. The following year, the fleets of Sweden, Denmark, and Norway jointly embarked on a military expedition to Morocco, and after a year of negotiations, the Moroccan Sultan Abd al-Rahman agreed to the new stipulations proposed by the Danish and Swedish negotiators.

== Background ==
Throughout the 1700s, the nations of Sweden and Denmark-Norway were forced to sign numerous unfair treaties with the Barbary pirates to ensure that their merchants would be able to travel through the Mediterranean without becoming the victim of a pirate attack. The Scandinavian nations were forced to pay hefty annual tributes to the numerous sultanates with the failure to pay this sum often being met by declarations of war or an increase in attacks against the merchants of that nation. Partly due to the distance between them, countries such as Denmark and Sweden did however often not have any other choice than to concede to the Barbary pirates' demands and would continue to pay and give luxury presents to the pirates. However, the start of the 19th century would see a great decline in the power and influence of said pirates. The Ottomans strengthening their control over Tripoli and the French invasion of Algiers in 1830 were all events that greatly weakened the pirates and the annual payment of tributes to the barbary states was, for the most part, a thing of the past by 1830. However, Sweden-Norway and Denmark were notable exceptions as they were still being extorted for money by Morocco and merchants from said countries would have to regularly be escorted by their respective navies. Despite the annual tribute, Moroccan pirates still attacked many Swedish-Norwegian merchantmen. Such was the case in 1840 when barbary attacks from Morocco, Algeria, and Tunis were so frequent that King Karl Johan of Sweden ordered a Swedish-Norwegian fleet to be dispatched to the area to protect the country's trade. However, Morocco was in a very weak state at this time, being the only remaining Barbary state and not having been able to keep up with the technological advancements of the European navies. The weakened state of Morocco was enough for Christian VIII to, in 1843, deploy the Danish navy to travel down to Morocco to pressure Abd al-Rahman of Morocco to end their collection of Danish tributes in a show of force.

== Departure to Morocco ==
=== Danish flotilla ===
In 1843, the Danish corvette Flora, under Captain Paludan, received a secret order to travel down to Morocco with a small fleet in an attempt to end the annual tribute to the sultan. The flotilla was later joined by the brig Set Croix from the Caribbean the same year and also by the frigates Geifon, under HGF Garde, and Thelis under H. Aschehoug in 1844. Also present was the cutter brig Merkurius.

However, negotiations with Abd al-Rahman of Morocco remained at a standstill. This forced Christian VIII to ask the Swedes for their aid in their expedition in 1843. Sweden-Norway was also being extorted for money by the Barbary pirates and was therefore willing to contribute to the military pressure put upon Morocco to end their own annual payment of tributes. In the of spring 1844, after his accession to the Swedish and Norwegian thrones, King Oscar I agreed to dispatch the Swedish Navy to aid Denmark in their expedition. The decision to join the expedition was made partly do reports from Swedish-Norwegian consul Ehrenoff that the Moroccans had mobilized a Brigg and a schooner. The Swedish feared that these vessels would be used against Swedish merchants and thus took action to prevent this.

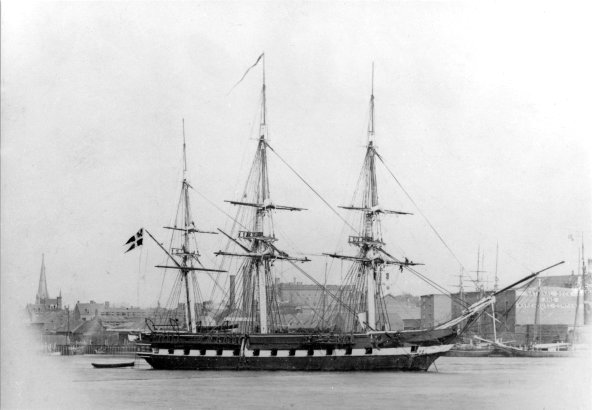
The Swedish frigate HSwMS Josephine

=== Swedish-Norwegian flottila ===
On 2 September 1844, the corvette Carlskrona, the schooner l'Aigle, and the frigate Josephine set sail from Sweden under C.H Ulner to the Mediterranean. Josephine was the flottilla's flagship, being the largest of the deployed warships, with a 700-strong crew and around 70 cannons. The corvette Carlskrona under Gustaf Ruuth had a crew of 130 and was the second largest ship dispatched, with the l'Aigle being the smallest. The corvette Nordstiernan would be deployed from the Norwegian Navy, though it was under the command of C.H Ulner onboard the Josephine. The Norwegian navy would also contribute to the expedition with the frigate Freja.

=== Journey to Gibraltar ===
Around the time that the Swedish-Norwegian fleet was about to set sail, the Moroccan government announced that they were willing to negotiate an end to the collection of tribute from the European powers, with the exception of Sweden-Norway, Denmark, and France.

On 3 September, the Swedish flotilla arrived in Copenhagen where they received Danish pilots from the local Swedish consulate before continuing up through Kattegat on the 5th along with the Danish steamship Hekla under Captain Mourier after a short stay. After traveling up the Swedish west coast, they again anchored at Elfsborgs fortress where they would take the giraffe Hadgi onboard to take him home to Egypt. Hadgi had been a present from the Egyptian pasha to Oscar I after his accession to the throne in March, however, the giraffe would die before making it to Egypt.

On the 15th, the flotilla left Elfsborg to resume its journey leaving Kattegat, along with the Danish pilots, behind. The next day, the fleet entered the North Sea during a hefty storm and would spend the night in Ramsgate, England.

On the 27th, the Swedes entered the Bay of Biscay. While passing by the southern tip of Portugal, a tired dove landed on the Carlskrona's rudder which would inspire the corvette's doctor, Herman Sätherberg, to write a short poem named "Den lilla tuturduvan i spanskasjön" (The little singing dove in the bay of Biscay), and he would become quite popular back at home as a poet and a writer upon returning.

The flotilla would enter the Mediterranean the next day on the 28th, they would sail by Tanger where they would be met by raised flags by the local Portuguese and British consulates before anchoring. The Swedes were welcomed by the British garrison and invited onboard HMS Albion after a salute from the Swedes.

== Stay at Gibraltar ==
Upon arrival, the Swedes met up with the Danish navy and the Norwegian corvette Nordenstiernan, and the situation regarding Morocco was discussed on the Danish Merkurius where the Danes informed the Swedes of the diplomatic standstill with the Moroccan sultan. C. H. Ulner, Gustaf Ruuth, and the Swedish-Norwegian general consul Ehrenoff would represent Sweden-Norway in the negotiations with Abd al-Rahman. The General consul Carstensen was the representative for Denmark, and Fredrick Crusenstolpe would be the translator between the Scandinavians and Abd al-Rahman. The negotiations took place on the frigate Josephine which had anchored outside Tanger. The French and the British had provided their diplomatic support to the Scandinavians, and the French had recently started a war with Morocco which strengthened the positions of the Scandinavian powers diplomatically.

In July 1844, Sweden-Norway would adopt new flags. The Swedish-Norwegian fleet in Gibraltar thus received orders to raise the new flags. Since the fleet only had the old Swedish and Norwegian flags in possession, they had to manually stitch the newly introduced union mark into the top left corner of respective country's flag. This was the first time that the new flags were raised on a naval vessel.

While the negotiations would drag on, the crew of the Scandinavian navies would dedicate their time to festivities and exploring Gibraltar. The day after Christmas, the Swedes would invite their Danish, Norwegian, and even British counterparts to take part in a traditional Swedish 'Annandag' celebration. The festivities continued on New Year's Eve where the Swedish, Norwegian, and Danish sailors would sing their respective national anthems during heavy rain as the clock turned 12.

From January 1845, the location of where the negotiations took place changed to the sultan's palace. Negotiations reached a breakthrough in April in Larache where the sultan finally agreed to the Swedish/Norwegian and Danish demands to end the annual tribute, borrowing one last payment of 133 532 riksdaler from Sweden-Norway. However, until the treaty would become ratified, the fleets of Denmark and Sweden-Norway would continue to guard Swedish-Norwegian trade flowing through the area from any attacks from Morocco. Eventually the HMS Josephine would return home and was then replaced by the frigate HMS Eugenie which continued to guard the Swedish-Norwegian trade.

== Aftermath ==
1845 would mark the last time either Sweden-Norway or Denmark would pay tribute to the Barbary pirates, and they were the last in Europe to do so. The Treaty of Larache would be signed by Ehrenoff and C. H. Ulner on the Swedish side and Buselham Ben-Ali on the Moroccan, the treaty would be ratified in Stockholm upon Ehrenoff's arrival. Both Ehrenoff and C. H. Ulner would receive the Order of the Polar Star and the Order of the Dannebrog for their actions during the expedition.

The corvette Carlskrona would cease guarding Swedish-Norwegian trade and received orders to conduct a new voyage towards Saint Barthelemy in July after the treaty was ratified. However, she capsized, leading to 114 deaths which was the biggest Swedish maritime disaster in peace-time.

== See also ==
- Capture of Manuel Briones
- Capture of the sloop Anne
