= HSwMS Eugenie =

Swedish frigate

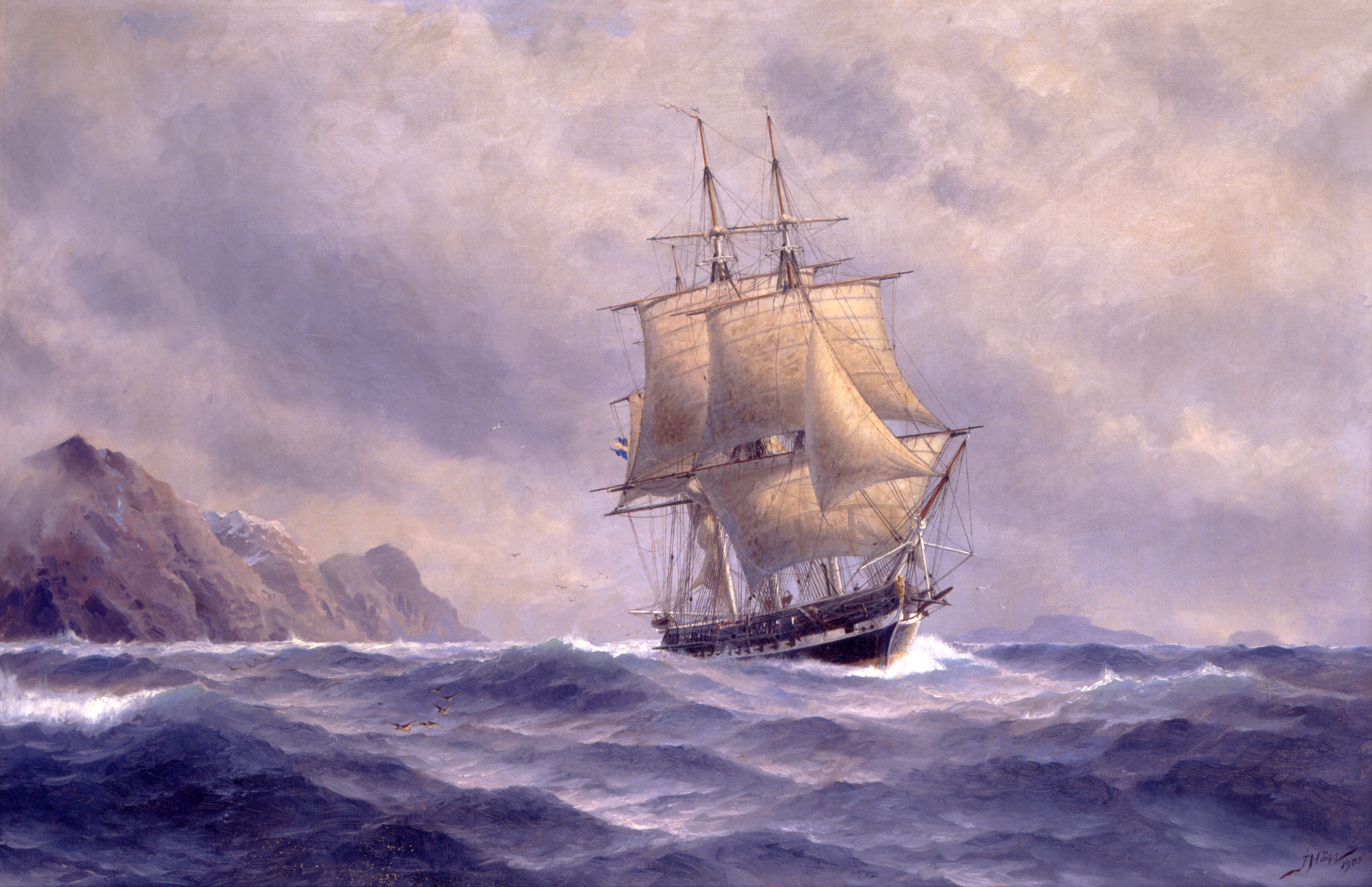
- Painting of HSwMS Eugenie by Jacob Hägg.

History

Sweden
- Name: Eugenie
- Builder: Karlskrona shipyard
- Launched: December 9, 1844
- Commissioned: 1846
- Out of service: May 8, 1888
- Fate: Sold in 1919, scrapped in 1926

General characteristics
- Class & type: Frigate
- Displacement: 1,360 tons
- Length: 46.69 m (153.2 ft)
- Beam: 12.37 m (40.6 ft)
- Draught: 5.49 ft (1.67 m)

HSwMS Eugenie was a Swedish frigate, armed with 40 cannons. Between 1851 and 1853, the Eugenie was captained by Christian Adolf Virgin as the first Swedish warship to circumnavigate the globe, on a voyage intended to promote Swedish trade. Naval officer Carl Skogman subsequently released an itinerary of the journey.

The vessel was classified as a corvette from 1877 until 1888, when it was converted into an accommodation ship at Skeppsholmen. She was taken out of service completely in 1919 and was sold to a Norwegian shipping company in Moss to be used as a floating residence for workers. In 1926, she was sold to a scrap dealer in Halmstad for scrapping.

The ship is named after Princess Eugenie, daughter of Oscar I of Sweden.

== Circumnavigating the globe (1851–1853) ==
This trip was the first global circumnavigation ever made with a Swedish warship. The first Swedish circumnavigation of the globe was probably carried out by the small brigantine, the Mary Ann under the command of captain Nils Werngren who performed an unplanned circumnavigation between 1839 and 1841.

On September 30, 1851, the ship set sail from Karlskrona, Sweden.

Itinerary of the journey:

1. Sweden
2. Portsmouth, England
3. Funchal, Madeira, Portugal
4. Rio de Janeiro, Brazil
5. Montevideo, Uruguay
6. Buenos Aires, Argentina
7. Colonia, Uruguay
8. Port Famine, Strait of Magellan, Argentina
9. Valparaíso, Chile
10. Callao, Peru
11. Puna, Peru
12. Panama
13. Galapagos Islands, Ecuador
14. Honolulu, Hawaii, United States
15. San Francisco, United States
16. Honolulu, Hawaii, United States
17. Tahiti, French Polynesia
18. Sydney, Australia
19. Pouynypet, Caroline Islands
20. Guam
21. Hong Kong
22. Canton, China
23. Manila, Philippines
24. Singapore
25. Batavia, Dutch East Indies
26. Cocos Islands, Australia
27. Mauritius
28. Cape Town, Cape Colony
29. St Helena
30. Plymouth, England
31. Cherbourg, France
32. Sweden

== See also ==
- Capture of Manuel Briones
