= Piracy in Scotland =

Piracy in Scotland dates back to the presence of Viking pirates in Scotland in 617. The main difference between pirates and privateers is that privateers were given a permit by their sovereign country, which pardoned them from all legal actions taken against pirates. These government-issued permits were called Letters of Marque.

== History ==
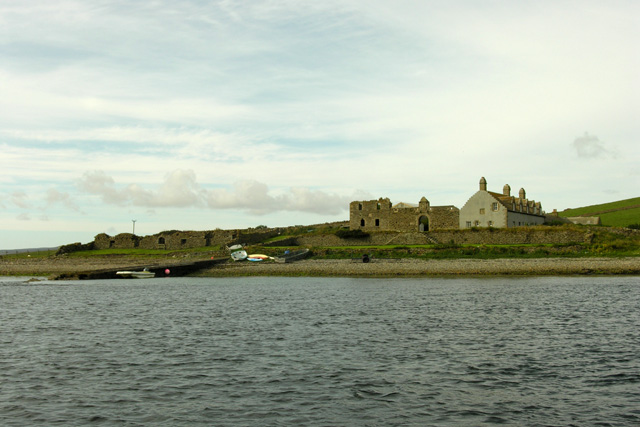
The Langskaill House was used by Sweyn Asleifsson during his days of piracy in Scotland.

The Viking Sweyn Asleifsson was born in 1115 in Caithness and later lived in the Orkney Islands. From this home base he raided the British Isles around 1150. Around 1549, pirates resided on the islands of Pabay and Longay. The MacNeils of Barra frequently engaged in piracy to financially provide for the clan. The most famous was Ruari Og MacNeil. He particularly targeted English ships, leading Queen Elizabeth I to urge King James VI to seize his lands. Another famous pirate from Scotland was Thorbjorn Thornsteinsson.

== Effects ==
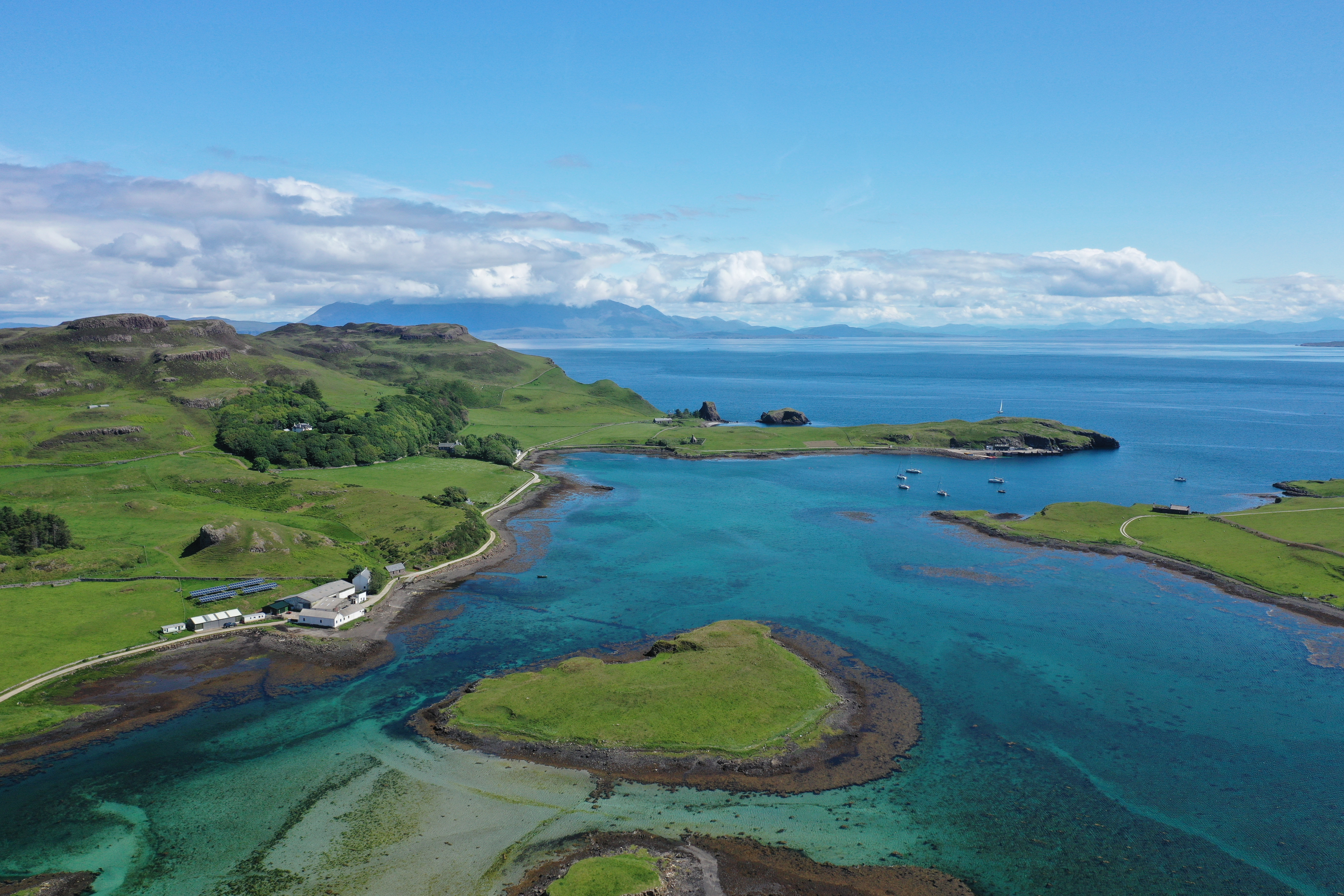
Aerial view of the islands of Canna, a hub for piracy in the 15th century.

King James I became king of Scotland in 1424 after being kidnapped by pirates and sold to King Henry IV of England nineteen years earlier. Piracy presented security and economic problems to west Scotland, especially on the islands of Canna.
