= Treaty of Larache =

- Signed: April 5, 1845
- Location: Larache, Morocco
- Ratified: May, 1845
- Negotiators: Mathias Ehrenoff; Carl Ulner (Denmark) Carstensen; Buselham Ben-Ali; Abd al-Rahman
- Signatories: Mathias Ehrenoff; Carl Ulner; Buselham ben-ali
- Parties: Sweden-Norway; Denmark Morocco

The Treaty of Larache was a treaty between Sweden-Norway, Denmark and Morocco as a result of the Moroccan expedition (1843-45). The expedition was conducted by the combined navies of Sweden-Norway and Denmark to pressure the Moroccan sultanate into agreeing to the reversal of several old unfair treaties and to put a halt to the annual payment of tribute to Morocco in exchange for safe passage through the Mediterranean. After months of negotiations, the Moroccan sultan, Abd al-Rahman, eventually caved under the pressure from the allied powers in April 1845 in Larache as Morocco was very weak at this time due to them simultaneously fighting in the Franco-Moroccan War. The treaty was later ratified in Stockholm in May.

== Stipulations ==
- Sweden-Norway pays a final sum of 133 532 riksdalers to Morocco.
- The payment of an annual tribute to Morocco for safe passage seizes without any repercussions from the sultanate.
- Morocco does not receive any payments or gifts previously promised by Sweden-Norway and Denmark including 56,000 piasters.

== See also ==
- Moroccan expedition (1843-45)
