= List of battles and sieges involving Norway =

This is a list of battles and sieges involving Norway.

== Pre-Unification Viking Age (793–872) ==
- Halfdan the Mild's revolt (ca. 813)
- Battle of 839 (839)
- Siege of Paris (845)
- Viking raid on Nekor (ca. 859)
- Battle of York (867)
- Siege of Dumbarton (870)
- Battle of Basing (871)
- Battle of Meretun (871)

== Unification of Norway (860-872) ==
- Battle of Hakadal (ca. 860)
- Battle of Orkdal (ca. 870)
- First battle of Solskjel (ca. 870)
- Second battle of Solskjel (ca. 870)
- Battle of Fjaler (ca. 870)
- Harald Fairhair's campaign in Götaland (870s)
- Battle of Hafrsfjord (ca. 872)

== 872–1030 ==
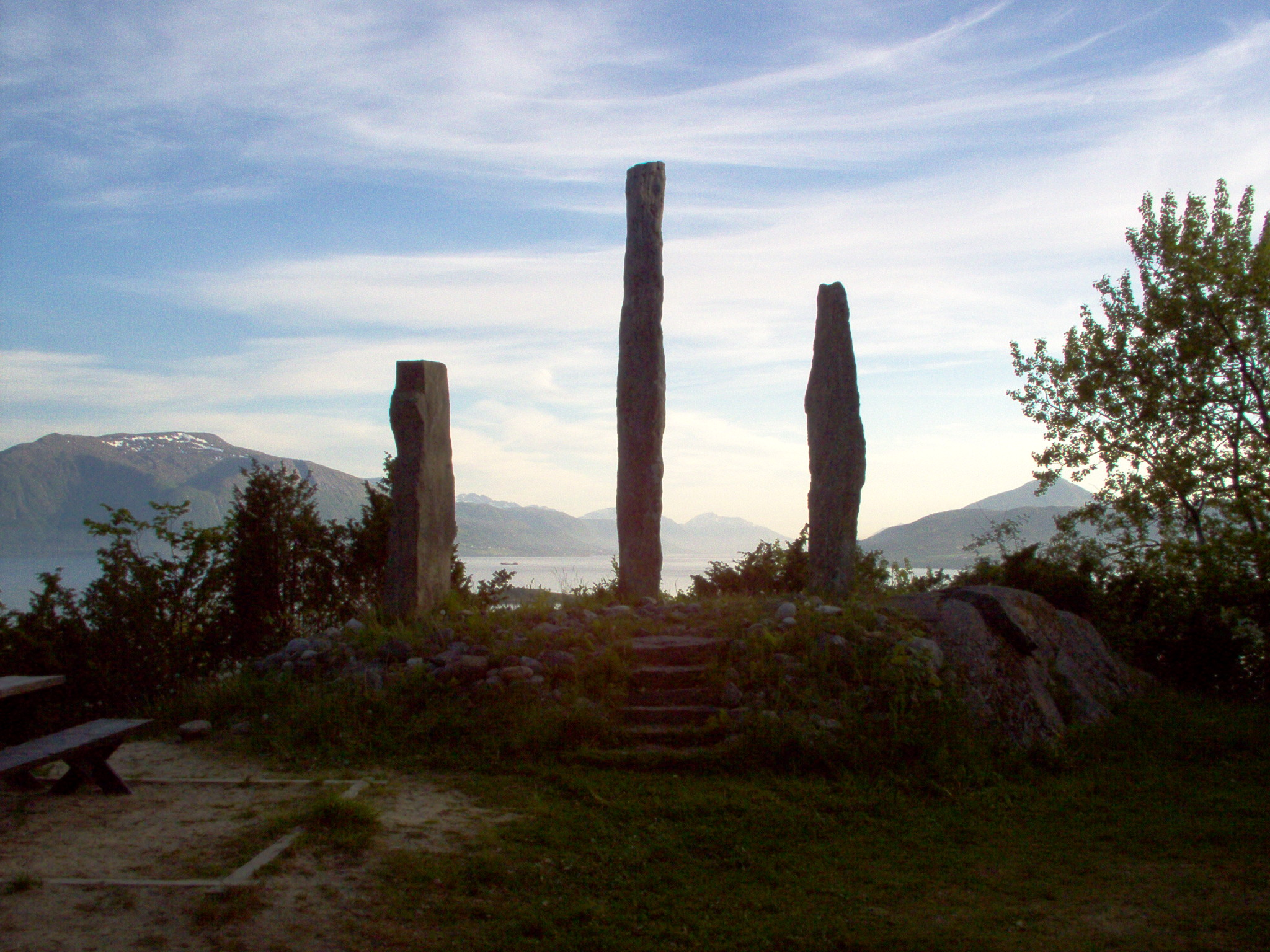
Obelisk Memorial for Egil Ullserk and his men who died at the Battle of Rastarkalv

- Battle of Chippenham (878)
- Battle of Stamford (878)
- Battle of Corbridge (918)
- Battle of Brunanburh (937)
- Battle of Blodeheia (953)
- Battle of Rastarkalv (955)
- Battle of Fitjar (961)
- Battle of Hjörungavágr (ca. 985)
- Battle of Maldon (991)
- Battle of Svolder (1000)
- Battle of Thetford (1004)
- Battle of Ringmere (1010)
- Battle of Nesjar (1016)
- Battle of Helgeå (1026)
- Battle of Boknafjorden (1028)
- Battle of Stiklestad (1030)

== The claim to Denmark (1040–1064) ==
- Battle of Lyrskov Heath (1043)
- Battle of Rügen (1043)
- Battle of Aarhus (1043)
- Battle of Niså (1062)

== The British Isles (1066–1103) ==
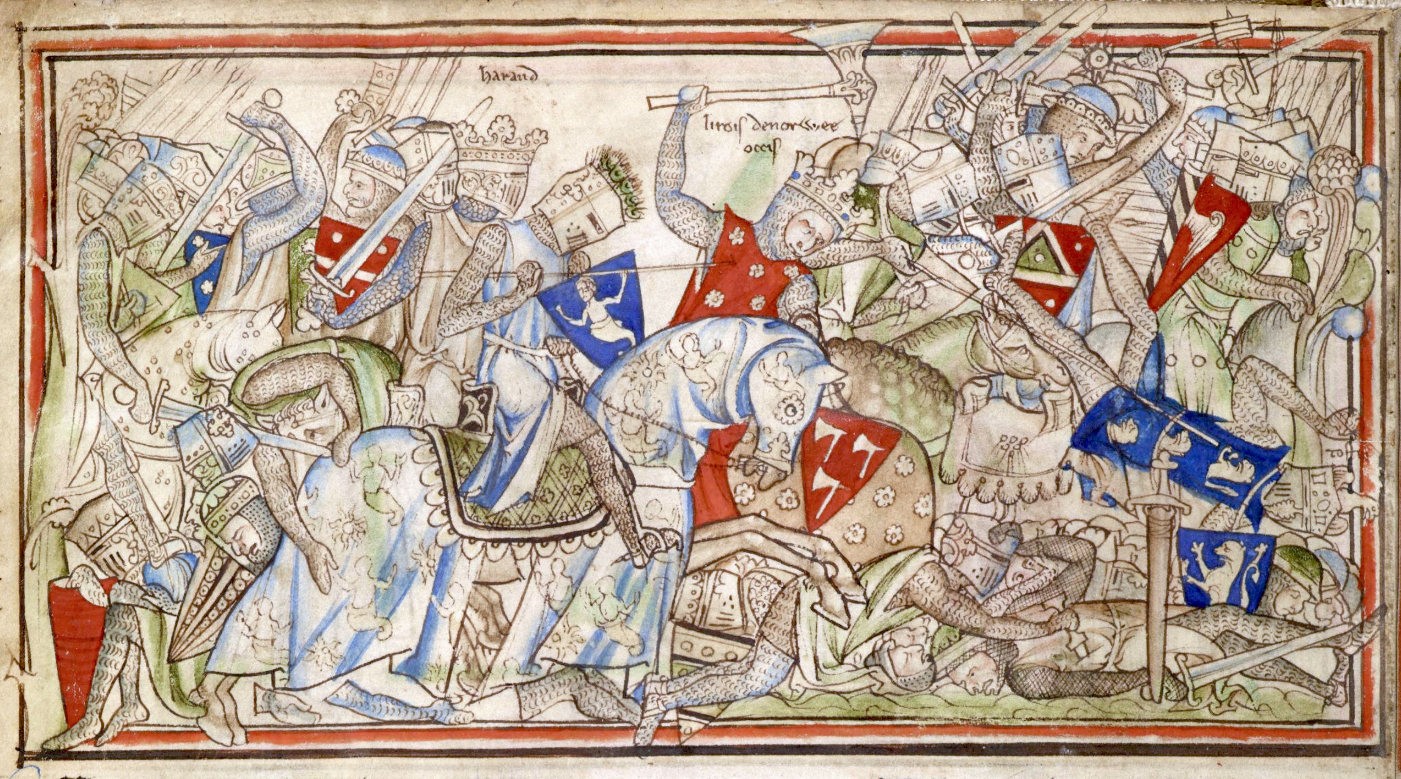
Battle of Stamford Bridge

- Norwegian invasion of England (1066)
  - Battle of Fulford (1066)
  - Battle of Stamford Bridge (1066)
- Magnus Barefoot's First Irish Sea campaign (1098–1099)
  - Battle of Anglesey Sound (1098)

== Crusades (1107–1123) ==
- Norwegian Crusade (1107–1111), in the aftermath of the First Crusade
  - Raid on Santiago de Compostela (1109)
  - Raid on Sintra (1109)
  - Siege of Lisbon (1109)
  - Sack of Alkasse (1109)
  - Battle of Gibraltar (1109)
  - Battle of Formentera (1109)
  - Battle of Menorca (1109)
  - Raid on the Balearic Islands (1109)
  - Siege of Sidon (1110)
- Kalmare ledung (1123)

== Civil war era (1130–1240) ==
- Battle of Fyrileiv (1134)
- Battle of Bergen (1135)
- Battle of Minne (1137)
- Battle of Holmengrå (1139)
- Battle of Hising (1161)
- Battle of Oslo (1161)
- Battle of Sekken (1162)
- Battle of Re (1163)
- Battle of Djurså (1165)
- Battle of Re (1177)
- Conquest of Jemtland
  - Battle of Storsjön (1178)
- Battle of Kalvskinnet (1179)
- Battle of Ilevollene (1180)
- Battle of Fimreite (1184)
- Battle of Florvåg (1194)
- Battle of Tunsberg (ca. 1200)
- Battle of Oslo (1218)
- Battle of bergen (1237)
- Siege of Rothesay Castle (1230) 1230
- Battle of Oslo (1239)

== The Golden Age (1240-1319) ==
- Scottish–Norwegian War (1262–66)
  - Battle of Largs (1263)
  - Siege of Rothesay Castle (1263) (1263)
- War of the Outlaws (1289-1296)
  - Siege of Copenhagen (1289)
  - Battle of Skanör (1289)
- Second Swedish brothers feud (1304–1310)
  - Battle of Oslo (1308)
  - Battle of Dalaland (1308)
  - Battle of Kalvsund (1309)

== House of Bjälbo (1319–1387) ==
- First Norwegian Noble Rising
  - Siege of Tunsberg (1332) (1332)
- Kalundborg War
  - Siege of Kalundborg (1341)
- War against Albert of Mecklenberg
  - Battle of Gataskogen (1365)
  - Siege of Stockholm (1371)

== Kalmar Union (1389/1397–1523) ==
- Vitalian Brotherhood
  - Sacking of Bergen (1393)
- Conflict with Novgorod
  - Raid on the White Sea (1419)
- Conflict with the Hanseatic League (Schleswig War) (1426–1435)
  - Battle of Bergen (1428)
  - Battle of Bergen (1429)
- Conflict with Novgorod
  - Raid on the White Sea (1449)
- Conflict with Sweden
  - Assault on Karlsborg (1456)

== Denmark–Norway (1523/1537–1807) ==
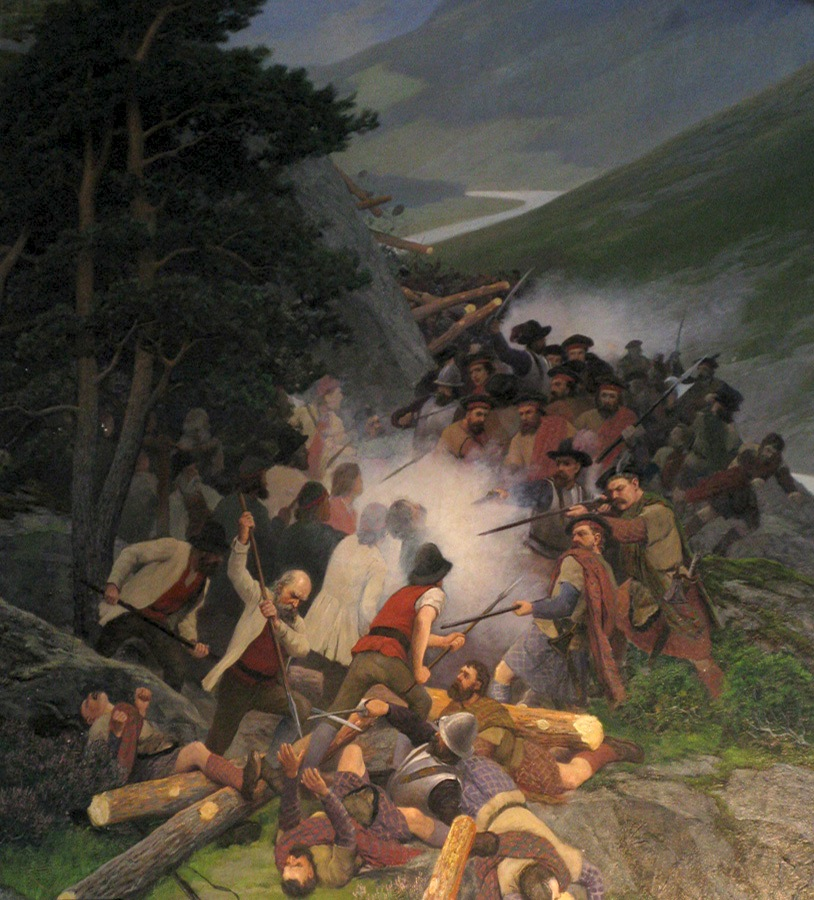
Battle of Kringen

- Olav Engelbrektssons rebellion (1536-1537)
  - Siege of Steinvikholm Castle (1537)
  - Siege of Hamar (1537)
- Kalmar War (1611–13)
  - Battle of Kringen (1612)
- Hannibal controversy (1643–45)
  - Battle of Bysjön (1644)
  - Battle of Frösöen (1644)
  - Battle of Vänersborg (1644)
  - Battle of Vänersborg (1645)
- Dano-Swedish Wars (1657–58, 1658–60)
  - Battle of Frösöen (1657)
  - Battle of Eda (1658)
  - Battle of Trondheim (1658)
  - Battle of Halden (1658–60)
  - Battle of Borge (1660)
- Second Anglo-Dutch War (1665–67)
  - Battle of Vågen (1665)
- Scanian War (1675–79)
  - Battle of Oviken (1677)
  - Battle of Vänersborg (1677)
  - Battle of Marstrand (1677)
  - Battle of Køge Bay (1677)
  - Battle of Ålen (1679)
- Danish-Dutch conflict over Greenland (1739)
  - Battle of Jakobshavn (1739)
- Great Northern War (1700–21)
  - Battle of Køge Bay (1710)
  - Battle of Høland (1716)
  - Battle of Fredriksten (1716)
  - Battle of Dynekilen (1716)
  - Battle of Moss (1716)
  - Battle of Nordkleiva (1716)
  - Battle of Norderhov (1716)
  - Battle of Harestuskogen (1716)
  - Siege of Fredriksten (1718)
- Theatre War (1788-1789)
  - Battle of Kvistrum (1788)
- French Revolutionary Wars (1792-1802)
  - Battle of Copenhagen (1801)

== Napoleonic Wars (1807–1814) ==
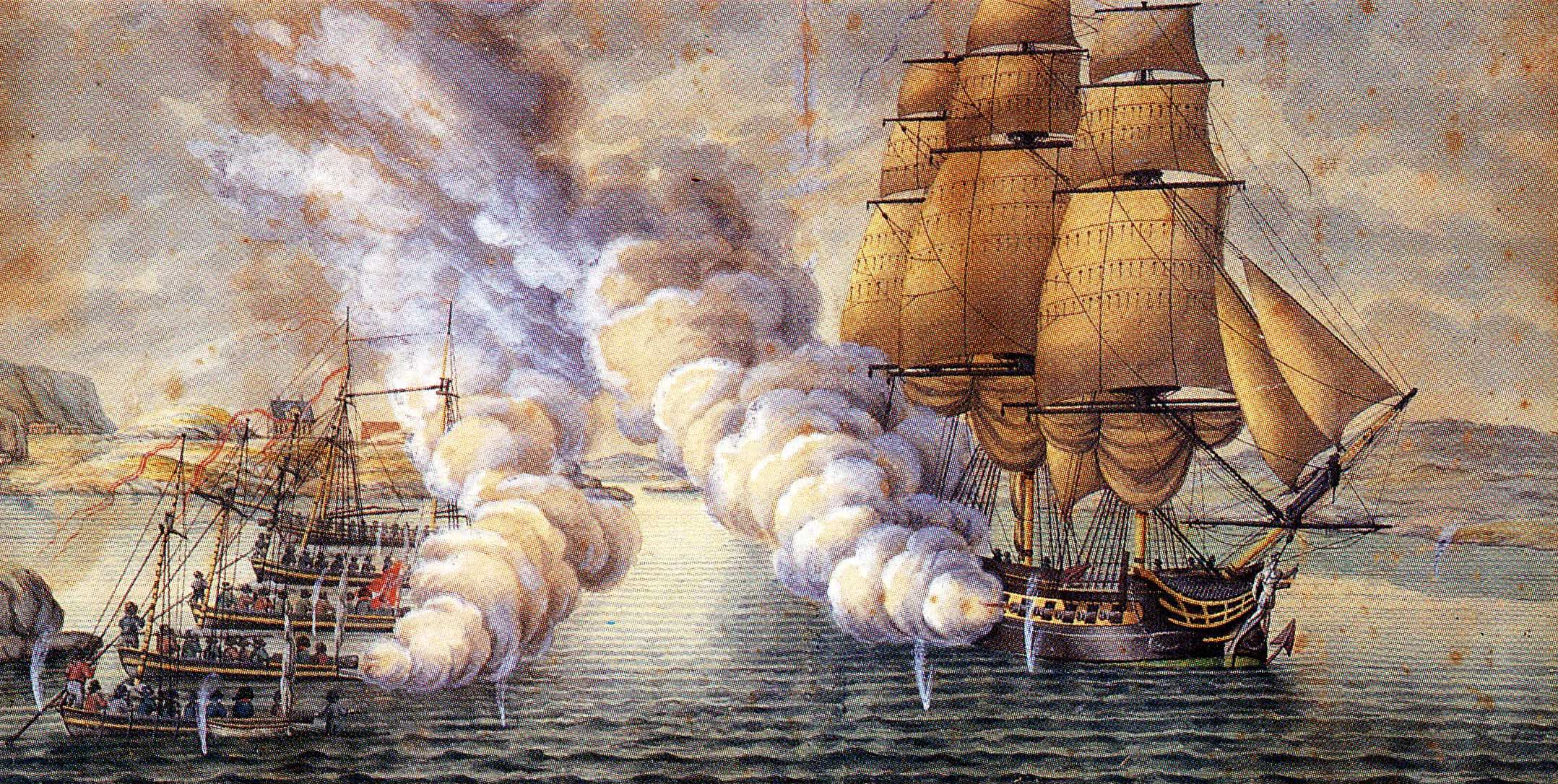
HMS Tartar attacked by Dano-Norwegian gunboats in the Battle of Alvøen

- Gunboat War (1807–14)
  - Battle of Copenhagen (1807)
  - Battle of Kristiansund (1808)
  - Battle of Alvøen (1808)
  - Battle of Lista (1808)
  - Battle of Lyngør (1808)
  - Battle of Kragerø (1808)
  - Battle of Kjerringvik (1808)
  - Battle of Hammerfest (1809)
  - Battle of Silda (1810)
  - Battle of Anholt (1811)
  - Battle of Grimstad Bay (1811)
  - Battle of Tromsø (1812)
  - Battle of Lyngør (1812)
- Dano-Swedish War (1808–1809)
  - Battle of Lier (1808)
  - Battle of Toverud (1808)
  - Battle of Rødenes (1808)
  - Battle of Trangen (1808)
  - Battle of Furuholm (1808)
  - Battle of Mobekk (1808)
  - Battle of Prestebakke (1808)
  - Battle of Berby (1808)
  - Jämtland Campaigns of (1808–1809)
- Swedish–Norwegian War (1814)
  - Battle of Tistedalen (1814)
  - Battle of Lier (1814)
  - Siege of Fredrikstad (1814)
  - Battle of Matrand (1814)
  - Battle of Rakkestad (1814)
  - Battle of Langnes (1814)
  - Battle of Kjølberg Bridge (1814)

== World War II (1940–1945) ==
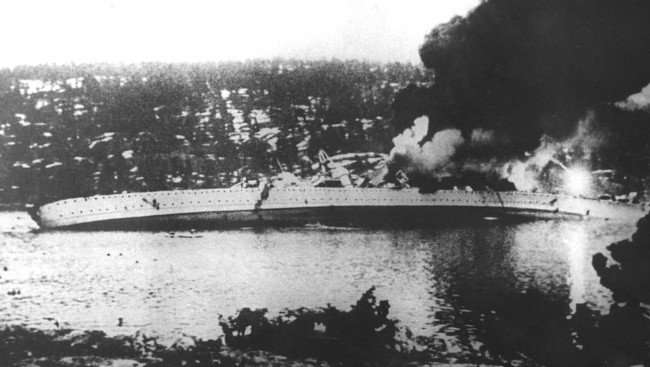
Blücher sinking in the Oslofjord

- Invasion of Norway (1940)
  - Battle of Drøbak Sound (1940)
  - Battle of Midtskogen (1940)
  - Battle of Dombås (1940)
  - Åndalsnes landings (1940)
  - Namsos Campaign (1940)
  - Battle of Vinjesvingen (1940)
  - Battle of Hegra Fortress (1940)
  - Battles of Narvik (1940)
    - Battle of Gratangen (1940)
  - Operation Juno (1940)
- Pacific War
  - German attacks on Nauru (1940)

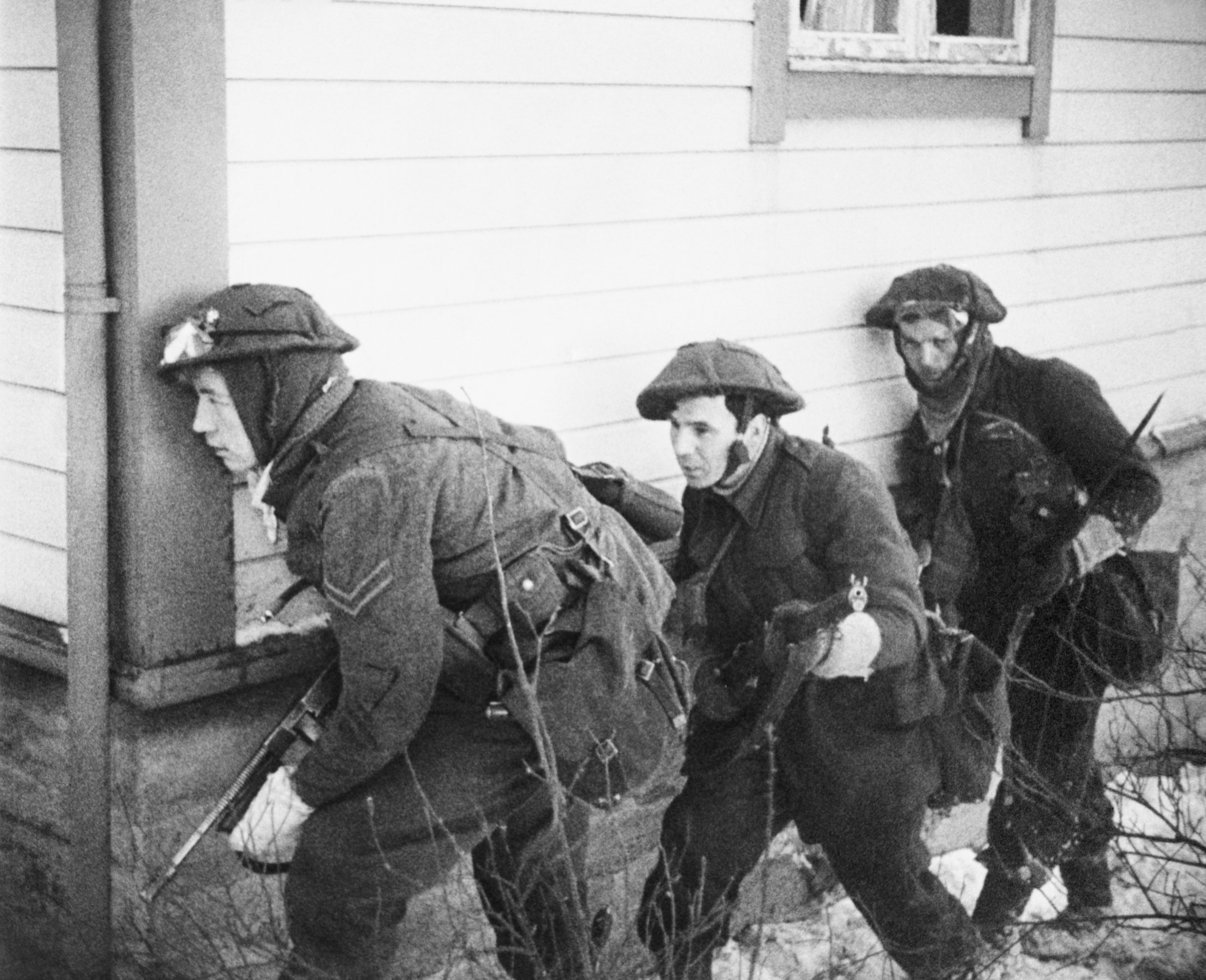
Commandos in action during the Måløy-raid

- Continuing the war in exile
  - Operation Gauntlet (1941)
  - Operation Kitbag (1941)
  - Operation Anklet (1941)
  - Operation Archery, aka Måløy raid (1941)
  - Operation Musketoon (1942)
  - Operation Fritham (1942–1943)
  - Operation Cartoon (1943)
  - Operation Zitronella (1943)
- Battle of the Atlantic (1940–1945)
  - Battle of the North Cape (1943)
- Western Front
  - Invasion of Normandy (1944)
    - Normandy landings (1944)
  - Battle of the Scheldt (1944)
- The end of the war in Norway
  - Petsamo–Kirkenes Offensive (1944)
  - Black Friday (1945)

== United Nations Interim Force in Lebanon (1978–1998) ==
- Lebanese Civil War (1978-1990)
  - Battle of Kaukaba (1978)

== Balkans ==
  - Bosnian war
  - Kosovo war
  - Operation Allied Force
  - Operation Joint Guardian
  - Incident at Pristina airport
  - 2001 Macedonia conflict
  - Operation Essential Harvest
  - Stabilisation Force in Bosnia and Herzegovina

== Kashmir ==
  - 1995 Kidnapping of western tourists in Kashmir

== War on terror (2001–2021) ==
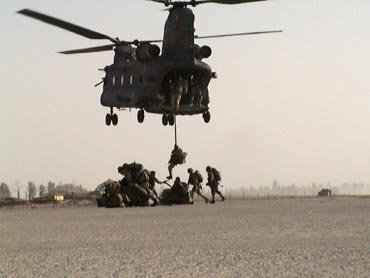
Norwegian special forces soldiers (FSK) unload from a MH-47 Chinook during Operation Anaconda

- War in Afghanistan (2001-2021)
  - Operation Anaconda (2002)
  - Operation Jacana (2002)
  - Operation Mongoose (2003)
  - Operation Pickaxe-Handle (2007)
  - Operation Harekate Yolo (2007)
  - Operation Karez (2008)
  - Counterinsurgency in Northern Afghanistan (2009–2014)
  - Task Force K-Bar
  - Operation Enduring Freedom
  - Uzbin Valley ambush
  - Release of hostage Christina Meier
  - April 2012 Afghanistan attacks
  - Hostage incident at Qargha Reservoir / Lake Qara june 2012
  - May 2020 Afghanistan attacks
  - Resolute Support Mission
  - Destruction of Syria's chemical weapons
  - Operation Active Endeavour
  - 2015 Park Palace guesthouse attack
  - Hostage situation at Hetal Hotel, Kabul May 2015
  - 2018 Inter-Continental Hotel Kabul attack
  - American University of Afghanistan attack
  - Operation Atalanta
  - Operation Ocean Shield

== Arab Spring (2010–2012) ==
- Libyan Civil War (2011)
  - 2011 military intervention in Libya
    - Operation Odyssey Dawn (2011)
    - Operation Unified Protector (2011)

== Houthi-led attacks on shipping in the Red Sea ==
  - Operation Prosperity Guardian

== Russo-Ukrainian War (2022- ==
- Coalition of the willing (Russo-Ukrainian War)
- Operation Interflex

== Sources ==
- Norsk forsvarshistorie Bind 1, Geir Atle Ersland and Terje Holm, Eide Forlag (Norway)
