= HMS Tickler (1808) =

Cutter of the Royal Navy

History

Great Britain
- Name: Lord Duncan
- Namesake: Adam Duncan, 1st Viscount Duncan
- Launched: 1798, Dover
- Fate: Sold 1808

United Kingdom
- Name: HMS Tickler
- Acquired: 1808 by purchase
- Fate: Sold 25 or 28 August 1816

General characteristics
- Tons burthen: 114, or 11416/94, or 116 (bm)
- Length: Overall: 62 ft 6 in (19.1 m); Keel: 44 ft 5 in (13.5 m)
- Beam: 21 ft 11 1/2 in (6.7 m)
- Armament: 8 × 12-pounder carronades

HMS Tickler was a cutter built at Dover in 1798 as the mercantile Lord Duncan. Between October 1798 and October 1801 she served the Royal Navy as the hired armed cutter Lord Duncan. Lord Duncan captured or recaptured several vessels, including one privateer. The Navy purchased Lord Duncan in October 1808 and renamed her HMS Tickler. It sold her in 1816.

== Hired armed cutter ==
Lord Duncan served under contract between 8 October 1798 and 18 October 1801. For almost the entire time she was under the command of Lieutenant William Wells.

Lord Duncan, and the hired armed cutters Dolphin and Lion were in company on 26 March 1799 when they recaptured the brigs Triton and Search.

In October 1800 Wells and the crew of Lord Duncan received prize money for the fishing vessels Julie and Recompense, and salvage money for the recapture of the sloop Johnstone.

On 20 December 1800 Lord Duncan brought into Deal a French privateer, formerly the George and Mary, of Cowes. The privateer was Eclair, which Lord Duncan had captured on 18 December. Lord Duncan was returning from having escorted a convoy when she encountered and captured the French cutter privateer. Eclair, of three 2-pounder guns and small arms, and a crew of 20 men under the command of Jacquiere Toussaint le Terrier. She was two days out of Cherbourg, and had not captured anything. (Note: Éclair was a 31-ton (of load) privateer from Cherbourg, under Jacques-Toussaint Leterrier. French records give the date of capture as 18 December 1800.)

On 26 December the hired armed cutters Lord Duncan and Vigilant recaptured the brig Elizabeth.

Unfortunately, after the end of her contract with the Admiralty, Lord Duncan did not appear in Lloyd's Register or the Register of Shipping. Her career subsequent mercantile career is currently obscure.

== Royal Navy cutter ==
The Admiralty purchased on 14 October 1808 and registered on that date as HMS Tickler.

In 1809 Lieutenant Richard Burton commissioned Tickler for the Channel. He commanded her in 1809 and 1810. In December 1810 Lieutenant Simon Hopkinson replaced Burton.

On 8 December 1813 HMS Horatio, under the command of Captain Lord George Stuart, and HMS Amphion captured the island of Showen during the Dutch uprising. The two British ships landed a small joint force of marines and seamen who met no opposition as the French surrendered first. In addition to prisoners, guns, and arms, the British re-captured a French gunboat and a brig of 14 guns that turned out to be the former HMS Bustler. Bustler had been serving as station ship at Ziericksee. Tickler was in company with Horatio and Amphion. (Note: The first-class shares of the prize and head money for Bustler were worth £237 17s 0½d. The sixth-class shares, those of an Ordinary Seaman, were worth £2 1s 2¼d.)

== Fate ==
Tickler was paid off in August 1815. The "Principal Officers and Commissioners of His Majesty's Navy" first offered the "Tickler cutter, of 116 tons", lying at Plymouth, for sale on 30 May 1816. She was last offered on 28 August 1816. She was sold on that day.
