= HMS Bustler (1805) =

Brig of the Royal Navy

History

United Kingdom
- Name: HMS Bustler
- Ordered: 20 November 1804
- Builder: Obadiah Ayles, Topsham, Exeter
- Laid down: March 1805
- Launched: 12 August 1805
- Captured: 26 December 1808

France
- Name: Bustler
- Acquired: 1808 by capture
- Captured: 8 December 1813

General characteristics
- Class & type: Confounder-class brig
- Tons burthen: 18053/94 (bm)
- Length: Overall: 84 ft 0 3/4 in (25.6 m); Keel: 69 ft 8 7/8 in (21.3 m)
- Beam: 22 ft 0 3/4 in (6.7 m)
- Depth of hold: 11 ft 0 in (3.4 m)
- Sail plan: Brig
- Complement: Royal Navy:50; French Navy:67
- Armament: Royal Navy: 12 × 18-pounder carronades + 2 × 12-pounder chase guns; French Navy:12 × 16-pounder carronades + 2 ×8-pounder long guns

HMS Bustler was launched at Topsham in 1805. The French captured her in 1808 when she stranded and attempts to set fire to her failed. The French Navy took her into service as Bustler. The British recaptured her in 1813 when attempts by her crew to scuttle her failed. The Royal Navy did not take her into service and her subsequent disposition is currently obscure.

== Royal Navy ==
In February 1806 Bustler was under the command of Lieutenant Richard Welch. The gunbrigs Bustler, Blazer, and Furious shared in the proceeds from the capture on 13 August 1806 of Experiencia.

In 1807 Lieutenant Edward Morris was in temporary command until Lieutenant Welch returned to command.

Blazer, Bustler, and Tickler shared in the proceeds of the detention on 27 August 1807 of Hausstind, Auroe, master. Blazer, Bustler, and Princess of Orange shared in the proceeds when their boats detained Eos and Amicitia on 28 August. (Note: A second-class share of the proceeds, that of a Lieutenant, was worth £30 1s 6½d; a sixth-class share, that of an Ordinary Seaman, was worth £1 1s 0¼d.)

That same month Blazer, Bustler, and Furious detained Rosenora.

On 1 June 1808 Bustler, under Welch's command, captured the French schooner Deux Guillaume and the boats Felix and Bien Venu.

Capture: On 26 December 1808 Bustler was cruising off the north coast of France when she ran aground in thick weather. As the tide went out she fell on her side. As the weather cleared it was found that she was about two hundred yards from Cape Gris-Nez. Welch put Bustler's boats into the water to pull her off, but a shore battery started an accurate fire on her. Welch ordered most of the crew aboard the boats, which took them off. He stayed behind with a small party to set fire to her. The cutter Nymphe came up and picked up the crew. Welch and his men set fire to Bustler and then rowed to the cutter. When the fire appeared to go out Nymphe attempted to return to Bustler, but luggers and gunboats could be seen approaching from Calais and Boulogne and the British gave up and sailed off. The subsequent court martial blamed the grounding on negligence by the master and pilot. It ordered them dismissed the service, mulcted of all pay, and to be imprisoned for a year.

== French Navy ==
The French Navy purchased Bustler on 18 March 1809 and commissioned her, without change of name, at Boulogne on 16 April. She was stationed in the waters of Escault and at Vlissingen, and moored at Antwerp from April 1810.

On 8 December 1813 HMS Horatio, under the command of Captain Lord George Stuart, and HMS Amphion captured the island of Schowen during the Dutch uprising. The two British ships landed a small joint force of marines and seamen, who met no opposition as the French surrendered first. In addition to prisoners, guns, and arms, the British re-captured a French gunboat and a brig of 14 guns that turned out to be Bustler. Bustler had been serving as station ship at Zierikzee, the capital of Schowen. HMS Tickler was in company. (Note: Prize money for Bustler was paid in 1815. A first-class share was worth £237 17s; a sixth-class share, that of an Ordinary Seaman, was worth £2 1s 2d.)

== Fate ==
Bustler's subsequent disposition is currently uncertain, though she may have fallen into the hands of the Dutch.
