= Military history of Norway =

The military history of Norway commences before the Viking Age with the internal wars fought between regional kings to obtain the supreme kingship of the whole of Norway. The most famous period of Norwegian history and thus military history is the Viking Age, but the early Middle Ages was the era when Norwegian military power in Europe reached its peak. Since then the Norwegian military has experienced long periods of neglect, but also rearmament and victories.

== 793–1050: Viking Age ==
- 793 – Vikings raid Lindisfarne monastery on Holy Island in the North Sea. This is considered the start of the Viking Raids. A large Norwegian exodus occurred particularly to the islands in the west.
- 872 Harald I of Norway defeats the last petty kings in the Battle of Hafrsfjord and forms the first united Norway.
- 911 Emperor of Western Francia Charles the Simple surrenders what will later be known as Normandy to Viking chief Rollo.
- 991 Olaf I of Norway defeats the Anglo-Saxons in the Battle of Maldon.
- 1000 Norway is conquered by Denmark
- 1020s Thorfinn Karlsefni battles skraelings in Vinland
- 1030 Olaf II of Norway is defeated in the Battle of Stiklestad.

== Early period ==
- 1043 Magnus I of Norway defeats the Wends at Lyrskov Heath.
- 1048-1064 Danish-Norwegian war
- 1066 Harald III of Norway defeats the English in the Battle of Fulford leading to his control of York.
- 1066 The Norwegians are defeated in the Battle of Stamford Bridge.
- 1107–10 Sigurd I of Norway leads a crusade to Iberia and the Holy Land.

== Civil war ==
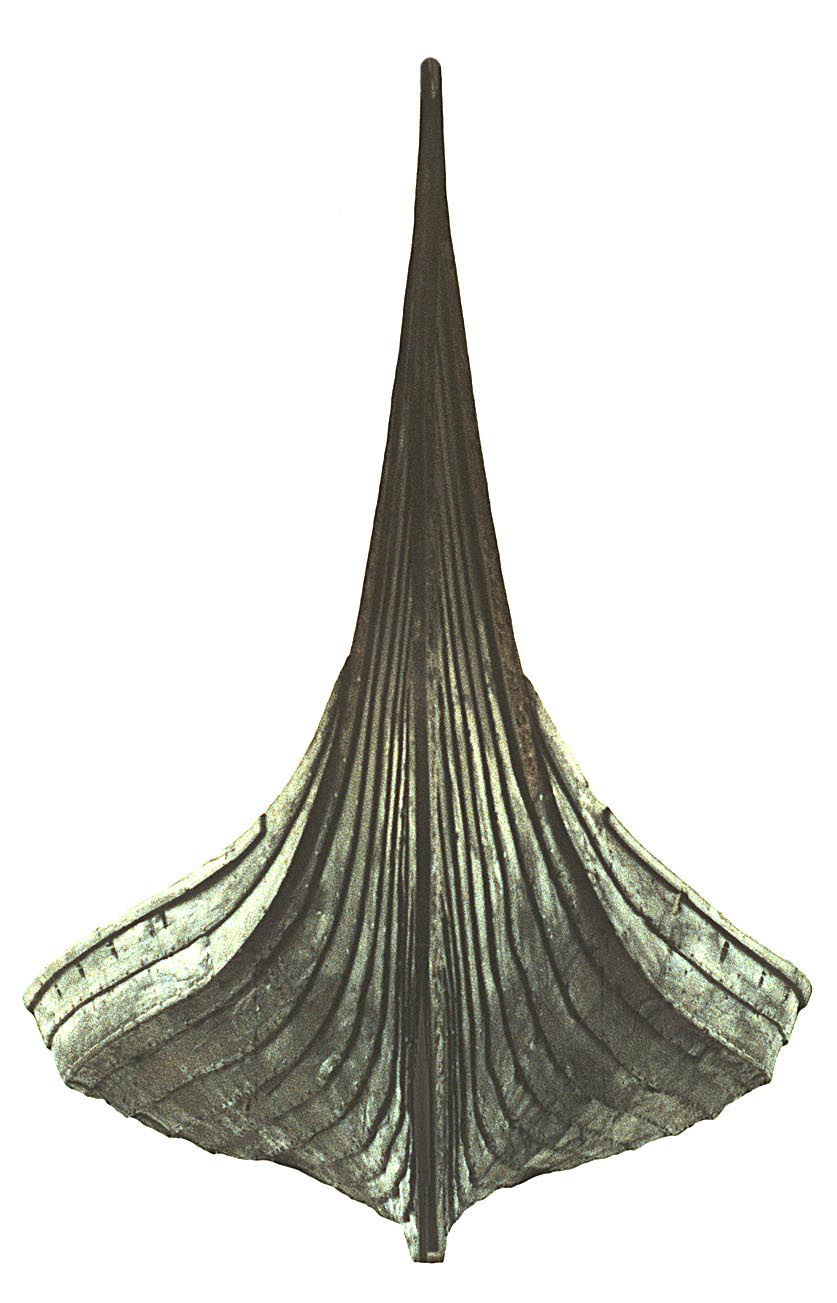
Norwegian longship

The civil war era of Norwegian history (Norwegian borgerkrigstida) is a term used for the period between 1130 and 1240 in the history of Norway. During this time, a series of civil wars were fought between rival kings and pretenders to the throne of Norway. The reason for the wars is one of the most debated topics in Norwegian medieval history. The goal of the warring parties was always to put their man on the throne, starting with the death of king Sigurd the Crusader in 1130. In the first decades of the civil wars, alliances were shifting, and centered around the person of a king or pretender, but eventually, towards the end of the 12th century, two rival parties emerged, known as the birkebeiner and the bagler. After these two parties were reconciled in 1217, a more ordered system of government centered around the king was gradually able to bring an end to the frequent risings. The failed rising of duke Skule Bårdsson in 1240 was the final event of the civil war era. The country came out of the civil wars in 1240 as a much more unified and consolidated kingdom than it had been in 1130. The rule of King Haakon and his successors until 1319 has sometimes been called the golden age of the Norwegian medieval kingdom, by later historians. Under King Haakon Haakonsson, a centralised administration was for the first time built up, with a chancellery in Bergen, which became the first capital city of the country. Clear succession laws were put into place, stipulating one single ruler, who had to be of legitimate birth. The Old Norse language, which had first been written with the Latin alphabet in the 12th century, was used in administration, as well as for the composition of original literature, and the translation of foreign literature. Haakon also brought Iceland and Greenland under Norwegian rule, in the early 1260s, at which point the kingdom of Norway reached its largest territorial extent.

== Peak and decline ==
- 1262–1266 The Scottish–Norwegian War concerning the control over the Hebrides and the Isle of Man. The Battle of Largs in 1263, which was the only major battle, had an inconclusive result, but over time Scottish profited and gained control over the Hebrides in return for recognising Norwegian rule in Orkney and Shetland.

In 1295, Magnus VI of Norway forged an alliance with France and Scotland against England, whereby Norway undertook to supply the King of France with 300 ships and 50 000 troops. It is clear that Norway could not have the manpower to fulfill the terms of this treaty, however, it was never put to the test.

In 1299, King Haakon V of Norway took the throne, and moved the capital of the country to Oslo. Haakon led an active foreign policy, aimed at increasing Norway's influence in Scandinavia. These policies, which included complex dynastic ties between the Nordic royal houses, were to lead Norway into several centuries of unions with her neighbours. Over time Norway's position in the unions would be increasingly weak. The Black plague came to Norway in 1349 and raged until 1351, severely weakening Norway's military abilities.

== Union wars 1434–1523 ==
The union wars are a period of constant struggle of dominance of the union between Denmark and Sweden. Norway for the most part keeps out of the struggle. In 1501 The Swedes attack Norway but are forced back. However, when the Swedes eventually defeats the Danes and secedes from the union it leaves Norway the sole weak partner in a union with a much stronger Denmark. The elite in Norway was so weakened that it was not able to resist the pressures from the Danes. More and more decisions were taken in Copenhagen and the Norwegian Riksråd was eventually disbanded. The Danish crown was represented by a governor styled Statholder, but it was always important for the King to maintain Norway's legal status as a separate hereditary kingdom. The Norwegian Army would remain a separate body, but a common fleet was established in 1509.

== Seven-Year War 1563–1570 ==
- 1563, 31 July – Ambition and a fight over the right to each other's national weapons, war breaks out between Denmark and Sweden
- 1563, 15 September – A Danish army moves into Sweden and occupies Älvsborg
- 1564, 30 May – A Danish fleet under the command of Herluf Trolle defeats a Swedish fleet between Öland and Gotland
- 1565 – The war's only big battle stands at Axtorna. Rantzau defeats a numerically superior Swedish army
- 1571, 25 January – A peace treaty is concluded and terminates the war between Denmark and Sweden. Denmark gives back Älvsborg in return for 150.000 daler (Danish coin).

== Northern wars ==
The Northern Wars (1596–1720) were a period of almost continual war and preparation for war, including the Kalmar War (1611–1613), the Thirty Years' War (1618–1648), the Northern War (1655–1658), the Gyldenløve War (1675–1679) and culminating in the Great Northern War (1700–1721).

== Kalmar War 1611–1613 ==
- 1611, 4 April War between Denmark-Norway and Sweden breaks out when Sweden attempts to break the Danish monopoly on trade with Russia
- 1611, 11 June The Swedish Army is defeated at Kalmar.
- 1612, The Battle of Kringen was an ambush perpetrated by a Norwegian peasant militia against Scottish mercenary soldiers who were on their way to enlist in the Swedish army for the Kalmar War.
- 1613, 20 January Denmark-Norway and Sweden sign a peace treaty. Denmark becomes an uncontested power nation in Scandinavia

== 30-Year War 1618–1648 ==
=== Torstenson War 1643–1645 ===
In December 1643 war with Sweden breaks out because of a long dispute over the dominance of the Øresund, and dissent over the Øresund toll. On 1 July 1644 the Royal Dano-Norwegian Navy meets the Swedish Fleet at the Battle of Colberger Heide. The battle ends in a decisive Danish victory, and the Swedish withdraw to the Kiel Bay.

Norway, which was then governed by Christian's son-in-law, Statholder (royal governor) Hannibal Sehested, was a reluctant participant. The Norwegian populace opposed an attack on Sweden, correctly suspecting that an attack on Sweden would only leave them open to counterattack. Their opposition to Statholder Sehested's direction grew bitter, and the war was lampooned as the "Hannibal war". Understandably, the Danes cared little for Norwegian public sentiment when Denmark itself was seriously threatened. Hence Jacob Ulfeld initiated an attack into Sweden from Norwegian Jemtland. He was driven back out of Sweden and Swedish troops temporarily occupied Jemtland as well as advancing into the Norwegian Østerdal before being driven back.

Sehested had made preparations to advance with his own army and a similar army under Henrik Bjelke into Swedish Värmland, but was ordered to relieve the King in the Danish attack on Gothenburg. Upon the arrival of Sehested the King joined his fleet and performed heroically, even though wounded, preventing Torstensson's army from moving onto the Danish islands.

On the Norwegian front, Sehested attacked the newly founded Swedish city of Vänersborg and destroyed it. He also sent Norwegian troops under the command of Georg Reichwein Sr. across the border from Vinger and Eidskog as well as troops under Henrik Bjelke into Swedish Dalsland.

12 October 1644 a combined Swedish and Dutch fleet defeats a Danish fleet at Fehmarn. This effectively decides the outcome of the war. In February 1645 peace negotiations are started in Brømsebro and on 13 August Denmark and Sweden conclude the peace of Brømsebro. Denmark is forced to hand over Gotland, Øsel and Halland (South Sweden) as well as the Norwegian province Jemtland, Herjedalen and Idre & Serna. This peace was highly unpopular as the Norwegian Army had performed well and was conducting the war on Swedish soil. The Norwegian provinces had not been lost in war, but was sourrendered by the king during negotiations.

== Northern War 1655–1660 ==
Frederick III was suffering under the humiliating loss of traditional Danish provinces to Sweden in 1645. As Charles X appeared to be fully occupied in Poland, Frederick III judged the time appropriate for recapture of the other Danish-Norwegian provinces. The King's Council agreed to war, a decision that led rapidly to ruin.

The Norwegian phase of the war went well. A Norwegian force of 2000 men recaptured Jemtland and Herjedalen. A Norwegian force set out from Bohuslen to join the Danish force invading Sweden from Skåne.

Reacting swiftly, by forced marches Charles X attacked Denmark with great success leaving the humiliated Danes with no choice but to sue for peace on any terms.

As a result, the Treaty of Roskilde was negotiated in 1658. The terms were brutal:

- Denmark ceded the provinces of Skåne, Blekinge and Halland
- Norway was forced to hand over Trøndelag and Bohuslen
- Closing of the Sound to non-Swedish warships

Charles X did not keep the peace and in the remainder of the war the Norwegian army successfully defended Norway from Swedish attacks and recaptured Trøndelag. In the Treaty of Copenhagen Norway kept Trøndelag but the other Norwegian provinces were to remain with Sweden.

== Scanian War 1675–1679 ==
=== Gyldenløve War ===
Simultaneously with the Danish invasion, an attack against Sweden was also launched from Norway, to force the Swedes to fight a two-front war. It was named after general Gyldenløve, who led the Norwegian offensive. Despite the defeat at Fyllebro, the successful invasion of Scania allowed Norwegian troops to capture Bohuslän. During the winter of 1677, the Norwegian army was increased to 17,000 men, allowing operations to increase further. Gyldenløve captured the fortress at Marstrand in July and joined forces with General Løvenhjelm. The Swedes mounted a counteroffensive under the command of Magnus Gabriel De la Gardie, sending an army of 8,000 to expel the Norwegian forces. They were defeated by the Norwegians, and pushed further back into Bohuslän. Simultaneously, Norwegian forces also retook Jemtland. However the war turned to Norway's disfavor when the Swedes succeeded in its attempts towards Denmark. Peace was negotiated between France (on behalf of Sweden) and Denmark at the Treaty of Fontainebleau on August 23, 1679. The peace, which was largely dictated by France, stipulated that all territory lost by Sweden during the war should be returned. Thus the terms formulated at the Treaty of Roskilde remained in force. It was reaffirmed by the Treaty of Lund, signed by Denmark-Norway and Sweden themselves. Denmark however received minor war reparations from Sweden. Again Norwegian provinces held by the Norwegian army at the conclusion of hostilities were surrendered by the Danish king in a treaty.

== Great Northern War 1700–1720 ==
During September 1709 Norwegian forces were ordered to mobilise, and by the end of October 6,000 men were assembled on the Swedish border at Svinesund while 1,500 were congregated near the border at Kongsvinger.

In August 1710, Baron Løvendal arrived in Norway as governor and commander of a country much drained in resources by the wars of the past century. The governor threw himself into building the civil and military leadership in the country just a short march from Sweden. When he left Norway in 1712, he had instituted reforms that served to create a civil service in Norway, and proceeded to document state activities to a degree never before seen in Norway, as well as being a strong military leader.

Baron Løvendal raised and equipped a Norwegian army to invade and recapture the former Norwegian province of Bohuslän under the leadership of General-Lieutenant Caspar Herman Hausmann. In parallel he proposed a strong fleet to provide protection and transportation to seaward, and Frederick IV committed to providing such a force under Vice Admiral Sehested in June 1711. In August, the Norwegian army marched into Bohuslen. But by late summer the fleet Vice Admiral Sehested's fleet had not appeared offshore, having been ordered by Frederick IV to return to Baltic waters. Without naval support, the Norwegian Army was forced to return to Norway.

== German Occupation 1940–1945 ==
During the Second World War, Nazi forces invaded Norway. Though Allied forces attempted to assist the Norwegians in the defense of their country, they failed and had to retreat and leave Norway to the Nazis. (Ironically, England had planned to invade Norway less than a week after the Germans had planned to do so, but as it happened, Hitler beat them to the punch.) Norway was occupied by Nazi Germany until 1945.

== Cold War (1949-1991) ==
Norway was a founding member of NATO in 1949.

Norway made a bilateral agreement with the United States to host U.S. nuclear weapons to be delivered by Norwegian military forces, in what was to become the NATO nuclear sharing concept, but ultimately did not partake in the scheme.

Norway frequently hosted NATO exercises during the Cold War, including the Allied Command Europe Mobile Force's Exercise Atlas Express.

== War in Afghanistan (2001–2021) ==
Norway participated in Operation Enduring Freedom, sustaining a total of 10 fatalities before withdrawing in August 2021.

== See also ==
- List of Norwegian battles
