= HMS Horatio (1807) =

Frigate of the Royal Navy

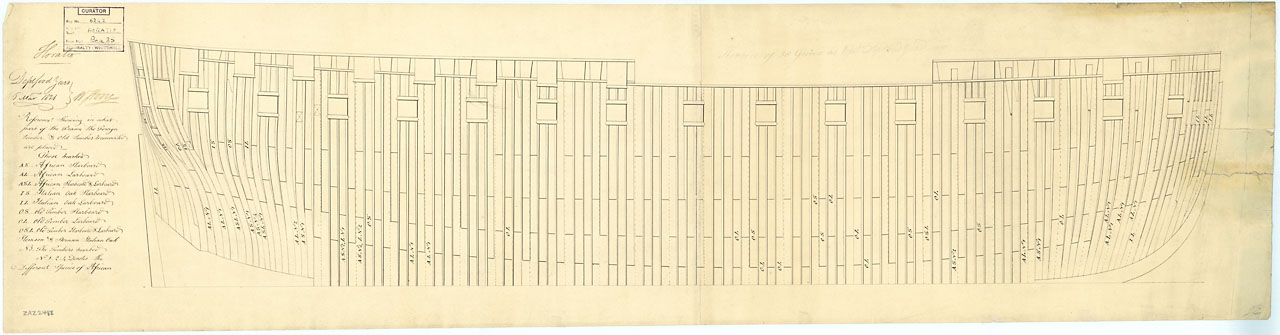
- Drawing of Horatio after repair in 1819

History

United Kingdom
- Name: HMS Horatio
- Ordered: 15 June 1805
- Builder: George Parsons, Bursledon, Hampshire
- Laid down: July 1805
- Launched: 23 April 1807
- Completed: 4 August 1807
- Fate: Sold to break up 1861 at Charlton

General characteristics
- Class & type: Lively-class frigate
- Tons burthen: 1,071 51/94 tons bm (as designed)
- Length: 154 ft (47 m)
- Beam: 39 ft 5 in (12.01 m)
- Draught: 13 ft 6 in (4.11 m)
- Propulsion: Sail
- Sail plan: Full-rigged ship
- Complement: 284 (later raised to 300, then in 1813 to 320)
- Armament: As ordered : UD: 28 × 18-pounder guns; QD: 2 × 9-pounder guns + 12 × 32-pounder carronades; FC: 2 × 9-pounder guns + 2 × 32-pounder carronades

HMS Horatio was a Royal Navy 38-gun fifth-rate Lively-class frigate, built out of fir timbers at the yard of George Parsons in Bursledon. The ship saw service with the Royal Navy during the Napoleonic Wars and up to the mid 19th century.

== Construction ==
It was launched on 23 April 1807 and fitting out was completed at Portsmouth Dockyard by 4 August 1807. Captain George Scott was given charge of the ship in June 1807.

== Napoleonic Wars ==
Horatio was soon deployed to take part in the Caribbean campaign of 1803–1810 as part of the ongoing Napoleonic Wars.

=== Capture of Junon ===
On the morning of 10 February 1809, Horatio along with the sloop HMS Driver came upon the French frigate Junon pursuing a British brig-of-war (HMS Superieure) about 115 mi (185 km) north of Anguilla. Under the command of George Scott, Horatio engaged in battle the 44-gun Junon, commanded by Augustin Rousseau. The French frigate aimed above Horatio's decks, destroying its masts and rigging and causing many injuries, including to Captain Scott, who was incapacitated by a grape-shot blast to the shoulder, and to his first lieutenant, Manley Hall Dixon. Lieutenant George Douglas took over command for the rest of the 95-minute battle, at which point the badly damaged Junon attempted to flee.

At this point the brig Superieure and frigate Latona arrived in the area and joined the battle. After a short exchange of fire with Latona, Junon surrendered. In the engagement seven sailors on Horatio were killed and 26 wounded (17 of them seriously). On Latona there were six minor injuries. Thomas Colville, a seaman on Driver, was also badly injured. Scott described the British loss as "by no means Considerable" in relation to the "dreadful loss of the Enemy" suffered by the 323-man crew of Junon. He counted 130 French sailors killed and wounded, including Rousseau, who died shortly afterwards. The hull of Horatio suffered only minor damage, but the masts and rigging were essentially destroyed. In contrast, the hull of Junon was "most wonderfully cut up" and took on a great deal of water until the shot holes were patched.

The heroism of the crew of Horatio was recognized in 1847 when the Navy issued as clasp to the Naval General Service Medal inscribed "Horatio 10 Feby. 1809". Thirteen surviving crew members from Horatio received this clasp.

=== Later action during the Napoleonic Wars ===
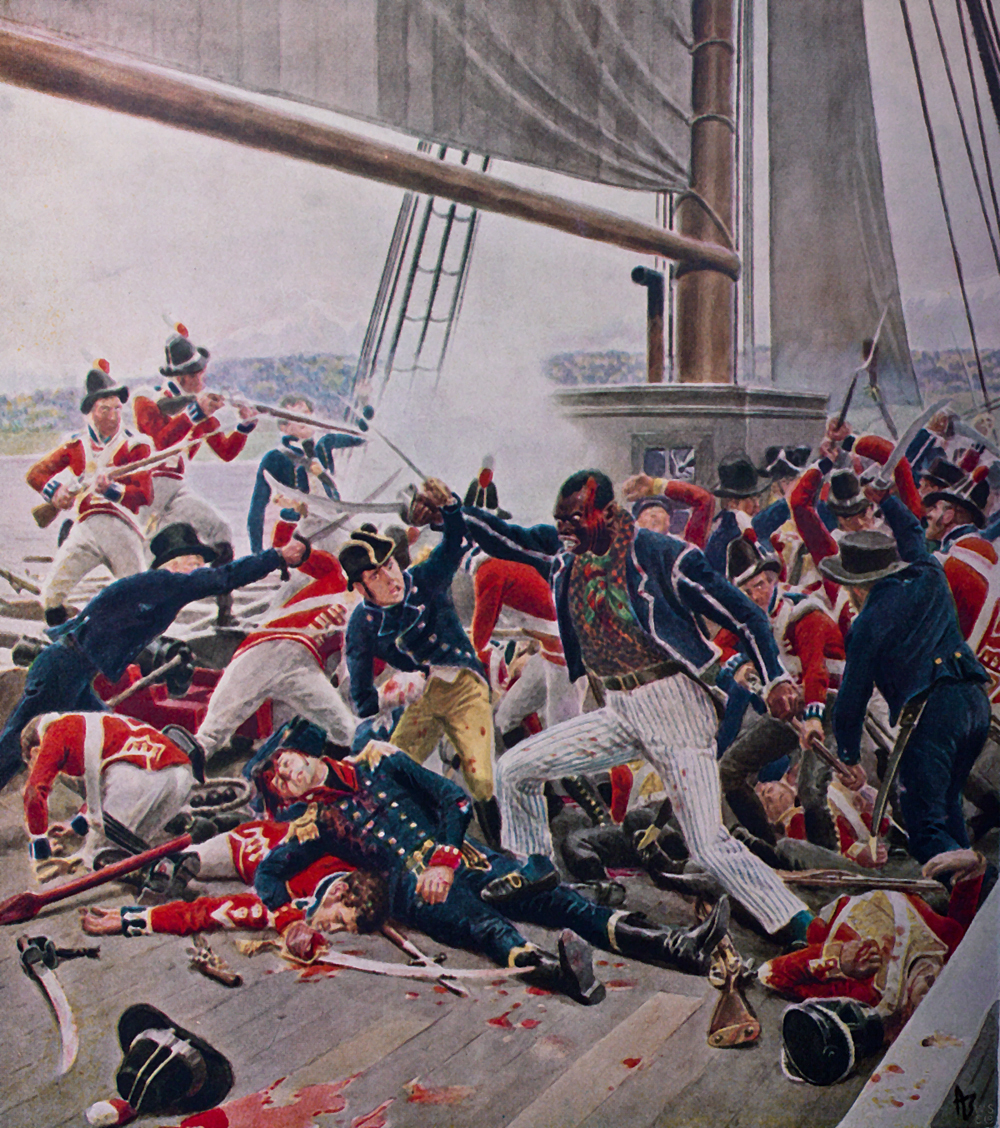
Horatio's crew boarding the Dano-Norwegian gunboat No. 114 during the Battle of Tromsø

A year later, on 21 February 1810, still apparently under Scott's command, Horatio gave chase to Necessité, followed by an hour's "running action" resulting in the capture of the French ship without injuries on either side. Necessité, which was built as a 40-gun ship but only carried 28 guns at the time, had a crew of 186 men and was carrying a cargo of naval stores and provisions from Brest to the French Indian Ocean colony of Isle de France. Scott later went on to become captain of HMS Asia, but was forced to resign in 1814 due to pain from the injuries he received during the battle with Junon.

By 1812, Horatio was under the command of Captain Lord George Stuart. In the Battle of Tromsø, boats from the frigate captured two Danish vessels, under the command of Lieutenant Hans Carl Bodenhoff, and their prize, an American vessel of about 400 tons burthen (bm) on 2 August. The two Danish vessels were schooner No. 114 (with six 6-pounders and 30 men), and cutter No. 97 (with four 6-pounders and 22 men). Nine men from Horatio were killed and 16 wounded, of whom two died later; the Danes lost ten men killed and 13 wounded.

On 8 December 1813, Horatio and HMS Amphion captured the island of Schouwen during the War of the Sixth Coalition. Both ships landed a small joint force of marines and sailors, who met no opposition as the French surrendered. In addition to prisoners, guns, and arms, the British captured a French gunboat and a brig of 14 guns that turned out to be Bustler. Bustler had been serving as station ship at Ziericksee. Tickler was in company with Horatio and Amphion. (Note: The first-class shares of the prize and head money for Bustler were worth £237 17s 0½d. The sixth-class shares, those of an Ordinary Seaman, were worth £2 1s 2¼d.)

In April 1814, the ship was assigned to lead convoys to North America, departing Portsmouth dockyard, via Cork, along with 54 merchant ships to Newfoundland. On 19 May 1814, Horatio arrived in Barbados from Bermuda along with a squadron of seven other British warships. On 2 June, it was in Halifax, Nova Scotia. The ship's voyages in the period from 12 August 1814 to 10 January 1816 are known in some detail due to the discovery of the illustrated logbook of midshipman John Smith Gould. During this period Horatio travelled to and painted Funchal, Madeira, the Ascension Islands, St. Helena, the Cape of Good Hope, Madras, Malacca, Singapore, Manilla, Macao, Ansons Bay and Rio de Janeiro. The log contains watercolours of icebergs that Gould called "ice islands" and pre- and post-eruption views of a volcano.

== Later service ==
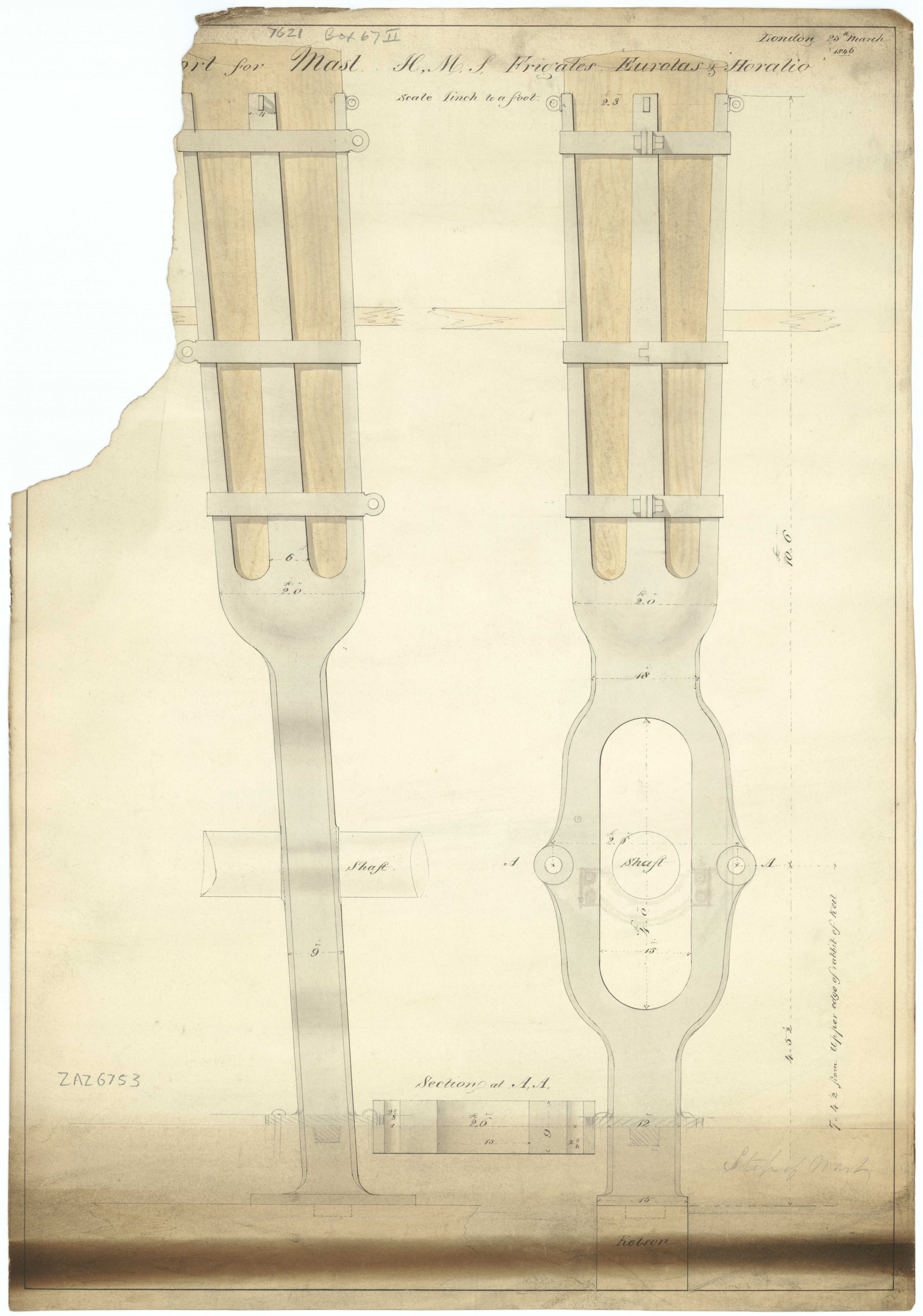
Drawing of the iron mast step (support) fitted to former frigates Horatio and Eurotas as part of their conversion to steam-powered guard-ships in 1845–46.

The ship spent 1816 in the East Indies, with calls at ports in India and China. At the end of 1816, Horatio was ordered home, and paid off at the beginning of 1817. The following year, the ship remained out of commission at Deptford.

Horatio underwent major repairs at Deptford Dockyard between 1817 and 1819, under the direction of the yard's master shipwright, William Stone. Many frames were replaced with new timber or reused timbers taken from other ships.

In late 1845 and early 1846, plans were drawn up to convert Horatio and Eurotas to become steam-powered screw-driven guard ships. Some sources suggest that the actual conversion work was performed at Chatham Dockyard in 1850, with Horatio being the first screw-driven frigate launched from that yard. After its conversion Horatio was posted to Sheerness.

Following the outbreak of the Crimean War in 1854, the navy revived the concept of the bomb vessel. As well as powered and unpowered newly built craft, in 1855 the navy earmarked four old sailing frigates that had recently been converted to screw propulsion to also be fitted with mortars: Horatio and Eurotas, plus the later frigates Seahorse and Forth. However, only the work on Horatio was completed; the other conversions were cancelled.

== Fate ==
After 54 years of service, Horatio was apparently sold for breaking up at Charlton, Kent, in 1861. Other reports give a sale date of 1865.
