= HMS Amphion (1798) =

Frigate of the Royal Navy

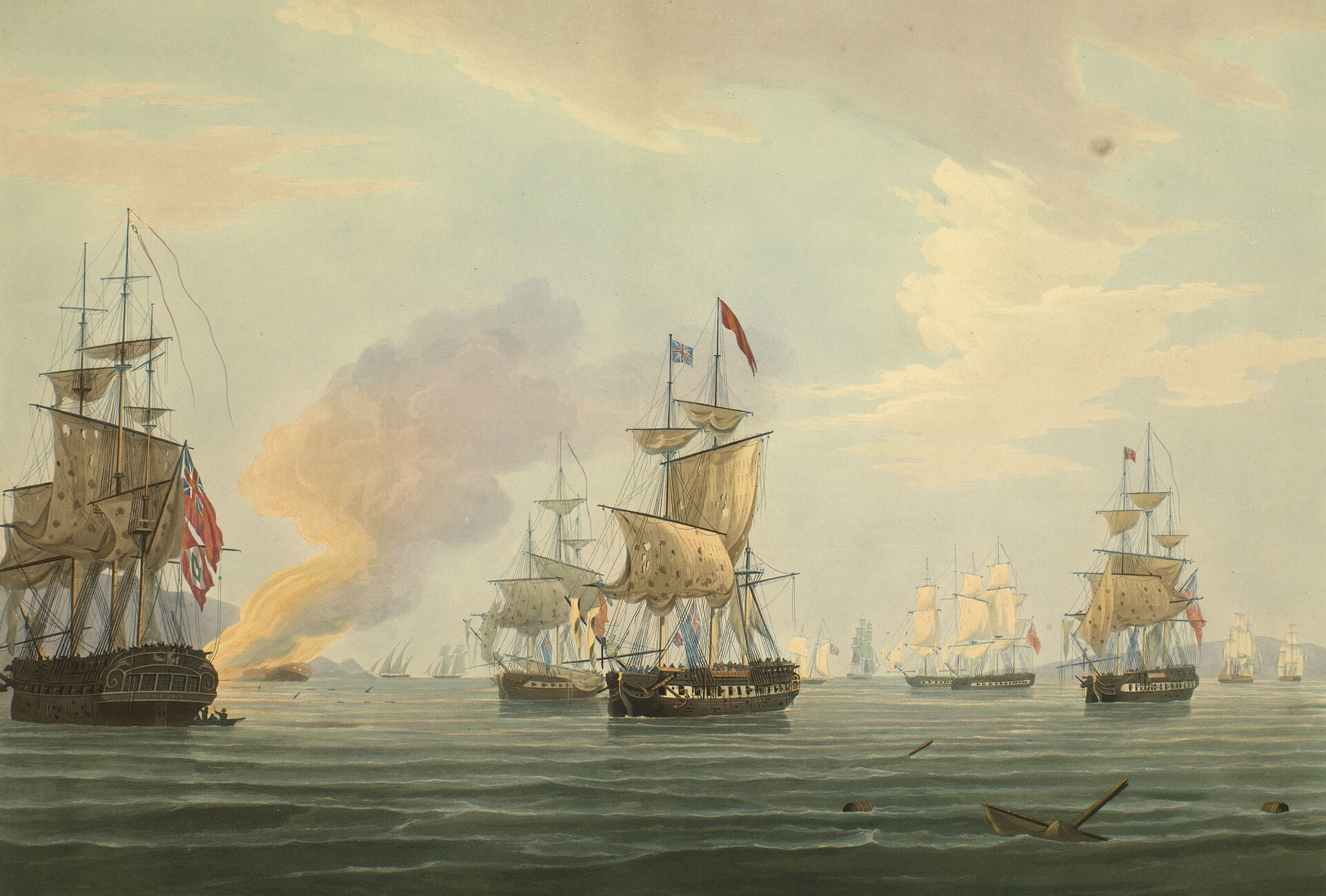
- A boat from Amphion (centre) boards the Bellona (far left) at Lissa

History

Great Britain
- Name: Amphion
- Ordered: 11 June 1796
- Builder: Betts, Mistleythorn
- Laid down: July 1796
- Launched: 19 March 1798
- Fate: Sunk as a breakwater in November 1820; Wreck sold in September 1823

General characteristics as built
- Class & type: 32-gun fifth rate frigate
- Tons burthen: 914 (bm)
- Length: 144 ft (43.9 m) (gundeck)
- Beam: 37 ft 6 in (11.4 m)
- Propulsion: Sails
- Sail plan: Full-rigged ship
- Armament: 26 × 18-pounder long guns + 6 × 24-pounder carronades + 6 × 6-pounder long guns

HMS Amphion was a 32-gun fifth rate frigate, the lead ship of her class, built for the Royal Navy during the 1790s. She served during the Napoleonic Wars. Amphion was built by Betts, of Mistleythorn, and was launched on 19 March 1798.

== Career ==
Amphion's first mission was to Jamaica in 1798, but by 1799 she was off Southern Spain under Captain Bennett. That year she captured a Spanish letter of marque, Nuestra Senora del Corvodorvya (alias Asturiana), on 25 November 1799. Asturiana was armed with eighteen 8-pounders and two 12-pounder guns, and four 36-pounder howitzers. She and her crew of 180 men were sailing from Cadiz to La Vera Cruz with a valuable cargo. She had been part of a convoy of five vessels. Amphion shared with Alarm in the head-money that was finally paid in March 1829. On 10 March, 1800 USS Constellation made contact with her, HMS Castor and HMS Queen at apx. (23°35′N 83°19′W).

Amphion remained in the Mediterranean until the Peace of Amiens. In 1802 Amphion was employed in attacking British smugglers in the English Channel and later conveyed the ambassador to Portugal to Lisbon.

In 1803 Amphion was paid off but later recommissioned and transported Horatio Nelson to the Mediterranean to take command arriving on 15 June, 1803 at Malta. She remained in the Mediterranean under Captain Samuel Sutton, and was part of the fleet blockading Toulon. Amphion was one of the ships selected to hunt and capture the Spanish treasure fleet destroyed at the action of 5 October 1804. In October 1805 the captaincy was given to William Hoste at Lisbon, and he sailed to Gibraltar and subsequently Algiers before operating off Cádiz and Sicily.

After the battle of Trafalgar on 21 October 1805, Amphion was at the blockade of Cadiz. On 25 November, Thunderer detained the Ragusan ship Nemesis, which was sailing from Isle de France to Leghorn, Italy, with a cargo of spice, indigo dye, and other goods. Amphion shared the prize money with ten other British warships. On 28 July 1806 the 3rd battalion of the Polish-Italian Legion, 500 strong, surrendered to Captain Hoste in the Amphion and the 78th Foot at Crotone.

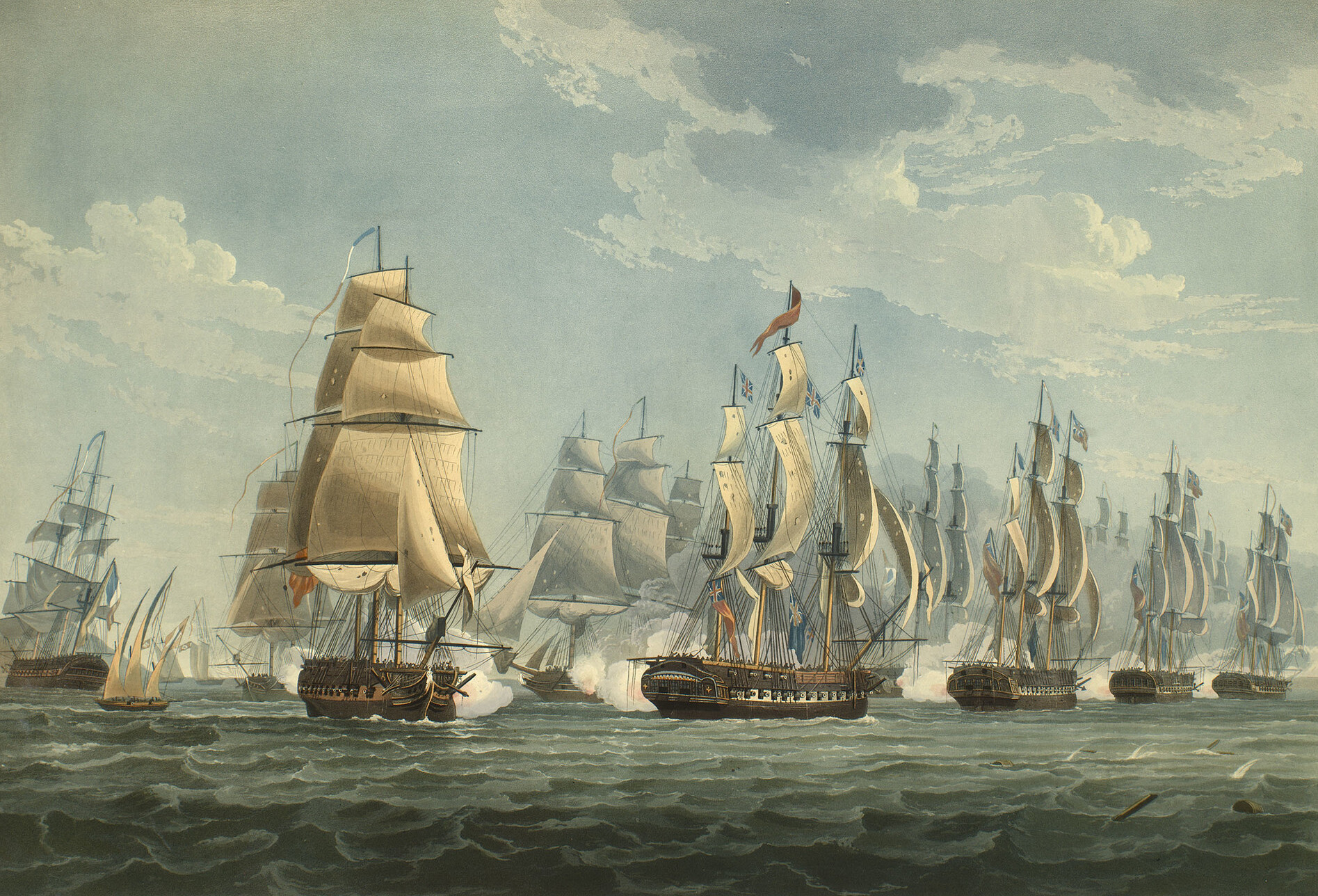
Amphion (centre) during the middle of the Battle of Lissa, 13 March 1811

In May 1808, Hoste was ordered to attack the French frigate Baleine off Rosas. Amphion succeeded in destroying the vessel without severe loss and in November joined HMS Unite off Trieste in the Adriatic. There Hoste operated against French and Italian shipping for the next three years, sailing from Lissa and periodically refitting at Malta. In this time, Hoste managed to capture or destroy huge quantities of French supplies and provoked the attention of a French squadron under Bernard Dubourdieu. On 13 March 1811, Dubourdieu attacked at the Battle of Lissa and was heavily defeated, Amphion's fire killing Dubourdieu and wrecking his flagship. Two other ships were captured, but Hoste was wounded and the ship returned to Britain.

In 1813 Amphion was attached to the North Sea fleet. On 8 December HMS Horatio, under the command of Captain Lord George Stuart, and Amphion captured the island of Showen during the Dutch uprising. The two British ships landed a small joint force of marines and seamen, who met no opposition as the French surrendered first. In addition to prisoners, guns, and arms, the British re-captured a French gunboat and a brig of 14 guns that turned out to be the former HMS Bustler. Tickler was in company with Horatio and Amphion. (Note: The first-class shares of the prize and head money for Bustler were worth £237 17s 0½d. The sixth-class shares, those of an Ordinary Seaman, were worth £2 1s 2¼d.)

In early 1814 Amphion continued to attack French shore positions along the North Sea coast but with the end of the war returned to Britain. In 1818 Amphion sailed to Brazil and in 1820 she was decommissioned.

== Fate ==
In November 1820 year Amphion was sunk as a breakwater at Woolwich. The wreck was subsequently sold in September 1823 to Joiliffe and Banks for breaking up.
