= Battle of Tromsø =

1812 battle of the Gunboat War

- Part of the Gunboat War
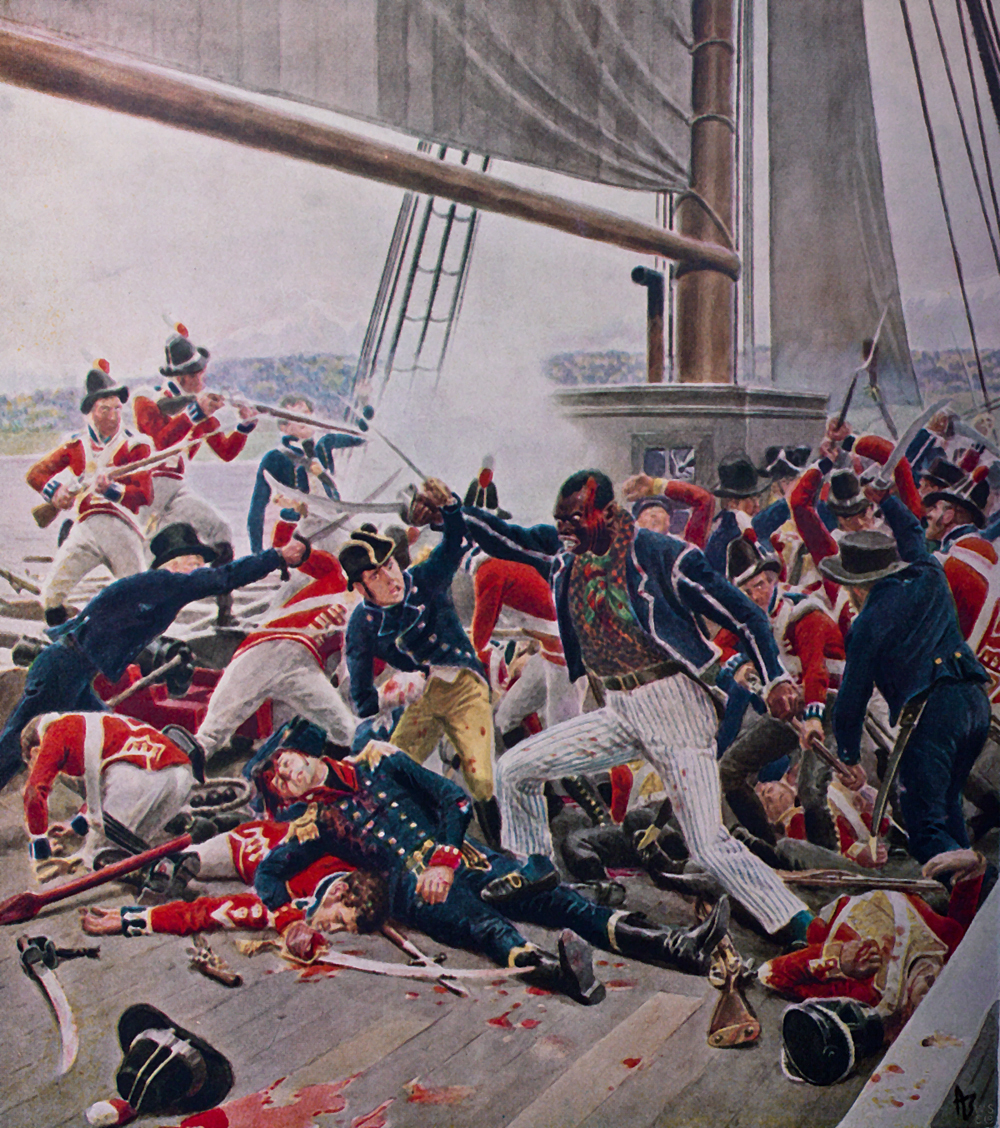
- c. 1910 illustration of the battle
Date	2 August 1812
Location	Off Tromsø, Norwegian Sea
Result	British victory

Belligerents
United Kingdom	Denmark–Norway

Commanders and leaders
Lord George Stuart	Hans Carl Bodenhoff (POW)

Strength
1 frigate	1 cutter 1 schooner

Casualties and losses
9 killed 16 wounded	5-10 killed 13 wounded 1 cutter captured 1 schooner captured

The Battle of Tromsø (also known as the Battle of Pølsehavna) was fought on 2 August 1812 between the British and Dano-Norwegian navies as part of the Gunboat War. HMS Horatio, a 38-gun British frigate under the command of Captain Lord George Stuart, was fired at by the 4-gun Dano-Norwegian cutter No. 97 which fled to Tromsø after discovering the ship's true identity. On the next day, Stuart sent a cutting out party of 80 men to capture No. 97 along with the 6-gun schooner No. 114, under Second Lieutenant Hans Carl Bodenhoff.

Both vessels were captured by the British, along with an American prize in Tromsø harbour. Stuart subsequently decided to return to England due to the high casualties his ships had sustained. Bodenhoff's bravery in battle led him to be nicknamed "the lion of Tromsø". The battle was both the last engagement fought by Britain in Norwegian waters during the Gunboat War and a contributing factor in the British Admiralty's decision to issue secret orders prohibiting risky attacks on foreign coasts.

== Background ==
In mid-1812, a Dano-Norwegian squadron of four gunboats and four armed supply schooners were sent north to defend the town of Tromsø and its grain stores, which at the time was defended by a garrison of 40 militiamen and seven cannons placed on a redoubt. Following the outbreak of the Gunboat War in 1807, the Danish and Norwegian coasts had been placed under blockade by the British and Swedish navies, and Norwegian coastal settlements were often vulnerable to attack. One of the British warships which operated off the Norwegian coast was HMS Horatio, a 38-gun frigate under the command of Captain Lord George Stuart.

== Battle ==
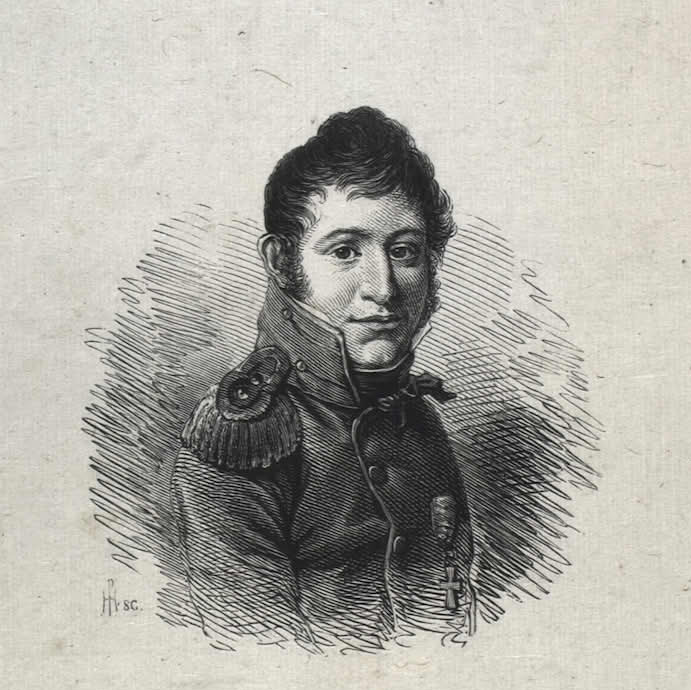
Hans Carl Bodenhoff, who was wounded and captured during the battle

On 1 August, Horatio sailed into the Kvalsundet strait north of Tromsø, intending on raiding Hammerfest and Vardøhus Fortress. One of the four Dano-Norwegian gunboats, the 4-gun cutter No. 97, proceeded to open fire at the British frigate before retreating to Tromsø when it was discovered that the targeted ship was much more powerful. There, No. 97 was joined by the 6-gun schooner No. 114, one of the other four gunboats. On the next day, Stuart sent four boats containing 80 men from Horatio in a cutting out attack against the two Dano-Norwegian gunboats in Tromsø. The boarding party attacked No. 97 first, capturing the vessel after her commander, Lieutenant Grøn, was wounded. The British then turned their attention on No. 114, which was under the command of Second Lieutenant Hans Carl Bodenhoff.

No. 114's crew beat off repeated boarding attempts, during which several of her crew were killed or wounded. Bodenhoff was badly wounded, but the boarding party's commander, Lieutenant A. M. Hawkins, saved his life by preventing a British sailor from delivering the final blow. Eventually, the British captured No. 114 as well. The Tromsø garrison, which was not assembled in time and whose cannons were out of range of the fighting, did not participate in the battle. Horatio's crew suffered nine men killed and 16 wounded, two of them mortally, while the Dano-Norwegians suffered between 5 and 10 killed and 13 wounded. The surviving crews of No. 97 and No. 114, including Bodenhoff, were taken prisoner, along with an American prize lying in Tromsø harbour.

== Aftermath ==
Following the battle, Stuart decided to return to England due to the high casualties his crew had sustained in the fighting. All three prizes were taken to England as well, and the prisoners of war captured off Tromsø remained in British captivity until 1814. Although the British had captured both warships in Tromsø harbour, the defenders had prevented Horatio from gaining access to the town's grain stores. Four men from the two Dano-Norwegian warships avoided being captured by the British by swimming ashore, and one later remarked of Bodenhoff:

They were a great fight, and our chief was in the lead the whole time. He defended himself like a lion, even though they had almost chopped him to pieces.

This quote led Bodenhoff to be nicknamed "the lion of Tromsø". The battle, which was the last engagement fought by Britain in Norwegian waters during the Gunboat War, was ultimately a contributing factor in the British Admiralty's decision to issue secret orders prohibiting risky attacks on foreign coasts.
