= Harald Fairhair's campaign in Götaland =

Harald Fairhair's campaign in Götaland was an attack that took place in the 870s.

Snorri Sturluson writes in Harald Fairhair's saga that Harald Fairhair disputed the Swedish king Eric Eymundsson's hegemony in what is today southern Norway.

He attacked and forced Viken to accept his rule and then plundered and burnt in Rånrike. Due to this, the Norwegian skald Þorbjörn hornklofi boasted that the Swedes stayed indoors whereas the Norwegians were out on the sea.

| Úti vill jól drekka, ef skal einn ráða, fylkir framlyndi, ok Freys leik heyja, Ungr leiddisk eldvelli ok inni at sitja, varma dyngju eða vöttu dúnsfulla. | The Norseman's king is on the sea, Tho' bitter wintry cold it be. On the wild waves his Yule keeps he. When our brisk king can get his way, He'll no more by the fireside stay Than the young sun; he makes us play The game of the bright sun-god Frey. But the soft Swede loves well the fire The well-stuffed couch, the doway glove, And from the hearth-seat will not move.(Samuel Laing's translation) |

The Gauts (Geats) did not accept this and assembled their forces. In the spring, they put stakes in Göta älv to stop Harald's ships. Harald Fairhair put his ships alongside the stakes and plundered and burnt everything he could reach. The Norwegian skald said of this:

| Grennir þröng at gunni gunnmás fyrir haf sunnan, sá var gramr, ok gumnum, geðvörðr, und sik jörðu. Ok hjálmtamiðr hilmir hólmreyðar lét ólman lindihjört fyrir landi lundprúðr við stik bundinn. | The king who finds a dainty feast, For battle-bird and prowling beast, Has won in war the southern land That lies along the ocean's strand. The leader of the helmets, he Who leads his ships o'er the dark sea, Harald, whose high-rigged masts appear Like antlered fronts of the wild deer, Has laid his ships close alongside Of the foe's piles with daring pride.(Samuel Laing's translation) |

The Geats arrived to the ships with a great army to fight king Harald, but they lost after great losses.

| Ríks, þreifsk reiddra öxa rymr, knáttu spjör glymja, svartskygð bitu seggi sverð, þjóðkonungs ferðar, Þá er, hugfyldra hölda, hlaut andskoti Gauta, hár var söngr um svírum, sigr, flugbeiddra vigra. | Whistles the battle-axe in its swing O'er head the whizzing javelins sing, Helmet and shield and hauberk ring; The air-song of the lance is loud, The arrows pipe in darkening cloud; Through helm and mail the foemen feel The blue edge of our king's good steel Who can withstand our gallant king? The Gautland men their flight must wing.(Samuel Laing's translation) |

Then the Norwegians travelled far and wide in Götaland, winning most of the battles. In one of the battles, the Geatish commander Hrani the Geat fell. Harald then proclaimed himself the ruler of all land north of Göta älv and north and west of lake Vänern and placed Guttorm Haraldsson to defend the region with a large force.
