= Battle of Thetford =

1004 battle in England

- Part of the Viking invasions of England
Date	1004 AD
Location	Thetford, England
Result	English victory

Belligerents
Kingdom of England	Kingdom of Denmark

Commanders and leaders
Ulfcytel Snillingr	Sweyn Forkbeard

Casualties and losses
Unknown	Heavy

The battle of Thetford occurred in 1004. The Anglo-Saxon chronicle reports a clash between an East Anglian Fyrd levied by Ulfketill The Bold and a raiding army led by the King of Denmark, Sveinn Forkbeard

The battle site was located in lands under the control of Ulfketill, a leading noble of East Anglia, at a site once thought to be near Wretham, but now thought to be at Rymer in Suffolk. The Anglo-Saxon Chronicle reports that the battle occurred after an attempt by Ulfketill and the councillors in East Anglia to negotiate a truce with Sweyn in return for a financial settlement; the Danes broke the truce, and plundered Thetford anyway. When returning to their ships however, they were met and engaged by a contingent of the East Anglian fyrd. Two of the Chronicle manuscripts state that the Danes later "admitted that they had never met with harder hand-play [fighting] in England than Ulfcytel gave them"

The Danes suffered heavy losses, and were probably only saved from destruction because Ulfketill’s order to destroy their ships was not carried out. They left England without causing any further devastation which has been recorded.
