= Battle of Vänersborg =

1645 battle between Sweden and Norway

- Part of the Torstenson War
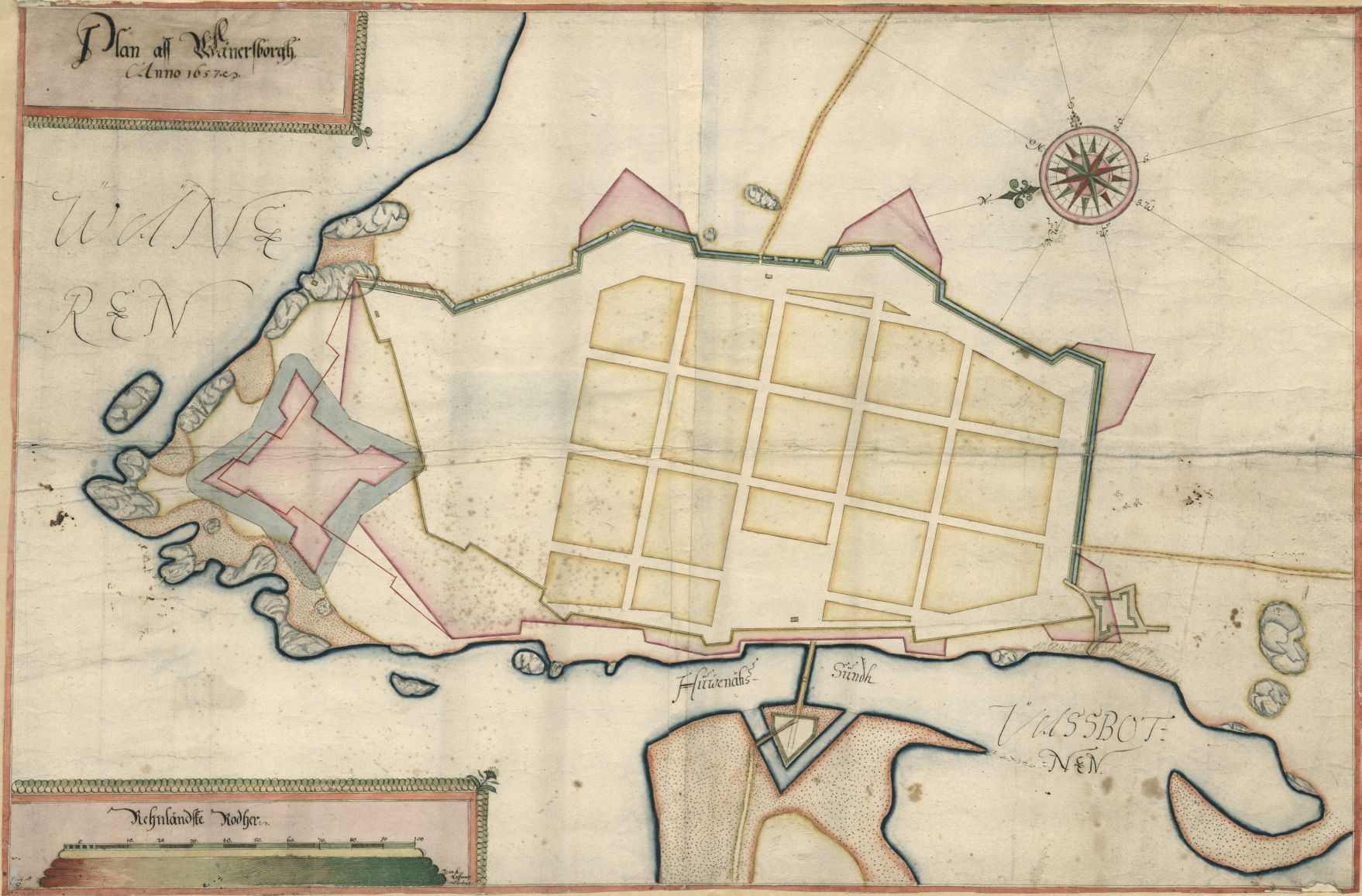
- Map of Vänersborg from 1657
Date	1645
Location	Vänersborg 58°22′50″N 12°19′30″E
Result	Swedish victory
Territorial changes	Norwegians retreat into Bohuslän

Belligerents
(yes) Swedish Empire	Denmark–Norway

Commanders and leaders
(Swedish Empire) Alexander Hamilton	(Denmark–Norway) Henrik Bielke

Units involved
(Swedish Empire) Vänersborg garrison	Unknown

Strength
100 men	Unknown

Casualties and losses
5 killed	24 killed

The Battle of Vänersborg was fought between Swedish and Norwegian forces during the Torstenson War in 1645. The Swedes were victorious and the Norwegians retreated to Bohuslän. The Dano-Norwegian commander was Henrik Bielke. A hundred men, led by captain Alexander Hamilton, had been assigned to the Swedish fortifications. In the initial attack, Norwegian troops lost 24 men, whereas the Swedish defenders lost five men, among them one corporal. The attack came a few months after Vänersborg had been burned to the ground in an attack the previous year.

The Swedish forces repelled three attacks before the sieging forces retreated. This marked the end of attacks on Vänersborg during the Torstenson War. Bielke and the Norwegian forces had to leave the area after the Swedish lieutenant colonel Per Lillie had returned with more Swedish troops.
