= Raid on the White Sea (1419) =

Norwegian raid on the White Sea (1419)
Date	1419
Location	Settlements around the White Sea
Result	Norwegian victory

Belligerents
(Kingdom of Norway (872–1397)) Norway	Novgorod

Commanders and leaders
Unknown	Unknown

Strength
At least more than 2 ships, 500 men	Unknown

Casualties and losses
Two boats destroyed	Many civilians slaughtered

In 1419, the Kingdom of Norway launched a raid against the Novgorod Republic in the White Sea. The Norwegians entered the sea with 500 men, proceeding to burn down many settlements and three monasteries, killing everybody they could. It is said that "men from beyond the volok" destroyed two of the Norwegian boats.
