= Assault on Karlsborg =

Norwegian attack on a Swedish fortress

- Part of the Dano–Swedish War (1449–1457)
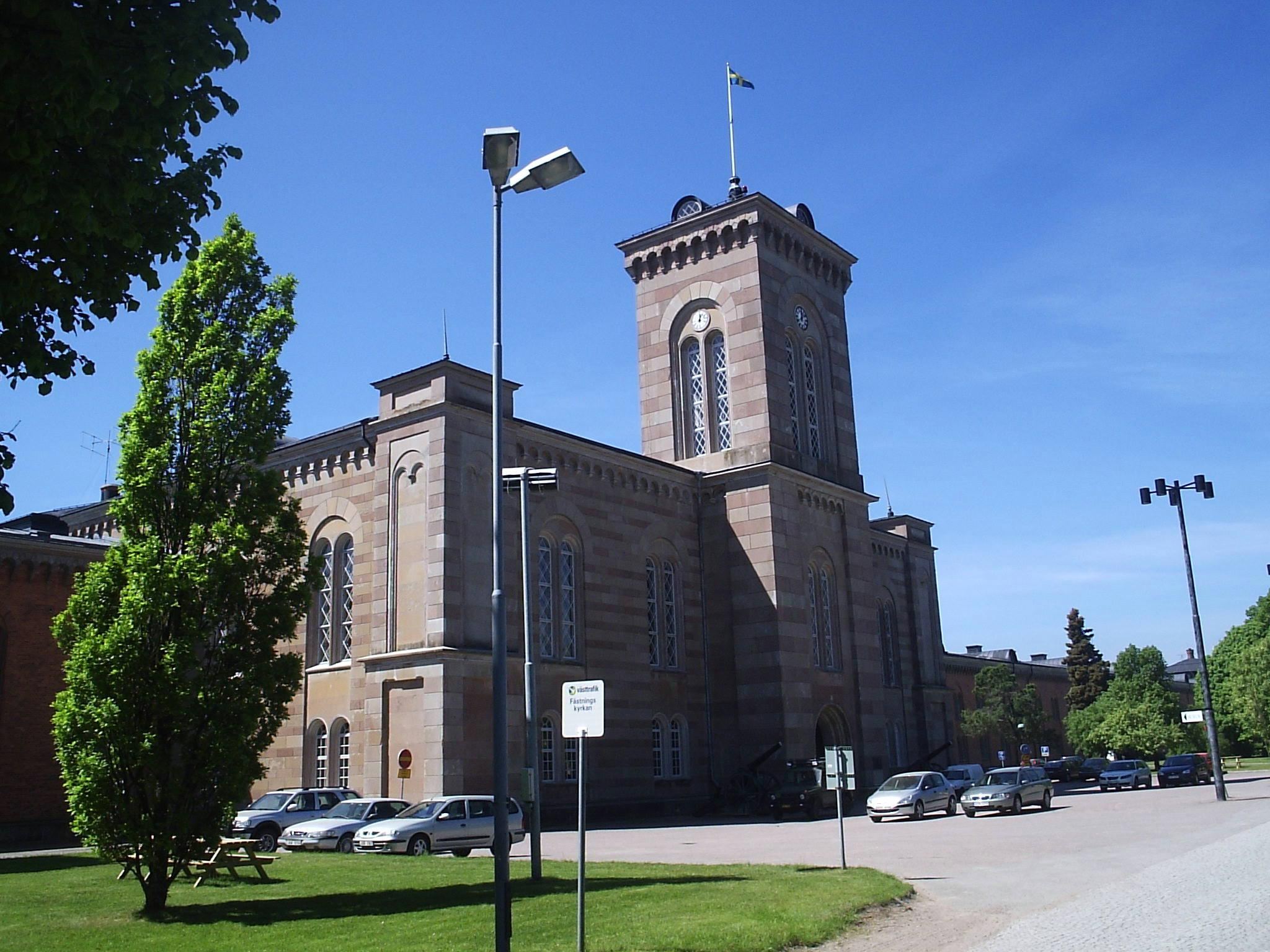
- Karlsborg's fortress church
Date	1456
Location	Karlsborg, Bohuslän 58°32′N 14°32′E
Result	Swedish victory
Territorial changes	Norwegians repulsed from Karlsborg

Belligerents
(History of Sweden (800–1521)) Sweden	(Kingdom of Norway (872–1397)) Norway

Commanders and leaders
(History of Sweden (800–1521)) Tord Karlsson Bonde	(Kingdom of Norway (872–1397)) Kolbjörn Gäst (POW)

Units involved
Unknown	Unknown

Strength
300 cavalrymen 100 "Small Swedes"	3,000 men (likely exaggerated)

Casualties and losses
Unknown	Many captured

The Assault on Karlsborg (Swedish: Anfallet mot Karlsborg; Norwegian: Angrepet på Karlsborg) was a failed Norwegian attack on the Swedish fortress of Karlsborg in 1456.

== Background ==
At the same time or shortly after a Danish attack into Västergötland, a Danish army had also went towards Småland, where they constructed a fortress named "Danaborg". After King Christian I had sailed home and left a small force at Danaborg, Tord Karlsson Bonde with a force of trained troops went towards Småland, where, with help from local mustered peasantry, decisively defeated the Danes and destroyed Dansborg, whereafter the people renamed the fortress to Danasorg, literally "Danish sorrow".

He then returned to Västergötland, where he unsuccessfully tried to reconquer Älvsborg, but he did manage to construct two fortresses along the Älv. One of these fortresses was named Billingsborg, which was placed near the outlet of the river, and the other one was named Gullborg, which was placed at the location that was later to be occupied by the fortress of "Göta lejon". He also constructed a stronghold on a clff along Kattegat, which he named Karlsborg after Karl Knutsson, who was the King of Sweden.

The Swedish Rim chronicle is the only source that details this campaign, according to the chronicle, the Norwegian army consisted of around 3,000 levied peasants which had been gathered in the winter. These troops had the objective of marching to "Lord Tord's Castle" which was most likely Karlsborg, since it claims that Kolbjörn Gäst, the leader of the Norwegian army, boasted that he would expel the Swedes "from Norway's land".

== Assault ==
Since Tord Bonde always had his scouts out, he was well aware of the Norwegian plans to destroy his fortress, and decided to engage them in the open field with 300 horsemen and 100 "Small Swedes". These so-called "Small Swedes", who could have also been a split up part of the cavalrymen, (Note: Depends on which source you consult) allegedly had no weapons except for stakes with iron tips, were hidden in surrounding forests after receiving the necessary instructions. Tord then launched a full-scale attack on the Norwegians, who quickly fortified themselves behind sledges they had brought with them, forming a "Sledding fort". Initially being unable to break through the Norwegian fortification, the Swedes resorted to tricking the Norwegians. Tord quickly began pretending to pull back, the Norwegians, believing they would be able to pursue and destroy the Swedish force, left a gap in their fortification and abandoned their positions. When Tord had lured the Norwegians far enough away from their camp, the Swedes suddenly stopped their retreat, and both the force led by Tord and the hidden force in the forest attacked.

The force at which the Swedes attacked caused the inexperienced peasant army to fall into a state of panic and were forced to pull back. As the Norwegians attempted to regain their fortified positions behind their Sled fort and Tord Bonde stopped them, a bloody skirmish quickly broke out, during which two horses were killed under him. However, just in time, the force that came from the forest reinforced him. With this unexpected reinforcement, the Norwegians dissolved and began a disorganized retreat. During the retreat, many of the Norwegians were captured, including the Norwegian commander himself, Kolbjörn Gäst, who tried to save himself by escaping to a mountain with his best men.

During the retreat, some Norwegian peasants also cried out:

Här kommer nu all Sveriges magt!

Rough translation:

Here comes all the might of Sweden!

== Aftermath ==
Tord had won a brilliant victory, however, there are several problems with the chronicle. One problem is that it claims that "Lord Kolbjörn and all his men" were captured by the Swedes, it was highly unlikely that the whole 3,000 strong Norwegian army surrendered, rather, it is most likely talking about the men that fled to the mountain with Kolbjörn. Moreover, it is also highly unlikely that the Norwegian army actually consisted of 3,000 men, as this number is most likely exaggerated.

The success of the Swedes achieved thus far were, however, interrupted by the death of Tord. He had previously placed his trust in a native Dane by the name of Jösse Boson, whom he appointed as castle steward in Karlsborg. One evening, in the middle of May, Tord and his men, who were exhausted from fighting, went to sleep, Jösse took advantage of his position as steward and locked the men inside their rooms and plundered the fortress of its weapons. He then loaded these onto a ship, and went to Tord's room. When Tord opened the door for him, Jösse split his head open with an axe.

== Works cited ==
- Styffe, Carl Gustaf (1870). Bidrag till Skandinaviens historia ur utländska arkiver: Sverige under Karl Knutsson och Kristiern af Oldenburg, 1448-1470 [Contribution to the history of Scandinavia from foreign archives: Sweden under Karl Knutsson and Kristiern af Oldenburg, 1448-1470] (in Swedish). Norstedts förlag. pp. LXXXVII–LXXXIX.
- Berg, Wilhelm (1895). Bidrag till kännendom om Göteborgs och Bohusläns fornminnen och historia [Contribution to knowledge of the antiquities and history of Gothenburg and Bohuslän] (in Swedish). Länets Fornminnesförening. pp. 435–439.
