= Lord George Stuart =

Rear-Admiral of the Blue Lord George Stuart, CB (1 March 1780 – 19 February 1841) was a Royal Navy officer who served in the French Revolutionary and Napoleonic Wars.

== Origin ==
He was from a side-branch of the Stuart family, descended from the Scottish King Robert II. He was the seventh son of John Stuart, 1st Marquess of Bute and his wife Charlotte Jane. He received the courtesy title Lord Stuart after his father became the first Marquess of Bute in 1796. Among his brothers were Charles Stuart, who died in 1796 aboard HMS Leda and Captain William Stuart RN.

== Life ==
After attending Eton College, he joined the Royal Navy in November 1793 as a midshipman. In 1795 he took part in the second voyage of HMS Providence under Captain William Robert Broughton, during which they went in search of George Vancouver to the Pacific coast of North America and later to Japan and Macau. After the wreck of HMS Providence on a coral reef at Miyako-jima, Stuart and 29 seamen finally returned to Great Britain on board an East Indiaman in 1799.

He was promoted to lieutenant in 1800 and commander in 1802. On 3 March 1804, he was appointed captain and took command of 44-gun frigate HMS Sheerness in the Indian Ocean; he was not aboard Sheerness when she sank in a heavy storm off Trincomalee on 7 January 1805. On 8 April 1806 as commander of the frigate HMS Duncan he captured the French privateer Île de France in the North Sea.

In 1807, he was appointed captain of the 32-gun frigate HMS l'Aimable, with which he captured another French privateer. In the summer of 1808 l'Aimable escorted General Wellesley's army from Cork to Portugal. On 3 February 1809, he captured the French frigate Iris after a 28-hour pursuit in the North Sea. In July 1809 he assumed command of a light squadron at the mouth of the Elbe and on 7 July, a landing party destroyed French coastal batteries nearby and occupied the city for a short time. On 29 July, the French occupied the town of Geestendorf, on the Weser 28 miles (45 km) from Cuxhaven. Learning of this Captain Stuart decided to march cross-country and attack the town. He succeeded in this and re-took it. A few days later Duke Friedrich-Wilhelm of Braunschweig-Oel and his army arrived on the opposite bank of the Weser and, because the fortress at Geestendorf had been destroyed was able to embark there and escape destruction.

In November 1810, Stuart became commander of the frigate HMS Horatio, he occupied the Dutch Zierikzee in December 1813 and expelled the French forces from the island of Schouwen.

During the War of 1812 he commanded the new 58-gun ship HMS Newcastle. In 1815 he was appointed a Companion of the Order of the Bath and later served as Naval Aide-de-camp of King William IV. In 1837, he was promoted to Rear-Admiral of the Blue.

== Family ==
He married Jane Stewart (died 1862), a daughter of Major General James Stewart, on 7 October 1800. The couple had several children, including

- Emily Frances Stuart (died 1886) who married Charles Abbott, son of Charles Abbott, 1st Baron Tenterden
- Elizabeth Jane Stuart (1803–1877) who married John Townshend, 4th Marquess Townshend
- Henry Stuart (1808–1880) who married Cecilia Hammersley, daughter of Charles Hammersley
